= Index of Ascension Island–related articles =

This page list topics related to Ascension Island.

== A ==
- Administrator of Ascension Island
- Ascension Island
- Ascension Island Council
- Ascension scrub and grasslands

== B ==
- British overseas territories

== C ==
- Cat Hill
- Communications in Saint Helena, Ascension and Tristan da Cunha
- Coat of Arms

== E ==
- Education

== F ==
- Flag

== G ==
- Georgetown
- Governor
- Green Mountain

== J ==
- João da Nova

== L ==
- List of mountains and hills of Saint Helena, Ascension and Tristan da Cunha
- List of volcanoes in Ascension Island

== O ==
- Outline of Ascension Island

== P ==
- Postage Stamps of Ascension Island

== R ==
- RAF Ascension Island

== S ==
- Saint Helena
- Scouting and Guiding on Saint Helena, Ascension and Tristan da Cunha

== T ==
- Two Boats Village
- Travellers Hill

== See also ==
- Lists of country-related topics - similar lists for other countries
