= List of towns in Saint Helena, Ascension and Tristan da Cunha =

This is a list of towns and villages in Saint Helena, Ascension and Tristan da Cunha, consisting of the island of Saint Helena, Ascension Island and the islands of Tristan da Cunha.

== Ascension Island ==
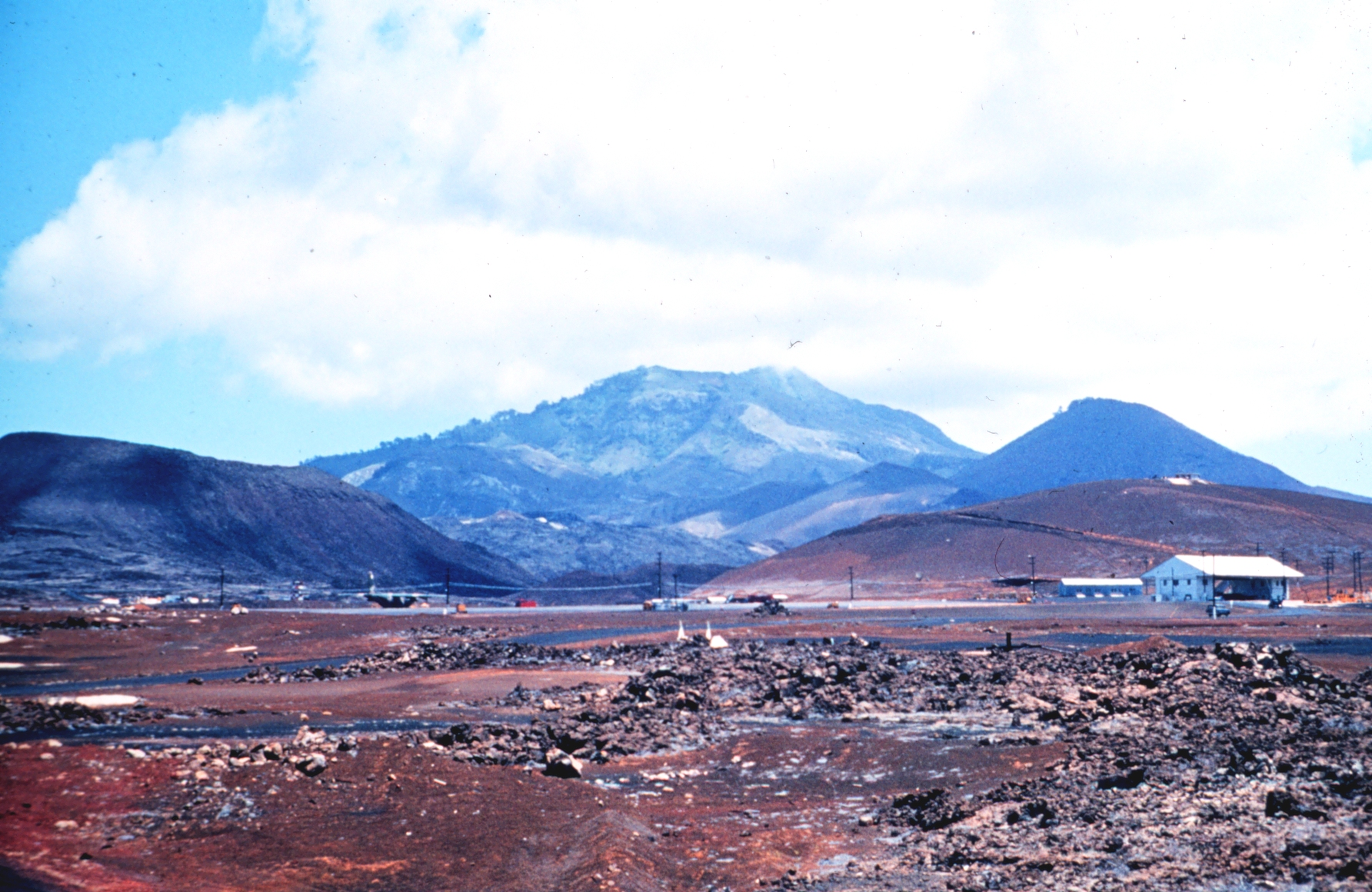
Ascension Island

Settlement	Other name(s)	Notes
Georgetown		The main civilian settlement on Ascension and its capital.
Two Boats	Two Boats Village	A civilian village, with the island's only school.
Cat Hill	Main Base	The United States' main military base on the island.
Traveller's Hill		Royal Air Force camp.
One Boat		Small village between Two Boats and Georgetown

Wideawake Airfield (RAF Ascension Island) is a fifth area of settlement, but is not a centre of population.

== Saint Helena Island ==
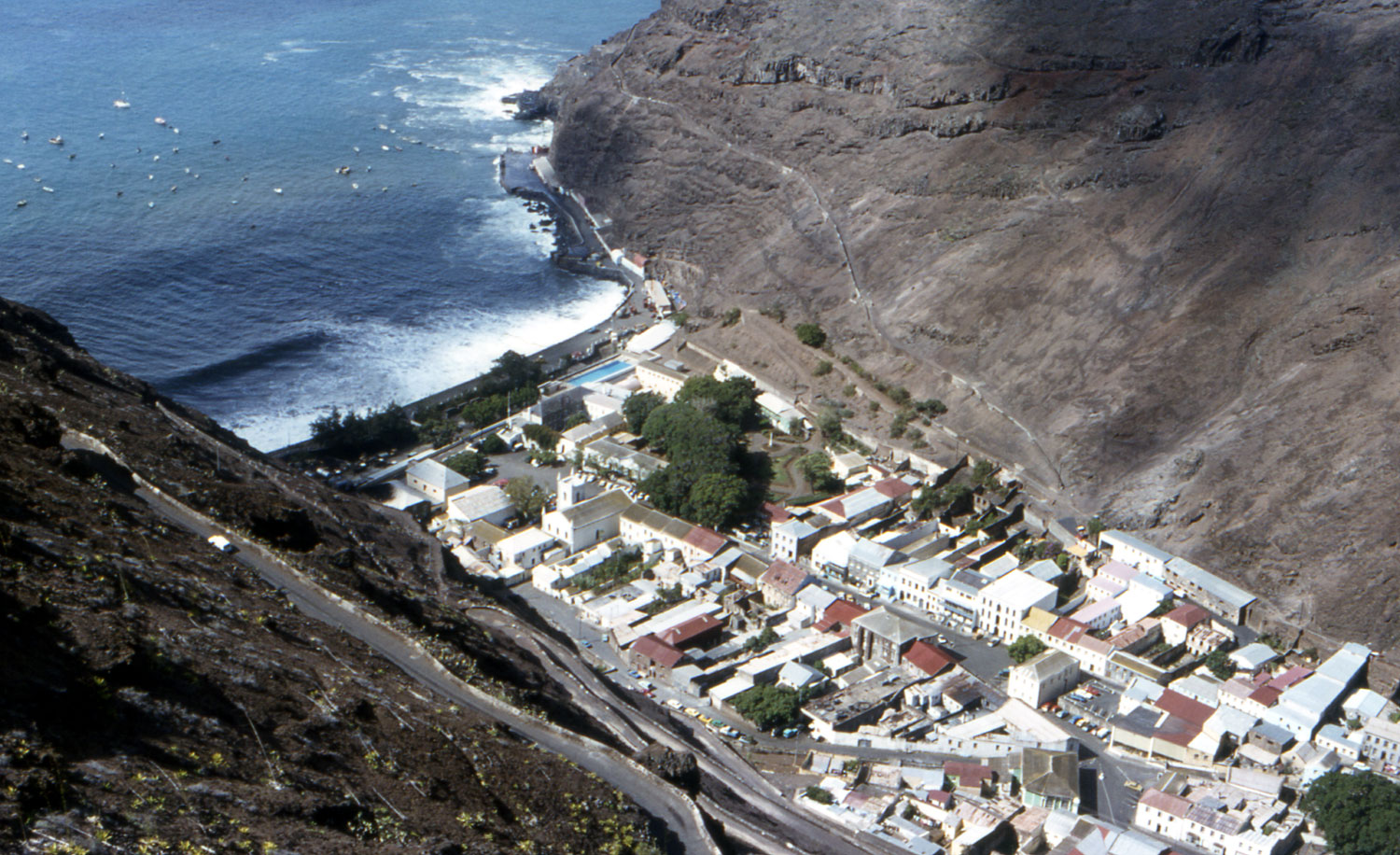
View of Jamestown

Settlement	Other Name(s)	Notes
Jamestown	City of James Town	Jamestown is the capital of Saint Helena and the territory of Saint Helena, Ascension and Tristan da Cunha. It is also formally a city.
Ruperts		A port village in Jamestown district composed of Rupert's Valley and Rupert's Wharf.
Haytown		Small settlement located in Jamestown district, in Rupert's Valley.
Half Tree Hollow		Half Tree Hollow is now the most populous settlement in Saint Helena; began as a suburb of Jamestown.
Ladder Hill		An older settlement in Half Tree Hollow district, at the top of Jacob's ladder.
Saint Paul's		Location of the governor's residence and the Anglican cathedral.
Briars Village		Part of the Alarm Forest district; effectively a suburb of Jamestown.
Barren Ground		Part of the Blue Hill district.
Broadbottom	Broad Bottom	Part of the Blue Hill district.
Blue Hill	Blue Hill Village	
Levelwood		
Longwood		
Hutt's Gate		In Longwood district.
Bamboo Hedge		Main settlement of Sandy Bay district.
New Ground		In St Paul's district.
Thompson's Hill		In St Paul's district.

== Tristan da Cunha ==
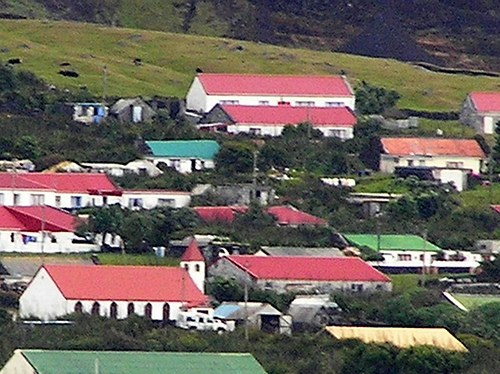
Edinburgh of the Seven Seas

Settlement	Other Name(s)	Notes
Edinburgh of the Seven Seas	Edinburgh, Settlement of Edinburgh, The Settlement	Edinburgh of the Seven Seas is the capital of Tristan da Cunha, and is the only settlement in the archipelago†
Potato Patches	Patches Plain, The Patches	Agricultural area, uninhabited

†although a staffed meteorological station exists on Gough Island.

== See also ==
- Geography of Saint Helena
- Geography of Tristan da Cunha
