= Georgetown, Ascension Island =

Capital of Ascension Island, United Kingdom

Georgetown
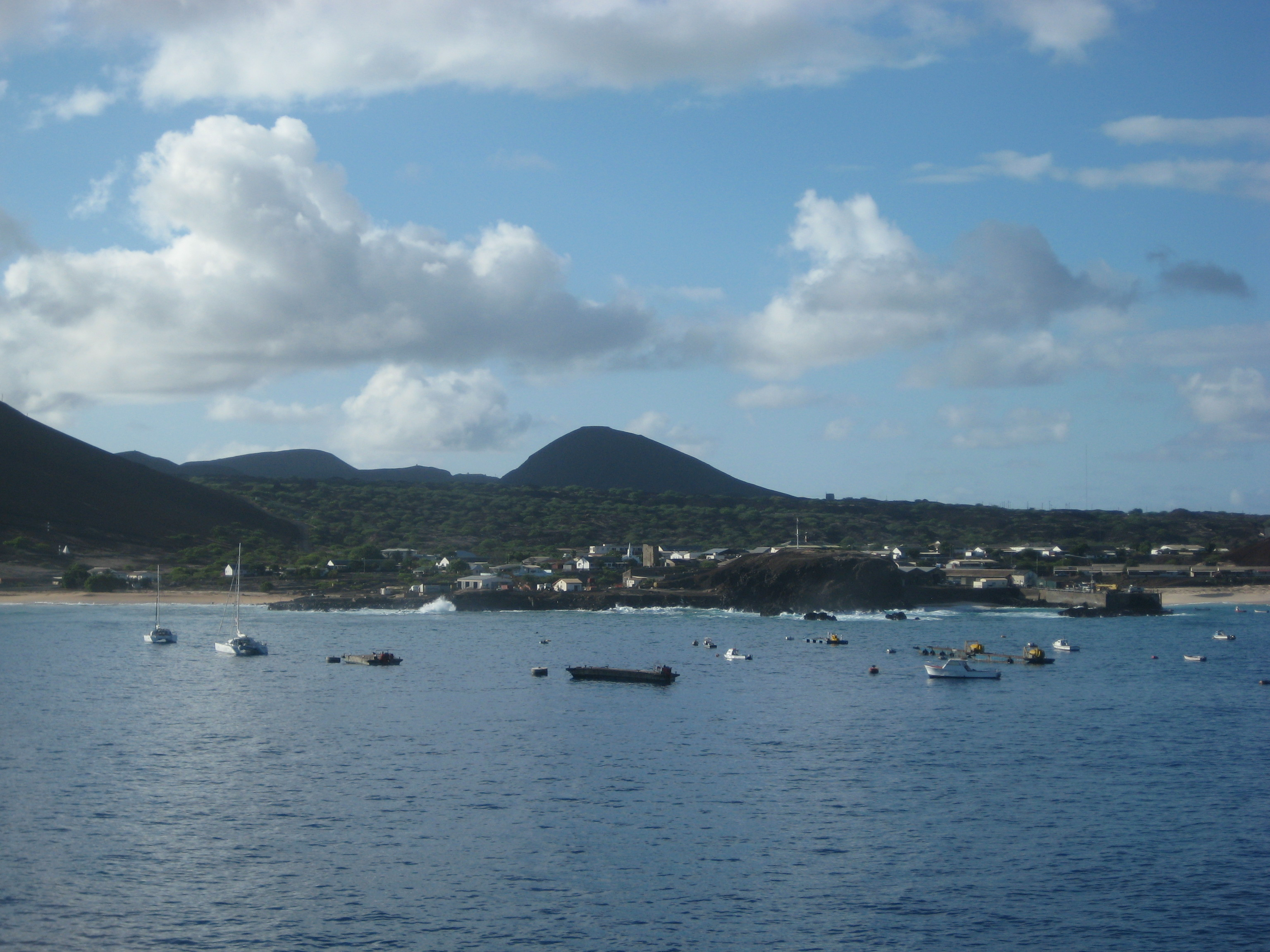
- Georgetown in 2011
- Interactive map of Georgetown
- Coordinates: 7°55′34″S 14°24′40″W
- Sovereign state: United Kingdom
- British overseas territory: Saint Helena, Ascension and Tristan da Cunha
- Island: Ascension
- First inhabited: in 1815
- Founder: Royal Navy
- Named for: King George III
- Capital of: Ascension Island

Population (2008)
  - Total: 450 (est.)
- Time zone: UTC+0 (GMT)
- Climate: BWh

Georgetown is the capital and chief settlement of Ascension Island, in the British Overseas Territory of Saint Helena, Ascension and Tristan da Cunha, situated on the west coast of the island.

The town is centred on St Mary's Church, part of the Anglican Diocese of St Helena and the former Exiles Club, built as a Royal Marines barracks at the time of Napoleon's exile to Saint Helena in the early 19th century.

It is named after King George III, who reigned at the time the island was claimed for Britain and garrisoned by the Admiralty in 1815.

In addition to the church, there is a pier, an athletics track, a small supermarket, Royal Mail post office, snack bar, hotel, police station, hospital, dental surgery, and a library. There is no school, however, and pupils travel to Two Boats village, 3 miles inland, in the centre of the island.

== Naval history ==
A naval base was established at Georgetown in 1816 due to British concerns that the French might make use of the island to attempt a rescue of their exiled former Emperor.

Following Napoleon's death in 1821 (and George III's the year before), the settlement found a new role as a supply, maintenance and victualling base for the West Africa Squadron. Local tufa was used for building, but everything else had to be imported (including seeds, vegetables and fruit trees, all of which were cultivated on Green Mountain to supplement the locally available diet of turtle meat).

By 1829, a small jetty had been constructed, as well as several buildings on what is now the Regent Square area, close to the sea (including a hospital – the West Africa Squadron was notoriously prone to sickness).

In June 1829, a Lieutenant of the Royal Engineers, Henry Brandreth, arrived on Ascension with a remit to survey the facilities there and make recommendations for their improvement. He condemned what he found as, for the most part, 'miserable tenements ... inhabited by vermin'. Together, with the local commandant, he recommended re-establishing the settlement a little way back from the sea, on the elevated plateau which Georgetown occupies today. Having returned to England to oversee the supply and manufacture of certain items for the island, he returned in 1830 to begin work on this project. A key innovation was the construction of St George's Water Tank, which can still be seen today: water was channelled to it from the mountain top, as well as from every roof in Georgetown, and from here it was fed by a windpump into a header tank for distribution to local buildings (and, via a pipeline, to the pierhead for transfer to ships). The Marine Barracks building also dates from this period, as do several other buildings including Georgetown's hospital, which continues to fulfil the purpose for which it was built.

The site of the old settlement, closer to the sea, was then used for storage and maintenance (the surviving Main Storehouse of 1848 was once claimed to be the largest building in the southern hemisphere). Before long, to meet the demands of an increasingly steam-powered navy, coaling facilities were built, and in 1862 a 'steam factory' housing metalworkers, a machine shop and smelting works, was established.

Georgetown continued to serve as a strategic base for the Navy through the 20th century, though after 1899 the site was increasingly administered by the Eastern Telegraph Company. When in 1922 the Board of the Admiralty ceded Ascension Island to the Colonial Office, an exchange of correspondence indicates that one thing its officials wished to preserve was their annual gift of turtle soup from Georgetown (an annual perquisite apparently enjoyed since 1816).

=== Forts ===
On 22 October 1815, HMS Peruvian and HMS Zenobia anchored in the roadstead off Georgetown to claim the island for the British Crown. Once ashore, one of the first tasks undertaken by the sailors was to set up a pair of cannons on the promontory in the harbour to provide some defence. This battery became known as Fort Cockburn (renamed in the middle of the century Fort Thornton).

A second fort was established on a site called Goat Hill further to the west in around 1860 (Fort Hayes) and a third, Fort Bedford, on the hill overlooking the town called Cross Hill. Fort Bedford, which dates from 1903, still has some Victorian cannons, as well as a pair of BL 5.5 inch Mark I naval guns that were originally fitted to HMS Hood. These guns were used to repel a German attack by U-124 on 9 December 1941 during World War II with surprisingly great success as the Germans did not approach the island again. Fort Hayes until recently housed the museum of the Ascension Island Heritage Society.

== Present-day Georgetown ==
The town is a centre of culture on Ascension. It usually hosts local athletics events as well as being the start of the annual dew pond race from sea level to the highest point on the island on Green Mountain. Ascension Day activities (to celebrate the discovery of Ascension) are either hosted here or in nearby Two Boats village. As of 2008 the population was about 450. Nearby Long Beach is an important nesting ground for the giant green turtle.

== Georgetown Cemetery ==
A cemetery was begun some time in the early 19th century. It was used both for deaths on the island and for burial of persons dying on ships within one day's sail of the island. Graves of note include Captain William Bafe and his crew, and Commodore Reginald Thomas John Levinge of the Levinge baronets.

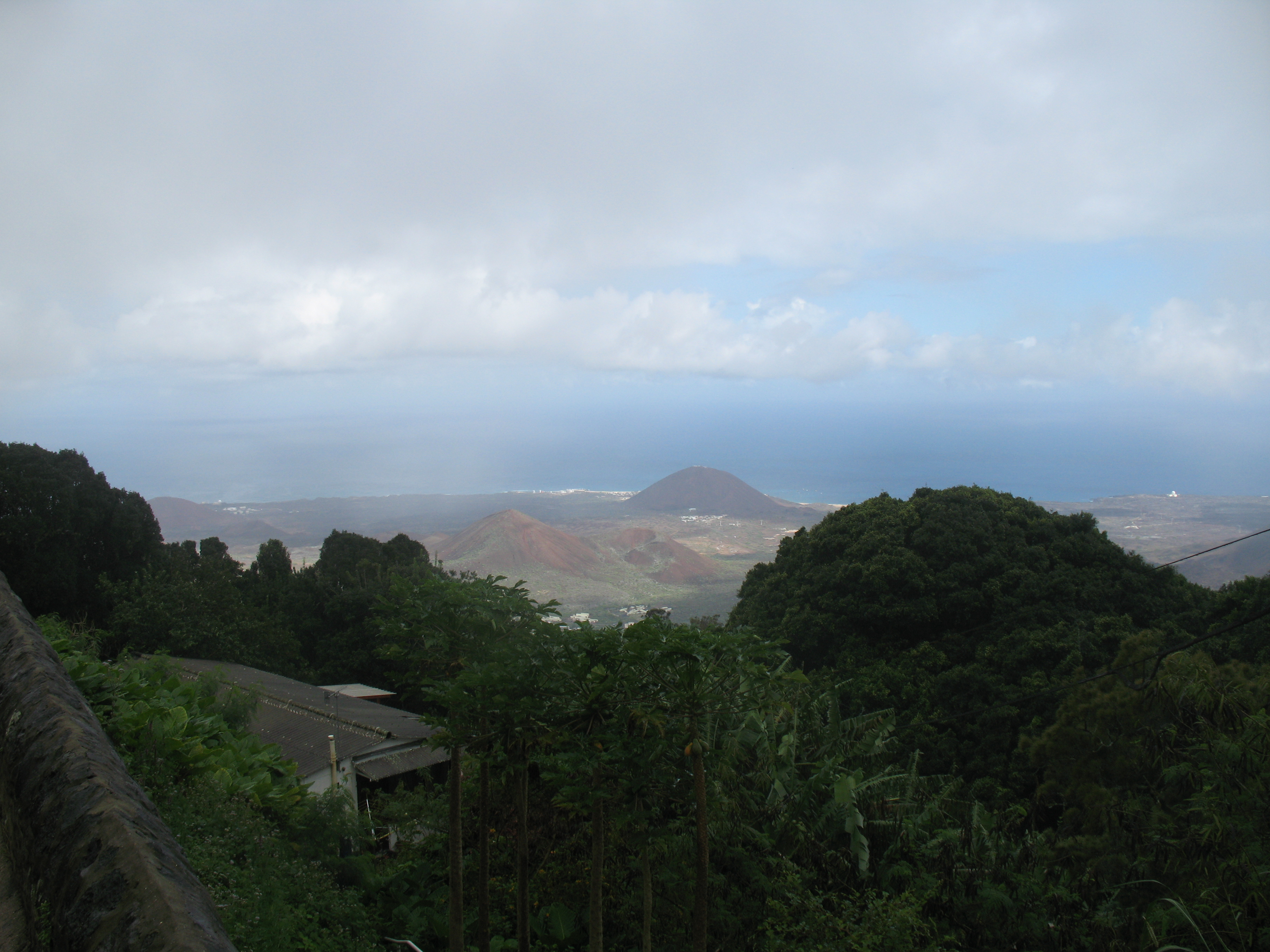
Georgetown in the distance, from atop Green Mountain.

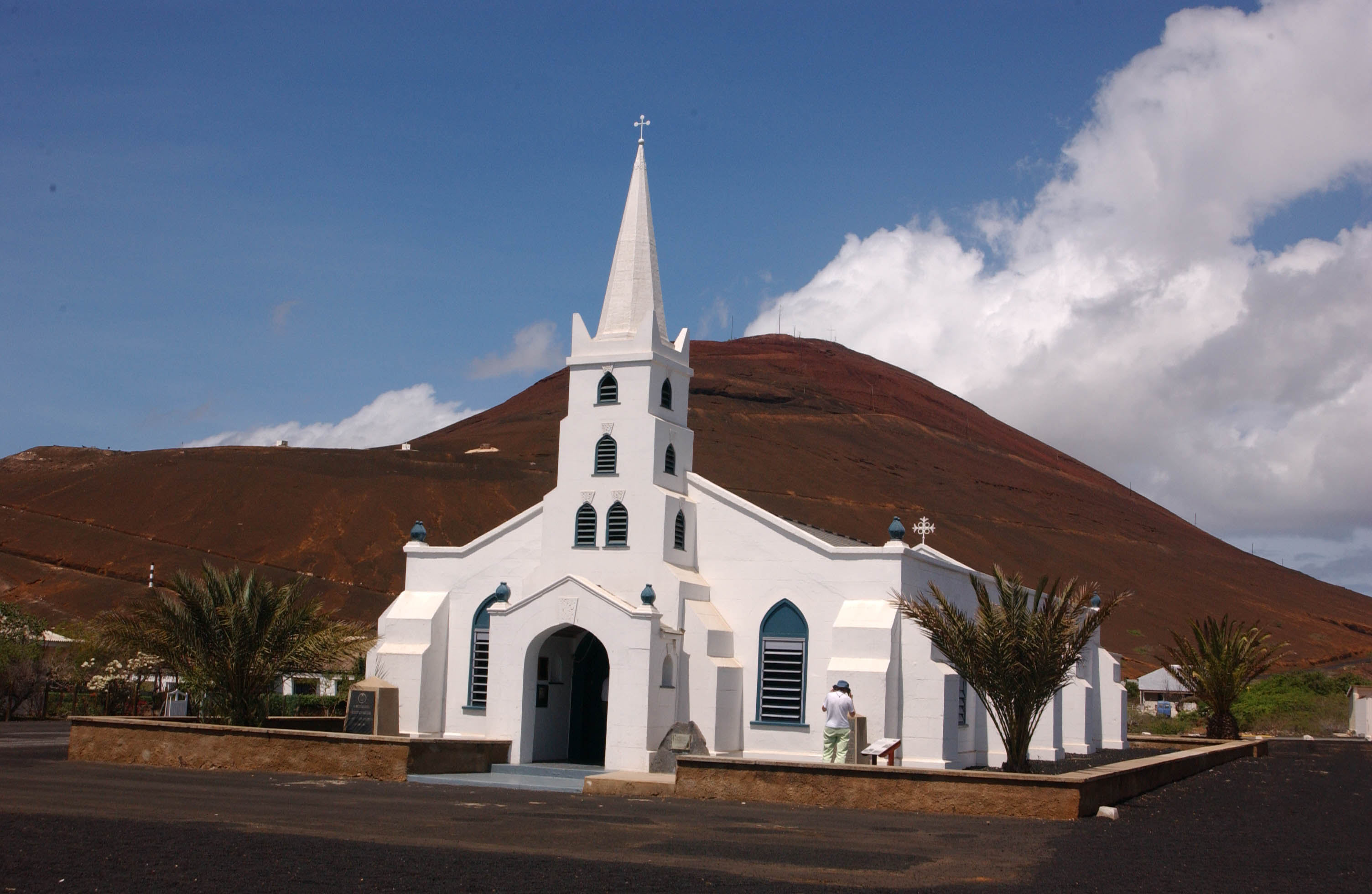
St Mary's Church.

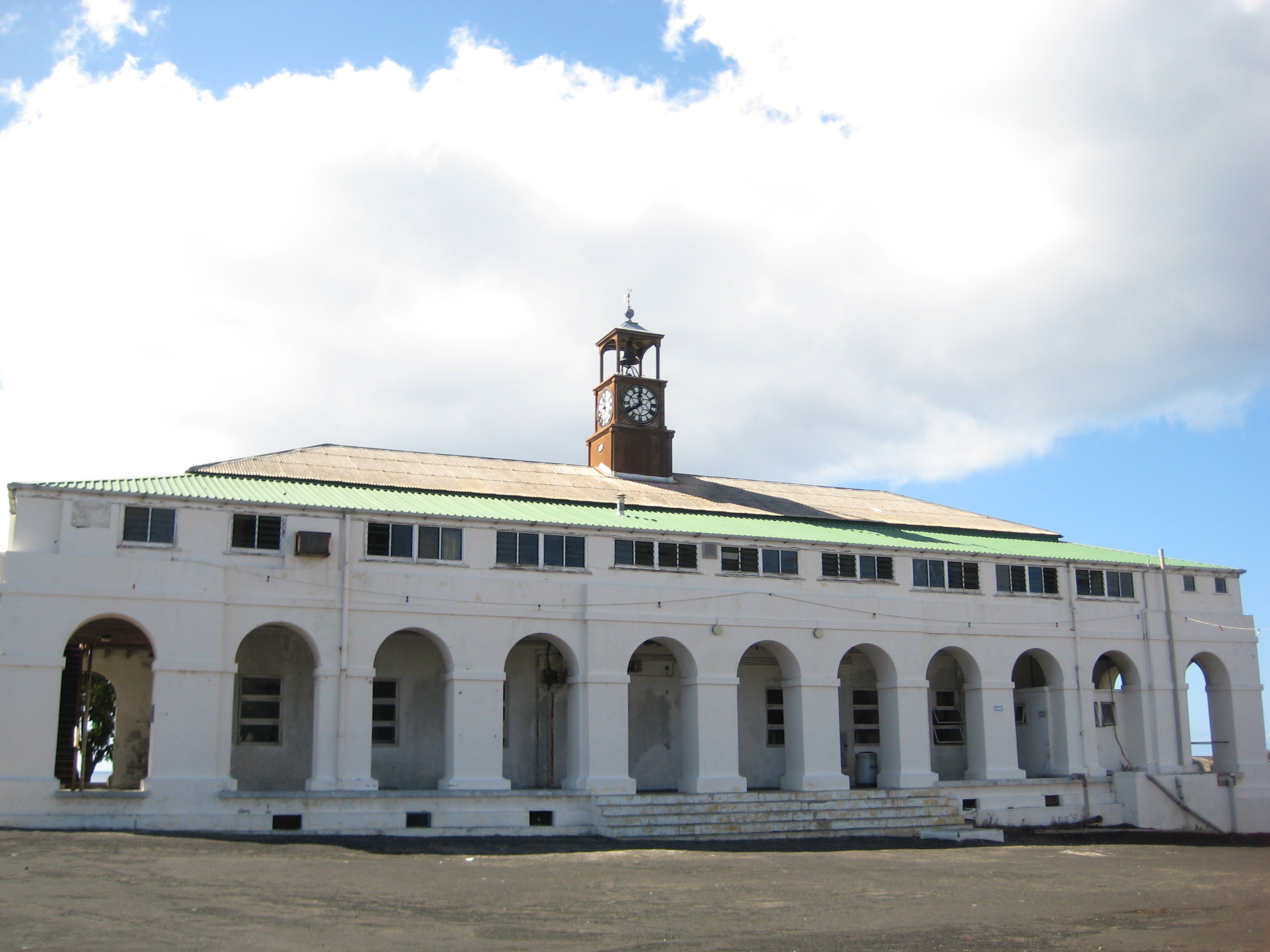
The Old Barracks, Georgetown.

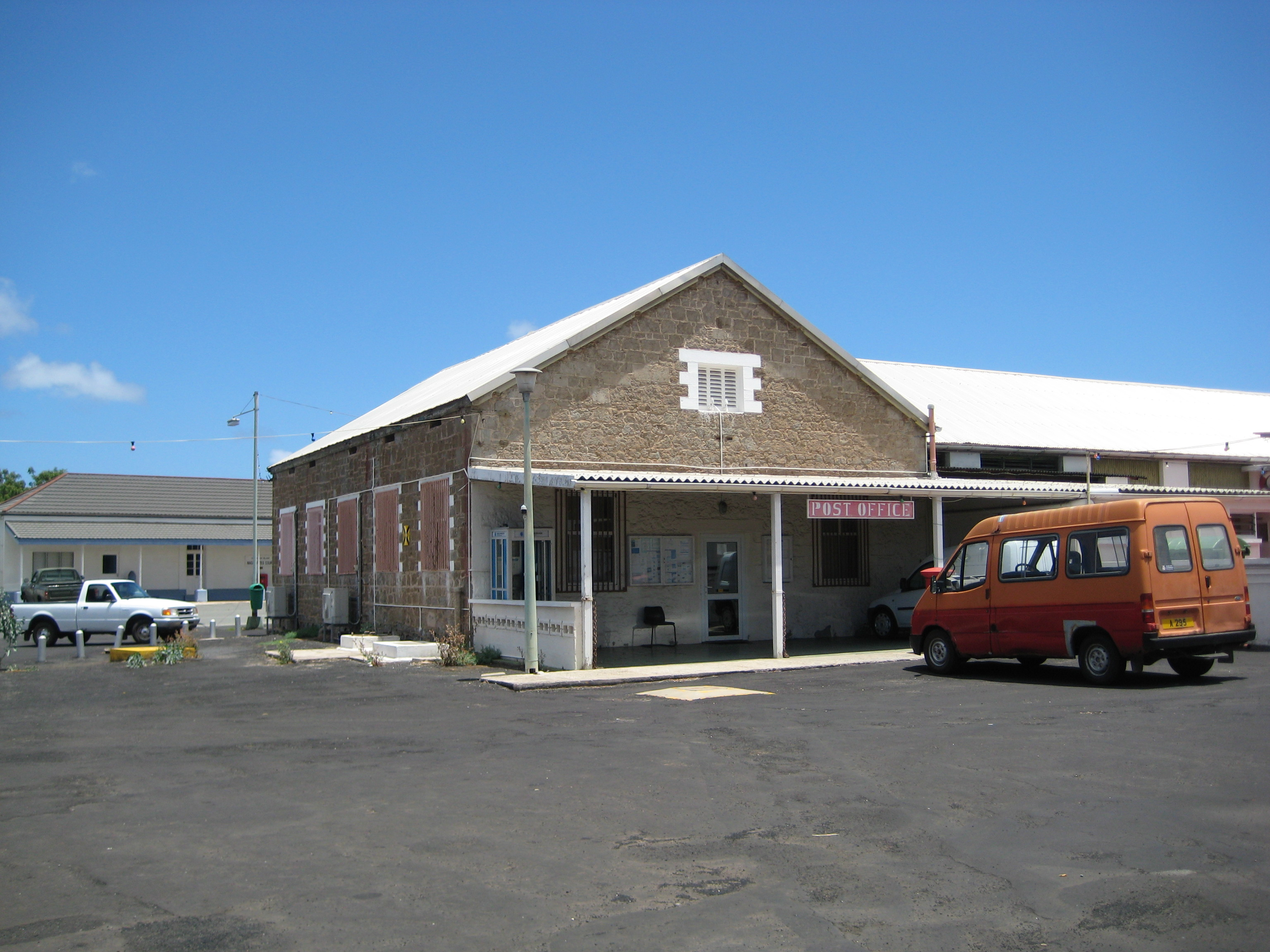
The island's post office in Georgetown.

== See also ==
- List of towns in Saint Helena, Ascension and Tristan da Cunha
