= Troglotroctes ashmoleorum =

Scientific classification
- Kingdom: Animalia
- Phylum: Arthropoda
- Clade: Pancrustacea
- Class: Insecta
- Order: Psocodea
- Family: Liposcelididae
- Genus: Troglotroctes
- Species: T. ashmolearum

Binomial name
- Troglotroctes ashmolearum Lienhard, 1996

Species of booklouse

Troglotroctes ashmolearum is a wingless insect of the order Psocoptera, in the Liposcelididae family, found only on Ascension Island.
