= HMS Zenobia (1807) =

British naval brig-sloop (1807–1835)

- Zenobia

History

United Kingdom
- Name: HMS Zenobia
- Owner: Royal Navy
- Builder: Brindley, King's Lynn
- Launched: 7 October 1807
- Out of service: 6 August 1835
- Fate: Broken up

General characteristics
- Class & type: 18-gun Cruizer-class brig-sloop
- Tons burthen: 38479/94 (bm)
- Length: 100 ft 1 1/2 in (30.5 m) (overall); 77 ft 4 in (23.6 m) (keel)
- Beam: 30 ft 7 in (9.3 m)
- Depth of hold: 12 ft 9 in (3.9 m)
- Complement: 121
- Armament: 2 × 6-pounder bow guns; 16 × 32-pounder carronades

HMS Zenobia was an 18-gun Cruizer class brig-sloop launched 7 October 1807 by Brindley at King's Lynn. Although she served during the Napoleonic Wars she is known for her role in two events, the claiming of Ascension Island for Great Britain in 1815, and the naming of the Saumarez Reefs in 1823. She was broken up in 1835.

== Napoleonic Wars and War of 1812 ==
Commander Alexander K. Mackenzie commissioned her and remained her captain until July 1812. During that time she was in the North Sea and visited Portugal at least twice.

Zenobia was one of the Royal Navy vessels involved in the ill-fated Walcheren Campaign, which started on 30 July 1809. In August she was part of the light squadron under Sir Edward Owen and participated in the bombardment of Flushing. British forces withdrew in December. On 26 November Zenobia captured the Danish Ship Twee Gebroeders.

In early January 1810, Zenobia sent Emanuel, Findrup, master, of Christiana, into Yarmouth. Zenobia also ran down Drie Grebroders, Oomackes, master, off Yarmouth. She had been coming from Riga and was totally lost.

On 18 September 1810, she joined Venerable in the chase and capture of Alexander, a French ketch privateer of 16 guns (but only four mounted). Alexander was on her first cruise out of Saint-Malo and had captured the schooner Peggy. On 24 October Zenobia sailed for Portugal.

Zenobia sailed for Portugal on 24 January 1812, and in July Commander Richard Foley assumed command. The next month Zenobia captured the American ships Cordelia, Salter, master (14 August), Catherine, Allen, master, (17 August) and America, Hilbert, master (24 August). Cordelia, of St. Ubes, arrived in Lisbon on 19 August. Catherine, of St Michaels, arrived there on 23 August. America had been sailing from Baltimore to Lisbon and arrived at Plymouth on 8 September. Cordelia reached Plymouth on 19 September. Catherine arrived at Plymouth on 2 October. The London Gazette report of a grant of two-thirds of the value of the detained vessels states that the detainment took place prior to hostilities.

In December, Zenobia detained and sent into Gibraltar George and Albert, Dashiel, master. George and Albert had been sailing from Baltimore to Gibraltar.

In late January or early February 1813, Zenobia captured Little James, which was sailing from Lisbon to America. However, the American privateer Paul Jones, of 16 guns and 120 men, recaptured Little James. She was only one of a number of vessels that Paul Jones captured at around this time. However, the gun-brig Rebuff recaptured James (a.k.a. Little James), May, master, and sent her into Gibraltar in February.

On 25 June 1813, Zenobia captured the American ship Hindostan. The initial payment of prize money amounted to £5000. On 27 June, Zenobia captured Isabella. Isabella, Shepheard, master, had been sailing from New Orleans to Cadiz. (Note: A first-class share of the final distribution of prize money for Hindostan and Isabella was worth £62 18s 11 1/2d; a sixth-class share, that of an ordinary seaman, was worth £1 5s 10 3/4d.)

At about the same time Zenobia detained Hepsa, Bailey, master, which had been sailing from New York to Lisbon, and Isabella, Shepheard, master, which had been sailing from New Orleans to Cadiz.

On 3 January 1814, Zenobia captured Wellington. (Note: A first-class share of the prize money for Wellington was worth £7 1s 14d; a sixth-class share was worth 3s 2 1/2d.)

On 7 June, Foley received promotion to post-captain, and Commander Nicholas Charles Dobree assumed command.

Under Dobree, Zenobia recaptured William & Alfred on 5 January 1815 and Diana on 3 March. The American privateer Harpy had captured William & Alfred off Cape Finisterre three days before as she was sailing from London to Antigua. Zenobia sent her into Lisbon on 10 January, minus part of the cargo, which Harpy had taken. The privateer James Munro had captured Diana, of Greenock, Ferguson, master. Diana had been sailing from Alicante to Londonderry when James Munro captured her. After Zenobia had recaptured Diana, Zenobia took Diana into Lisbon.

== Ascension Island ==
Zenobia, under Commander Nicholas Charles Dobree, together with her sister ship Peruvian, under Captain James Kearney White, had been part of the flotilla under Rear Admiral George Cockburn that had taken Napoleon into his final exile at St Helena. Cockburn was concerned that the French might use Ascension Island, uninhabited at the time, to stage a rescue mission. He therefore decided to claim and garrison the island. On 22 October 1815, at 5pm, Zenobia and Peruvian anchored in Clarence Bay. The ships' logs record that at 5.30pm, Dobree and White came ashore, raised the Jack, and took possession of the island in the name of His Britannic Majesty, King George III. Zenobia left shortly thereafter, while Peruvian stayed until Spring. On 8 April 1816, Zenobia arrived in Plymouth and was laid up.

Napoleon died on St Helena in 1821 and the Admiralty wanted to withdraw the garrison. However, Sir George Collier, Commodore of the West Africa Squadron, persuaded the Admiralty to retain it as it had become a victualing station for the vessels of the squadron, which was engaged in anti-slavery patrols. It also provided a sanatorium for the squadron's ships and crew. The Admiralty later designated Ascension Island "HMS Ascension", a "Stone sloop of War of the smaller class".

== Fate ==
On 6 August 1835, the Navy Office offered Zenobia for sale by Dutch auction for £1600 but had to take her in at £890. Later that month, a Mr. Tibbett bought her for £650 for breaking up.
