= HMS Peruvian (1808) =

Brig-sloop of the Royal Navy

- Peruvian

History

United Kingdom
- Name: HMS Peruvian
- Builder: Parson's Yard, Warsash
- Launched: 1808
- Commissioned: May 1808
- Decommissioned: July 1816
- Fate: Broken up, February 1830

General characteristics
- Class & type: Cruizer-class brig-sloop
- Tons burthen: 384 bm
- Length: 100 ft 6 in (30.63 m) o/a
- Beam: 30 ft 6 in (9.30 m)
- Sail plan: Brig
- Complement: 121
- Armament: 16 × 32-pounder carronades; 2 × 6-pounder bow guns

HMS Peruvian was an 18-gun Cruizer-class brig-sloop launched in 1808, at Parson's Yard, Warsash, England. She was the first naval vessel built at that yard. Peruvian captured two American privateers and participated in an expedition up the Penobscot River during the War of 1812. Then she claimed Ascension Island for Great Britain in 1815. She was broken up in 1830.

== Napoleonic Wars ==
Commander Francis Douglas commissioned her in May 1808, for the Downs. Douglas had been first lieutenant of HMS Repulse (1780) at the mutiny at The Nore in 1797.

On 19 February 1809, Peruvian was in company with the sloop Osprey when Osprey captured the Vrouw Gesina. In May, Peruvian captured Commerce, Rook, master, and sent her into The Downs.

Then on 14 January 1810, Peruvian sailed for the Leeward Islands. Three days later Peruvian was in sight, and so entitled to share, together with a number of other vessels, in the prize money arising from the recapture of the Toms by Hyperion. In November 1810 Commander Francis Dickinson took command, but he died on 23 April 1812.

== War of 1812 ==
In 1812, Peruvian was under Lieutenant Amos F. Westropp, in the West Indies. He was promoted to Commander in August. On 12 October 1812, Peruvian captured the sloop Prevoyante. Twelve days later, Peruvian captured the American privateer schooner Yankee off Sombrero, Anguilla. Yankee had 7 guns and a crew of 44 men. She was 38 days out of Salem, but had made no captures. Peruvian sent Yankee into Antigua. American records state that the privateer was Yankee American, 77 tons burthen, T. Pillsbury, master.

In 1813, under Commander George Kippen, Peruvian was on the American Station. On 6 February, she was returning to her station from St. Thomas, when around seventy-nine miles (127 km) east by north of Sombrero, she encountered an American privateer. During the last two hours of the 15-hour chase, the privateer used her stern guns to fire continuously at Peruvian. Eventually Peruvian got within pistol shot and fired her bow guns, with her marines also firing. The privateer surrendered. She turned out to be John, of 16 guns and a crew of 100 men. John, of Salem, was under the command of Captain James M. Fairfield and was on her second cruise. At the time of the capture Peruvian was apparently in company with Cumberland. The report in Lloyd's List describes John as having 20 guns and 93 men and surrendering after a chase of 13 hours. Peruvian sent John into St Thomas, where she arrived on 10 February 1813. The head money bill specified that 90 men had been captured.

On 6 May, William, of Wilmington, Holman, master, arrived at Antigua as a prize to Peruvian. On 8 November, Peruvian was at St Thomas with Marlborough, Venus, and Espiegle to gather a convoy of some 40 merchant to convoy back to Britain.

In August 1814, Peruvian took part in an expedition up the Penobscot River in Maine. She joined Sylph, Dragon, Endymion, Bacchante, as well as some transports. Bulwark, Tenedos, Rifleman, and Pictou also joined. On the evening of 31 August, Sylph, Peruvian, and the transport Harmony, accompanied by a boat from Dragon, embarked marines, foot soldiers, and a detachment from the Royal Artillery, to move up the Penobscot under the command of Captain Robert Barrie of Dragon. The objective was the American frigate Adams, of twenty-six 18 pounders, that had taken refuge some 27 miles up stream at Hampden, Maine. Here Adams had landed her guns and fortified a position on the bank with fifteen 18-pounders commanding the river. Moving up the river took two days, but eventually, after the Battle of Hampden, the British were able to capture the American defenders at Bangor, though not until after the Americans had burnt Adams. The British also captured 11 other ships and destroyed six. The British lost only one man killed, a sailor from Dragon, and had several soldiers wounded.

In October 1814, Commander James Kearney White took over command. On 22 December, Peruvian detained the Spanish vessel Dolores, which was condemned as a "droit of Admiralty".

Around 21 January 1815, Peruvian sent into Bermuda Rufus, King, master, which had been sailing from Charleston to Bordeaux. On 8 April, Peruvian left Bermuda for home.

== The news of Waterloo ==
By mid-June, Peruvian was at Ostend. From there she carried Major the Hon. Henry Percy of the 14th Light Dragoons, the only aide to the Duke of Wellington to have survived Waterloo unscathed, into the middle of the Channel, where she was becalmed. White lowered Peruvian's gig, chose four stalwart men from his crew, took an oar himself and handed one to Percy, who had learned how to row at Eton, and with two captured French Eagles lying in the stern, rowed for the Kent coast. Around 3 p.m. on 21 June, they arrived near Broadstairs, where Percy and White immediately took a post-chaise-and-four to deliver the news to London.

== Ascension Island ==
Peruvian, still under Captain White, together with her sister ship Zenobia, under Captain Nicholas Charles Dobree, had been part of the flotilla under Rear Admiral George Cockburn that had taken Napoleon into his final exile at St Helena. (On the way Peruvian had had to make a detour to Guernsey to pick up a supply of French wine for Napoleon.)

Cockburn was concerned that the French might use Ascension Island, uninhabited at the time, to stage a rescue mission. He therefore decided to claim and garrison the island. On 22 October 1815, at 5pm, Peruvian and Zenobia anchored in Clarence Bay. The ships' logs record that at 5.30pm, White and Dobree came ashore, raised the Jack, and took possession of the island in the name of His Britannic Majesty, King George III. Zenobia left shortly thereafter but Peruvian stayed until spring.

Napoleon died on St Helena in 1821, and the Admiralty wanted to withdraw the garrison. However, Sir George Collier, Commodore of the West Africa Squadron, persuaded the Admiralty to retain it as it had become a victualling station for the vessels of the squadron, which was engaged in anti-slavery patrols. It also provided a sanatorium for the squadron's ships and crew.

Ascension Island was later designated "HMS Ascension", a "Stone sloop of War of the smaller class".

== Fate ==
By July 1816, Peruvian was laid up in ordinary at Plymouth where she stayed until 1830. She was broken up on 25 February 1830.
