= Ascension Island =

Island in the South Atlantic Ocean

- Constituent part of Saint Helena, Ascension and Tristan da Cunha
- Flag Coat of arms
- Anthem: "God Save the King" (Note: "God Save the King" is the national anthem by custom, not statute, and there is no authorised version. Typically only the first verse is usually sung, although the second verse is also often sung as well at state and public events. The words King, he, him, his, used at present, are replaced by Queen, she, her when the monarch is female.)
- Topographic map of Ascension Island

- Location of Ascension Island in the southern Atlantic Ocean
- Sovereignty: United Kingdom
- Overseas territory: Saint Helena, Ascension and Tristan da Cunha
- British settlement: 1815; 211 years ago
- Dependency of Saint Helena: 12 September 1922; 104 years ago
- Current constitution: 1 September 2009; 17 years ago
- Capital and largest settlement: Georgetown; 7°56′S 14°25′W
- Official languages: English
- Government: Self-governing dependency under a constitutional monarchy
  - Monarch: Charles III
  - Governor: Nigel Phillips
  - Administrator: Rowan Laxton
- Legislature: Island Council

National representation
  - Minister: Stewart Wood

Area
  - Total: 88 km^{2} (34 sq mi)
- Highest elevation: 859 m (2,818 ft)

Population
  - 2016 census: 806
  - Density: 9.15/km^{2} (23.7/sq mi)
- Currency: Saint Helena pound (£) (SHP)
- Time zone: UTC±00:00 (GMT)
- Date format: dd/mm/yyyy
- Driving side: Left
- Calling code: +247
- UK postcode: ASCN 1ZZ
- ISO 3166 code: SH-AC
- Internet TLD: .ac

Ascension Island is an isolated volcanic island, near 8° south of the Equator in the South Atlantic Ocean. It is about 960 miles (1,540 km) from the coast of Africa and 1,400 miles (2,300 km) from the coast of South America. It is governed as part of the British Overseas Territory of Saint Helena, Ascension and Tristan da Cunha, of which the main island, Saint Helena, is around 800 miles (1,300 km) to the southeast. The territory also includes the sparsely populated Tristan da Cunha archipelago, 2,000 miles (3,200 km) to the south, about halfway to the Antarctic Circle.

Ascension Island was discovered by the Portuguese seafarer João da Nova in 1501, before being named Ascension by Afonso de Albuquerque in 1503 on Ascension Day. Ascension Island was garrisoned by the British Admiralty from 22 October 1815 to 1922 and was an important refuelling stop for ships and commercial airliners in the days of international air travel by flying boats. During World War II, it was an important naval and air station, especially providing antisubmarine warfare bases in the Battle of the Atlantic.

The island is the location of RAF Ascension Island, which is a Royal Air Force station, a European Space Agency rocket tracking station, a British-American signals intelligence facility and the BBC World Service Atlantic Relay Station. The island was used extensively as a staging point by the British military during the Falklands War. Ascension Island hosts one of four ground antennas that assist in the operation of the Global Positioning System (GPS) navigational system (the others are on Kwajalein Island, Diego Garcia, and Cape Canaveral). NASA operates a Meter Class Autonomous Telescope (MCAT) on Ascension Island for tracking orbital debris, which is potentially hazardous to operating spacecraft and astronauts, at a facility called the John Africano NASA/AFRL Orbital Debris Observatory.

== History ==
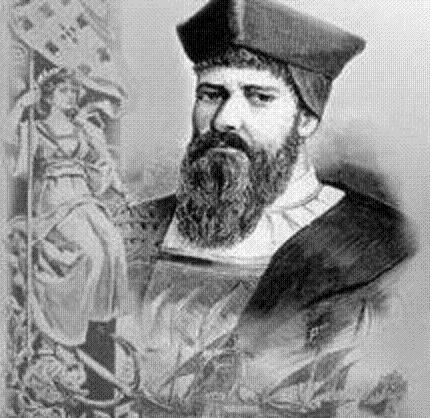
João da Nova discovered the island on Ascension Day 1501.

=== Discovery ===
Two Portuguese chronicles suggest that João da Nova leading the third armada to India discovered Ascension in 1501. Da Nova is variously said to have sailed from Lisbon on 1 March, 5 March, 11 March, 26–27 March or 10 April. João de Barros wrote that passing eight degrees beyond the equator, towards the south, an island was found to which the name Concepcão was given whilst Damião de Góis' later chronicle described the sighting of an island south of the line which was named Conçeicam. Several references suggest the island was rediscovered and named Ascension by Afonso de Albuquerque in 1503 on Ascension Day.

Dry and barren, the island had little appeal for passing ships except for collecting fresh meat, and was not claimed for the Portuguese Crown. Mariners could hunt for the numerous seabirds and the enormous female green turtles that laid their eggs on the sandy beaches. The Portuguese also introduced goats as a potential source of meat for future mariners.

In February 1701, HMS Roebuck, commanded by William Dampier, sank in the common anchoring spot in Clarence Bay to the northwest of the island. Sixty men survived for two months until they were rescued. Almost certainly, after a few days they found the strong water spring in the high interior of the island, in what is now called Breakneck Valley (there is a much smaller water source, lower on the mountain, which was named Dampier's Drip by people who probably misinterpreted Dampier's story).

It is possible, but disputed, that the island was sometimes used as an open prison for criminal mariners, although there is only one documented case of such an exile, a Dutch ship's officer, Leendert Hasenbosch, set ashore at Clarence Bay as a punishment for sodomy in May 1725. British mariners found the Dutchman's tent, belongings and diary in January 1726; the man's remains were not found. His diary was published in translation in London later that same year, under the title Sodomy Punish'd.

=== Organised settlement ===
Organised settlement of Ascension Island began in 1815, when the British garrisoned it as a precaution after imprisoning Napoleon on Saint Helena to the southeast. On 22 October, the Cruizer-class brig-sloops Zenobia and Peruvian claimed the island for King George III. The Royal Navy designated the island as a stone frigate, HMS Ascension, with the classification of "Sloop of War of the smaller class".

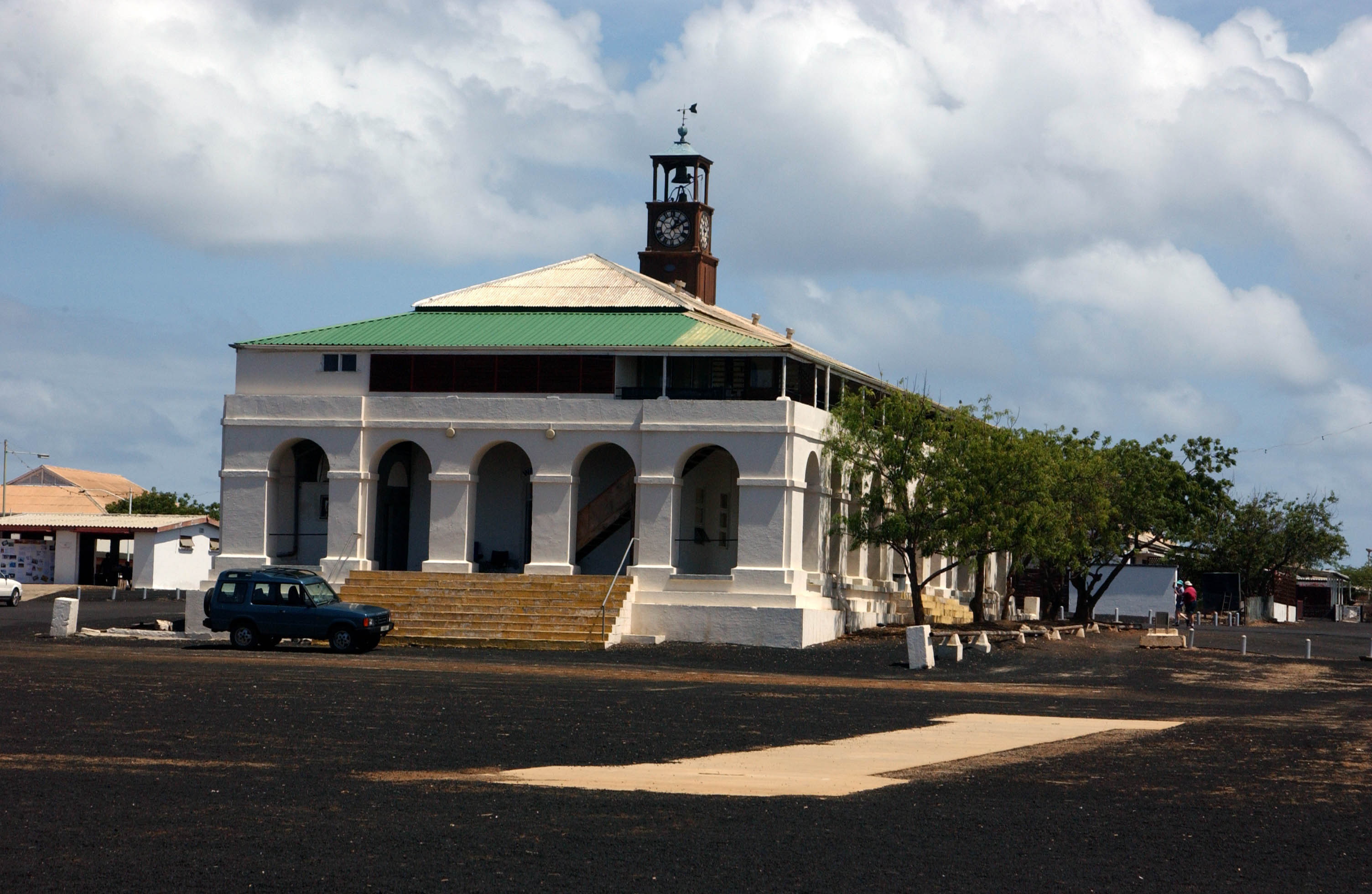
Royal Marine barracks (1830) in the former Royal Dockyard, Georgetown

The location of the island made it a useful stopping-point for ships and communications. The Royal Navy used the island as a victualling station for ships, particularly those of the West Africa Squadron working against the slave trade. A garrison of Royal Marines was based at Ascension from 1823 and Colonel Edward Nicolls became the first commandant.

=== Botany ===
In 1836 the second Beagle voyage visited Ascension. Charles Darwin described it as an arid, treeless island, with nothing growing near the coast. Sparse vegetation inland supported "about six hundred sheep, many goats, a few cows & horses," large numbers of guineafowl imported from the Cape Verde islands, rats, mice, and land crabs; he agreed with the saying attributed to the people of St. Helena that "We know we live on a rock, but the poor people at Ascension live on a cinder." He noted the care taken to sustain "houses, gardens & fields placed near the summit of the central mountain," and cisterns at roadsides to provide drinking water. The springs were carefully managed, "so that a single drop of water may not be lost: indeed the whole island may be compared to a huge ship kept in first-rate order." In commenting on this, he noted René Primevère Lesson's remark "that the English nation alone would have thought of making the island of Ascension a productive spot; any other people would have held it as a mere fortress in the ocean."

In 1843, botanist and explorer Joseph Hooker visited the island. Four years later, Hooker, with much encouragement from Darwin, advised the Royal Navy that with the help of Kew Gardens, they should institute a long-term plan of shipping trees to Ascension. The planted trees would capture more rain and improve the soil, allowing the barren island to become a garden. So, from 1850 and years thereafter, ships came with an assortment of plants from botanical gardens in Argentina, Europe, and South Africa. By the late 1870s Norfolk pines, eucalyptus, bamboo, and banana trees grew in profusion at the highest point of the island, Green Mountain, creating a tropical cloud forest.

=== Astronomical observation ===
Beginning in July 1877, the astronomer Sir David Gill and his wife Isobel spent six months on Ascension Island. This was to take advantage of the near approach of Mars occurring that year. Based on Johannes Kepler's laws of planetary motion, Gill conceived that in pioneering the use of a heliometer, he would be able to accurately measure the position of Mars while in opposition on his own, rather than in combination with many observers simultaneously recording the position of the planet as had been the technique during the time. This is because a heliometer is a telescope that uses a split image to measure the angular separation of celestial bodies. In observing this from near the equator, a greater observable distance would be visible, hence a temporary observatory being decided upon for Ascension.

Although originally based in Georgetown, David and Isobel found the evenings to be too cloudy to make observations of the night sky due to Georgetown being located downwind of orographic clouds that formed nightly over Green Mountain. Isobel quickly endeavoured to find an area less affected by the evening cloud and trekked several miles over lava fields to find a new location. Having found an area on the southwest of the island seemingly less affected, they then had to determine how to move 20 tons of delicate observational equipment to the new location. Fortunately, a small, clear beach was located nearby which was used for landing the equipment by sea. This was later named Mars Bay, a name which it carries to this day and which has since been designated a Nature Reserve. The couple then spent several months camped out at the bay making their observations, assisted by a Kru sailor (at that time called a krooman) and a marine.

All of the effort was ultimately a success, producing a solar distance of 93.08 ± 0.16 million miles, which is a range from 92.92 – 93.24 , since shown to be (just) correct by the modern measurement of 92.9558 M·mi . As a result of his work on the solar parallax, David Gill went on to be appointed Royal Astronomer at the Cape of Good Hope.

=== End of Admiralty rule and early government ===
Between 1872 and 1889, the population of the island was listed as HMS Flora (Tender), under the orders of the Commander-in-Chief, Cape of Good Hope, estimated to number just 150 in 1888. HMS Flora had been the guardship at Ascension from 1865 to 1872 before being ordered south to become the Simonstown depot ship. Five ratings died while on a recreational boat trip in 1879.

In 1899, as part of the British effort in the Second Boer War, the Eastern Telegraph Company (later Cable & Wireless plc) installed the first submarine communications cable from the island, connecting Britain with her colonies in South Africa.

The Island was under direct control of the Board of Admiralty until 1922. In 1922, letters patent made Ascension a dependency of Saint Helena, with control being officially handed over to the Eastern Telegraph Company from the Admiralty on 20 October 1922. The island was managed by the head of the Eastern Telegraph Company on the island until 1964 when the British Government appointed an administrator to represent the Governor of Saint Helena in Ascension.

=== World War II ===
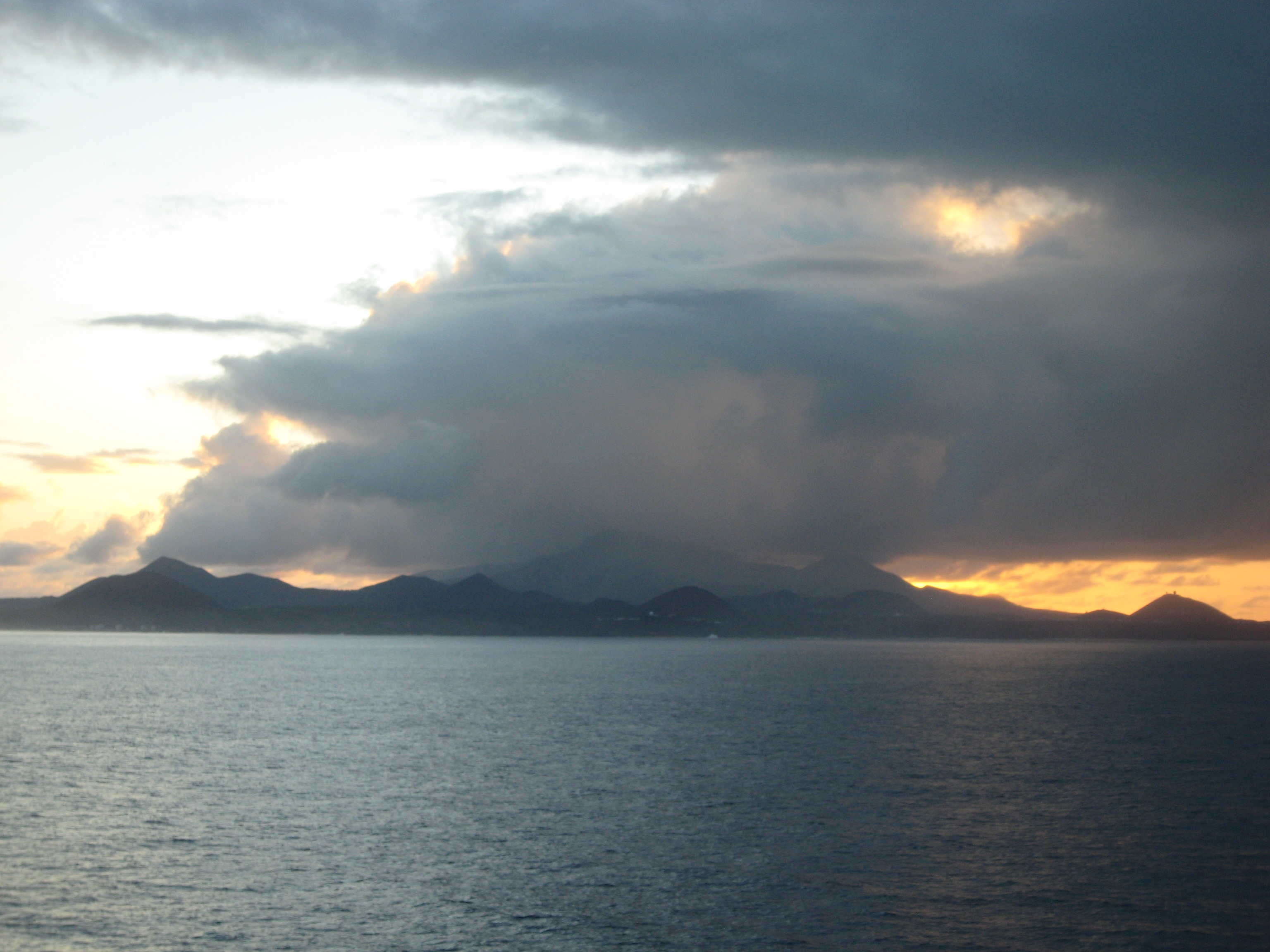
Ascension Island viewed from the south

During World War II, to supply and augment extensive amphibious aircraft antisubmarine patrol operations ongoing from the early days of the war, the United States built an airbase on Ascension Island, known as "Wideawake", after a nearby colony of sooty terns (locally called 'wideawake' birds because of their loud, distinctive constant (day-and-night) cawing chatter). The airbase, which was under construction by the 38th Combat Engineer Battalion of the Army Corps of Engineers, was unexpectedly visited by two British Fairey Swordfish torpedo planes on 15 June 1942. According to one of the pilots, Peter Jinks, the planes were fired upon before being recognised as allies. The Swordfish had to land on the unfinished airstrip, thus becoming the first aircraft to land on Ascension Island proper, which had long served as an anti-submarine warfare base for Consolidated PBY Catalina flying boats. The event was commemorated with a postage stamp 15 June 1982.

The airfield was used by the US military as a stopping point for American aircraft crossing the Atlantic Ocean on the way to theatres of operation in Europe and Africa. American bombers based at Wideawake were engaged in the Laconia incident. The only local military action during World War II occurred on 9 December 1941. At around mid-day, the German submarine U-124 approached Georgetown on the surface with the intention of sinking any ships at anchor or shelling the cable station. Fort Bedford, a two-gun shore battery at Cross Hill, above Georgetown, fired on the submarine. The guns scored no hits but the U-boat submerged and retreated. The battery remains largely intact, together with its guns, BL 5.5 inch Mark I naval guns removed from HMS Hood during a refit in Malta in 1938. The airbase fell into disuse following the American departure at the end of World War II.

=== Later military involvement ===
With the Space Race and the Cold War, the Americans returned in 1956. Wideawake Airfield expanded in the mid-1960s. The runway was extended, widened, and improved to allow its use by large aircraft, and later to act as an emergency runway for the Space Shuttle, although the Shuttle never had to use it. At the time, it was the world's longest airport runway. The United States Space Force uses the island as part of its Eastern Range. NASA established a tracking station on the island in 1967, which it operated for more than 20 years before closing it down in 1990.

Ascension was the shore terminal for the furthest down range installation of the Atlantic Missile Impact Location System (MILS), an acoustic system for locating splashdown of test nose cones. The MILS hydrophones that were located in the SOFAR channel for broad area coverage have played a significant role in long range acoustic transmission studies and incidents. The island's location makes it a first point of Atlantic reception for acoustics from the other oceans. As an example the Ascension hydrophones received and the site processed signals generated near Heard Island in the Indian Ocean some 9,200 km (5,700 mi; 5,000 nmi) from the Ascension arrays and passing around Africa. The Ascension array was one of those involved in the Vela incident acoustic signal in which there were correlated acoustic arrivals with the time and estimated location of the double flash detected by the Vela satellite.

A joint Government Communications Headquarters and National Security Agency signals intercept station was also established on Ascension during the Cold War. The island retains a role in space exploration: the European Space Agency now operates an Ariane monitoring facility there. The BBC Atlantic Relay Station was installed in 1966 for short-wave broadcasts to Africa and South America and because of the BBC's considerable resources, eventually BBC External Services began sourcing requirements generally for the Island through BBC Engineering Purchasing Department based in 4 Cavendish Square, London; items were requisitioned and ordered from suppliers, delivered to export packers, Evan Cook and shipped to Ascension on RMS St Helena.

In 1982, the British task force used Ascension Island as a staging post during the Falklands War. After strengthening and improving the structure, the Royal Air Force deployed a fleet of Avro Vulcan bombers and Handley Page Victor tankers at the airfield. Vulcans launched the opening shots of the British offensive from Ascension in Operation Black Buck. The RAF also used the base to supply the task force. Because of the increase in air traffic during the war, Wideawake, with up to 400 movements of all types each day, was one of the busiest airfields in the world for a short period. The Royal Navy's fleet stopped at Ascension for refuelling on the way. Following the war, the British retained an increased presence on the island, establishing RAF Ascension Island, and providing a refuelling stop for the regular airlink between RAF Brize Norton in Oxfordshire, and RAF Mount Pleasant in the Falkland Islands.

=== Twenty-first century ===
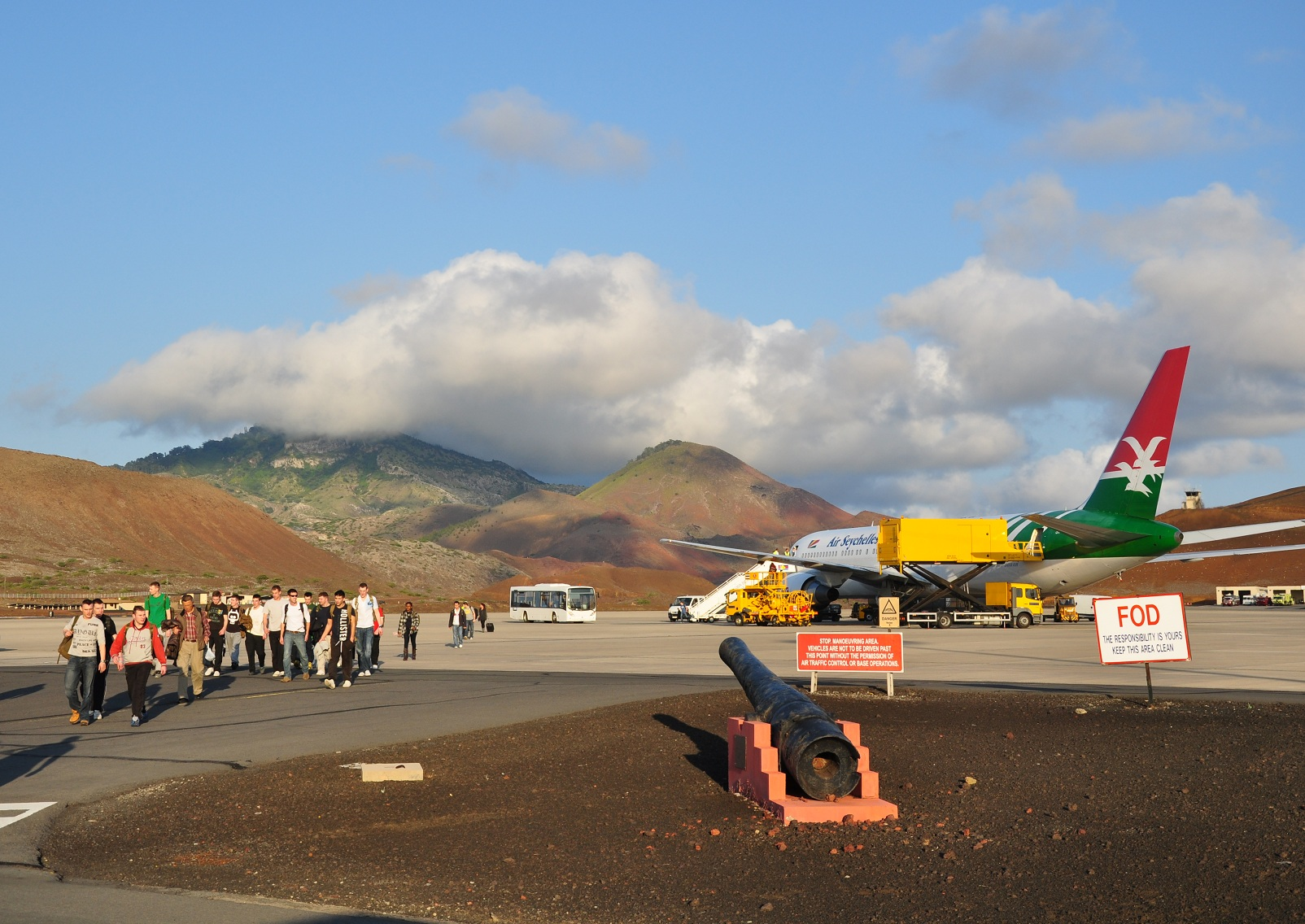
RAF Ascension Island

As of 2004, it was reported that the Composite Signals Organisation, an arm of GCHQ, continued to operate a signals interception facility at Cat Hill on Ascension.

In 2008, British diplomats at the United Nations Commission on the Limits of the Continental Shelf (UN CLCS), requested sovereignty over 200,000 km^{2} (77,220 sq mi) of submarine territory around the island. This would enable exploration into possible new reserves of oil, gas and minerals, though none are thought to exist.

In 2009, the St Helena, Ascension and Tristan da Cunha Constitution Order 2009 elevated Ascension Island, and Tristan da Cunha to equal constituent parts of the territory alongside Saint Helena, with their own governments and established the position of Governor of Ascension. Per section 143 of the Constitution Order 2009 the person appointed as Governor of Saint Helena is ex officio Governor of Ascension.

In 2016, the United States Department of Energy started operating a mobile climate research facility on the island. It is operated by the Atmospheric Radiation Measurement Climate Research Facility (ARM) near the South East Crater, south of the Green Mountain summit. The field campaign requires the mobile facility to be operational for about 17 months until October 2017.

The island hosts one of four dedicated ground antennas that assist in the operation of the Global Positioning System (GPS) navigation system along with those on Diego Garcia (British Indian Ocean Territory), Kwajalein (Marshall Islands), and Cape Canaveral, Florida. NASA and the Air Force Research Laboratory operate a Meter-Class Autonomous Telescope (MCAT) on Ascension as part of the deep space surveillance system for tracking orbital debris, which can be a hazard to spacecraft and astronauts.

Due to the disrepair, the runway was shut down in 2016 to non-mission related or emergency flights. The airfield was cobbled together over numerous efforts beginning in World War 2, including multiple extensions, the addition of turning blisters and fast exit taxi-ways, and mill and overlay repairs. Beginning in 2020, the airfield underwent a complete reconstruction effort which brought it up to modern standards to support both US and UK air force airframes. The runway itself is an engineered base composed of granite which was imported from Nova Scotia, Canada and sand from Georgia, United States, under strict fumigation and inspection control of the on-island conservation group. During the construction effort, all material was required to be purchased new to avoid the introduction of any non-native species which could impact the native flora and fauna. To avoid disruptions to island operations, the runway was completed in two phases, each half at approximately 5,000 linear feet. The construction team also updated the lighting system, drainage, airfield signs, and roads connecting the airfield to Georgetown and the US base. The runway was completed and reopened in 2023.

In 2023, the United Kingdom government announced that it was considering a proposal to send migrants arriving in the UK by boat to Ascension Island, should the Supreme Court rule the Rwanda asylum plan illegal.

== Geography ==
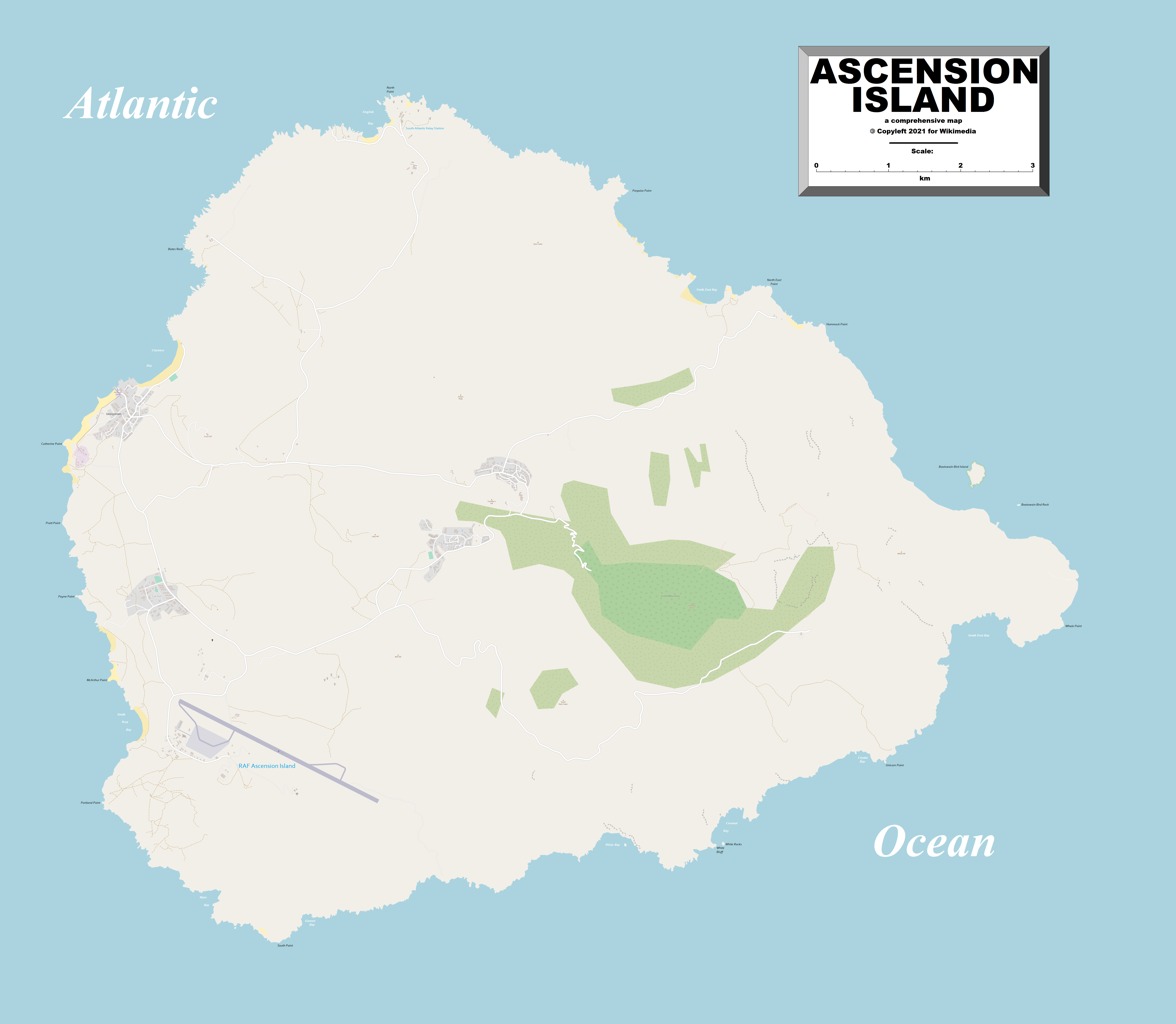
A detailed map of Ascension Island

The main island has an area of approximately 88 square kilometres (34 sq mi). A volcanic peak, Green Mountain, rises 859 metres (2,818 ft) above sea level from 100 kilometres (62 mi) west of the Mid-Atlantic Ridge. Much of the island is a wasteland of lava flows and cinder cones; forty-four distinct dormant craters have been identified.

=== Climate ===
Ascension has a hot desert climate (BWh, according to the Köppen climate classification). The temperatures at the coast average from 22.7 to 27.8 °C (72.9 to 82.0 °F), and about 5 to 6 °C (9.0 to 10.8 °F) cooler at the highest point. Rain showers may occur at any time during the year, but tend to be heavier between June and September. Although the island is in the tropical zone, average annual rainfall is very low. The cause of this might be the relatively low temperature of the ocean water, as the Benguela Current and South Equatorial Current flow northward west of Africa. These currents bring cooling effects around the eastern South Atlantic Ocean. Tropical cyclones also occur only rarely in the South Atlantic Ocean which might be caused by the same phenomenon, and by strong vertical wind shear.

Climate data for Georgetown, Ascension Island
Month	Jan	Feb	Mar	Apr	May	Jun	Jul	Aug	Sep	Oct	Nov	Dec	Year
Record high °C (°F)	31.7 (89.1)	31.7 (89.1)	31.7 (89.1)	32.2 (90.0)	31.7 (89.1)	30.6 (87.1)	30.6 (87.1)	28.9 (84.0)	28.9 (84.0)	28.9 (84.0)	30.0 (86.0)	30.6 (87.1)	32.2 (90.0)
Mean daily maximum °C (°F)	28.3 (82.9)	29.4 (84.9)	30.0 (86.0)	30.0 (86.0)	28.9 (84.0)	27.8 (82.0)	27.2 (81.0)	26.1 (79.0)	26.1 (79.0)	26.1 (79.0)	26.7 (80.1)	27.2 (81.0)	27.8 (82.0)
Mean daily minimum °C (°F)	22.8 (73.0)	23.9 (75.0)	24.4 (75.9)	24.4 (75.9)	23.9 (75.0)	22.8 (73.0)	22.2 (72.0)	21.1 (70.0)	21.1 (70.0)	21.1 (70.0)	22.2 (72.0)	22.6 (72.7)	22.7 (72.9)
Record low °C (°F)	18.9 (66.0)	20.0 (68.0)	21.1 (70.0)	20.6 (69.1)	19.4 (66.9)	19.4 (66.9)	19.4 (66.9)	18.3 (64.9)	17.2 (63.0)	18.3 (64.9)	17.8 (64.0)	17.8 (64.0)	17.2 (63.0)
Average rainfall mm (inches)	8 (0.3)	10 (0.4)	38 (1.5)	30 (1.2)	10 (0.4)	15 (0.6)	13 (0.5)	10 (0.4)	10 (0.4)	13 (0.5)	8 (0.3)	8 (0.3)	173 (6.8)
Average rainy days (≥ 0.3 mm)	7	5	7	8	6	8	7	8	10	12	8	8	94
Average relative humidity (%)	74	73	73	73	70	69	69	70	73	73	72	73	72
Mean monthly sunshine hours	229	224	276	267	264	260	239	217	165	161	159	198	2,659
Source 1: Deutscher Wetterdienst
Source 2: Danish Meteorological Institute

== Geology ==
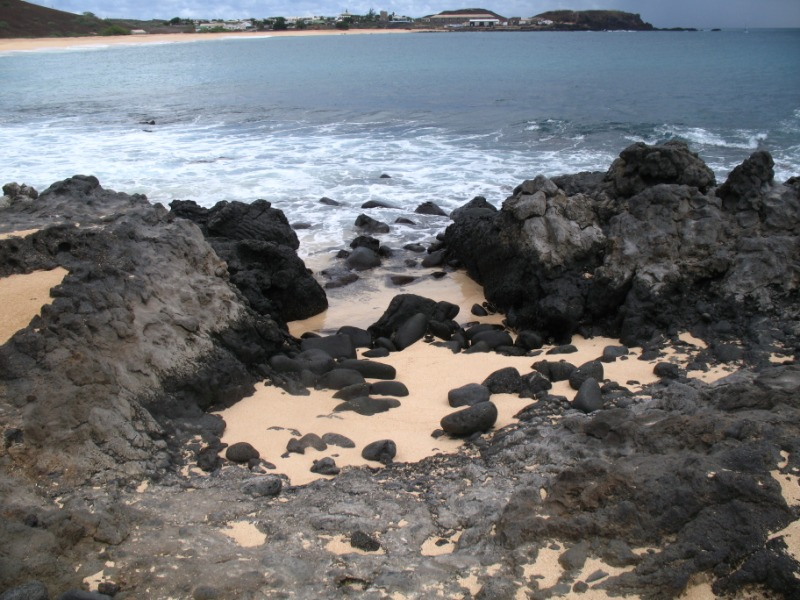
Black volcanic rocks

Ascension is a geologically young formation, the tip of an undersea volcano which rose above the waves only a million years ago. Although volcanic activity is mainly associated with the Mid-Atlantic Ridge plate boundary 80 km to the east, Ascension also displays some features which are commonly attributed to "hotspot" volcanism. Such volcanism is typically assumed to arise from a deep mantle thermal plume from the core-mantle boundary. Alternatively it may result from minor deformations of the oceanic crust that cause extension and permit magma to rise passively up from the asthenosphere. Ascension is considered active and could have erupted as recently as 500 years ago, but the exact eruption date is elusive. Due to the low rainfall and geologically recent eruptions, its soil consists mostly of clinker.

The island consists of a wide range of alkaline rocks atypical for oceanic islands, ranging from basalt through trachyandesite and trachyte to rhyolite.

== Ecology ==
=== Flora ===
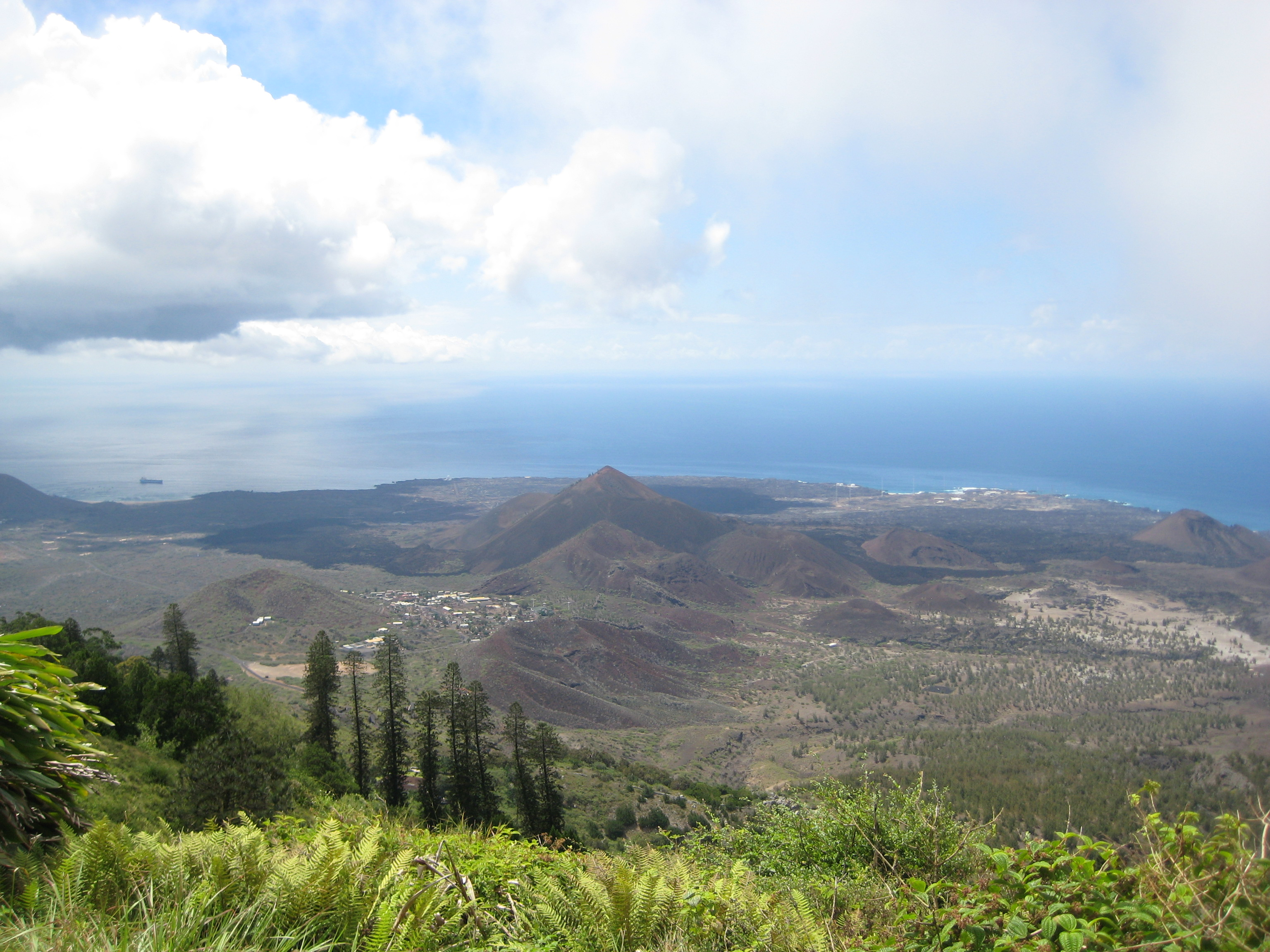
The island viewed from atop Green Mountain, looking West towards Two Boats Village and Georgetown

The endemic flora includes plants like Pteris adscensionis, Asplenium ascensionis, Euphorbia origanoides as well as the extinct species Oldenlandia adscensionis, Sporobolus durus and Dryopteris ascensionis. Anogramma ascensionis (Ascension Island parsley fern) was thought to have become extinct due to habitat loss, until four plants were found on the island in 2010. Over 60 specimens were then successfully cultivated. Portuguese explorers released goats in the 1500s, which ate many species to extinction. The later introduction of rabbits, sheep, rats and donkeys, and over 200 imported species further marginalised the original flora.

By 1843 the island was barren with few plants. However, due to the introduction of species by the British, Ascension Island's Green Mountain is now one of the few large-scale planned forests, and is gradually growing with each year. Its highest point is at 859 metres (2,818 ft). Non-indigenous plants teem there, and the crown of Green Mountain is a lush halo of bamboo. Flanking one side is a large stand of tall Norfolk pine, trees planted by British mariners, which were to have been used as replacement masts for sailing ships. In June 2005 the first National Park on Ascension Island, the Green Mountain National Park, was opened.

Prosopis juliflora, a type of mesquite known as "Mexican thorn", was introduced by BBC engineers to bind the dry top soil when they arrived in 1966 to construct a shortwave relay station. It has thrived on the barren lava of the island – an estimated 38,000 bushes existed by 2016. Its spread has been destructive to other species, and current encroachment on the edges of beaches threatens those that use this space, such as the green turtle. Its hardy taproots can extend to 30 metres (98 ft) deep. Local authorities are considering means of controlling or eradicating it.

=== Fauna ===
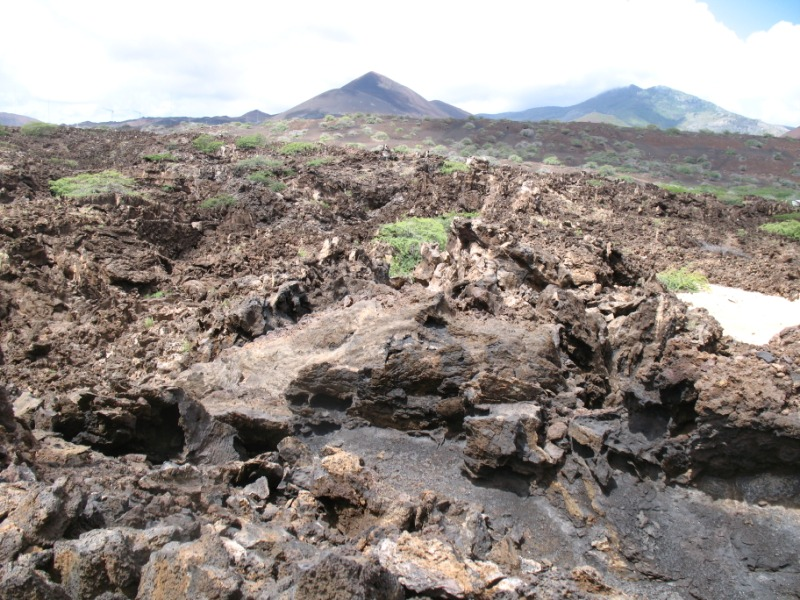
Lava fields

A variety of mammals have been introduced: donkeys, sheep, domestic cats, rabbits, and rats among others. Introduced reptiles consist of three species of lizard: Liolaemus wiegmannii, Hemidactylus mercatorius, and Anolis sagrei.

Endemic insect species include the minute, wingless Psocopteran Troglotroctes ashmoleorum, that has been found in caves and between lava blocks, and in two anchialine pools on the island are two species of shrimp, Procaris ascensionis, and Typhlatya rogersi. The largest native land animal is the land crab Johngarthia lagostoma (formerly Gecarcinus lagostoma). The largest land animal recorded at Ascension is an Indian elephant, when the ship Crownshield visited briefly in 1796 whilst en route to the US.

Offshore, there is a variety of open-ocean fish, including sharks, wahoo, tuna, bonito, barracuda, marlin, blackfish and sailfish. The protected green turtle is perhaps the most notable of the endemic fauna, coming ashore to lay their eggs on the beaches from November to May. Turtles were regularly harvested until 1930, when the practice was banned. By 1970 the turtle population had begun to rebound. From the 1970s, when records began, to 2014, green turtle nesting increased by 500%, resulting in some 24,000 nests being laid on the island's main beaches each year.

On land are found such non-native birds as canaries, francolins, mynas, sparrows, and waxbills. Sooty terns or "wideawake birds" nest in great seashore lava "fairs". Other seabirds include some types of boobies, petrels, and tropicbirds (named boatswain, pronounced BO-sun birds, by the inhabitants of the island), white tern, brown noddy, black noddy and Ascension frigatebird. The Ascension crake became extinct around the beginning of the nineteenth century, and the Ascension night heron likely became extinct in the fifteen hundreds.

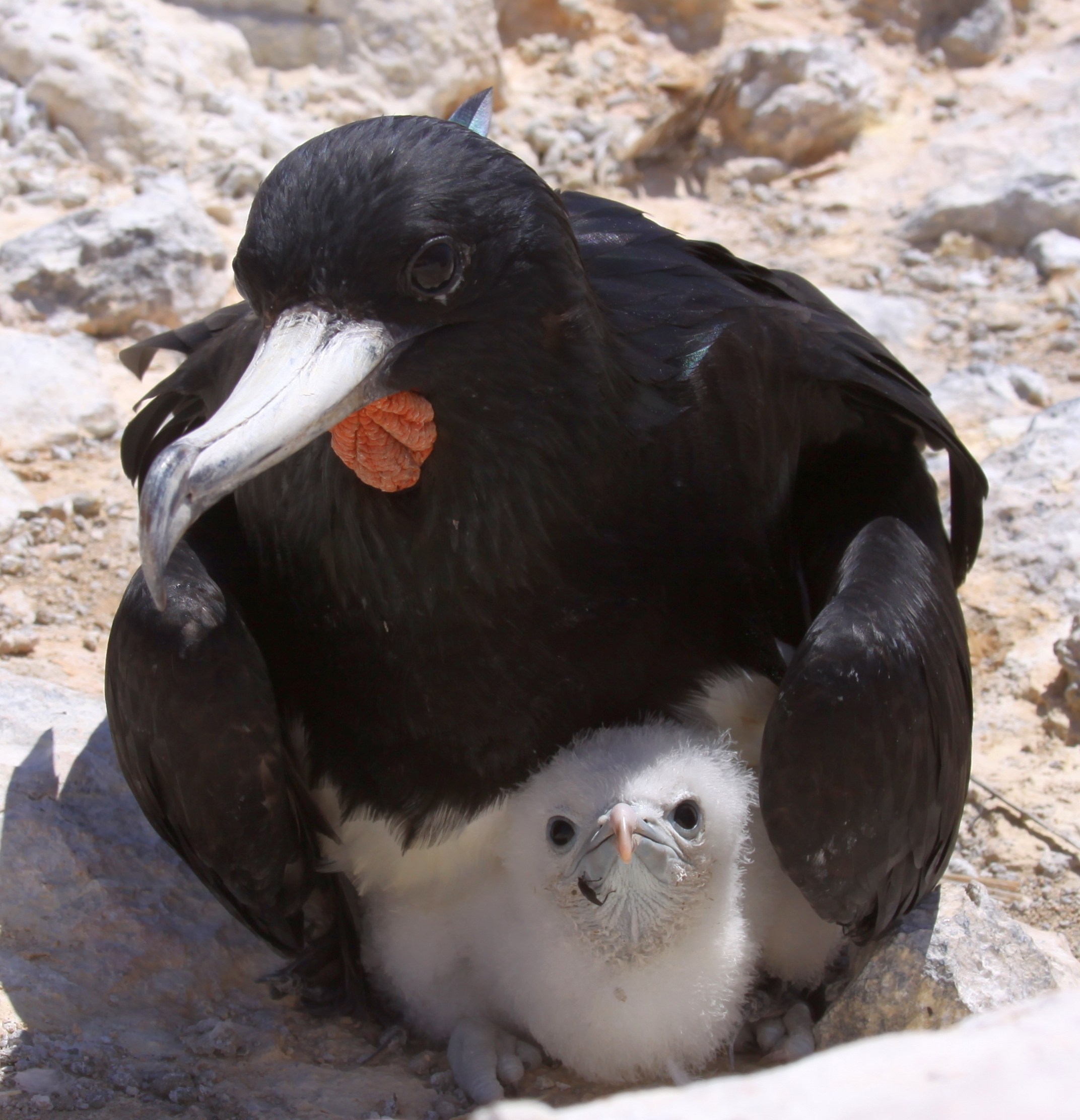
Male frigatebird with chick on Boatswain Bird Island

Off the east coast of Ascension is the islet of Boatswain Bird Island. It is a haven for sea birds providing refuge from the rats, cats and people that came to Ascension Island from Europe and Africa. Following a successful campaign headed by the Royal Society for the Protection of Birds, the main island was in 2006 declared free of feral cats, and sea birds are now once again nesting on Ascension Island.

=== Bird life ===
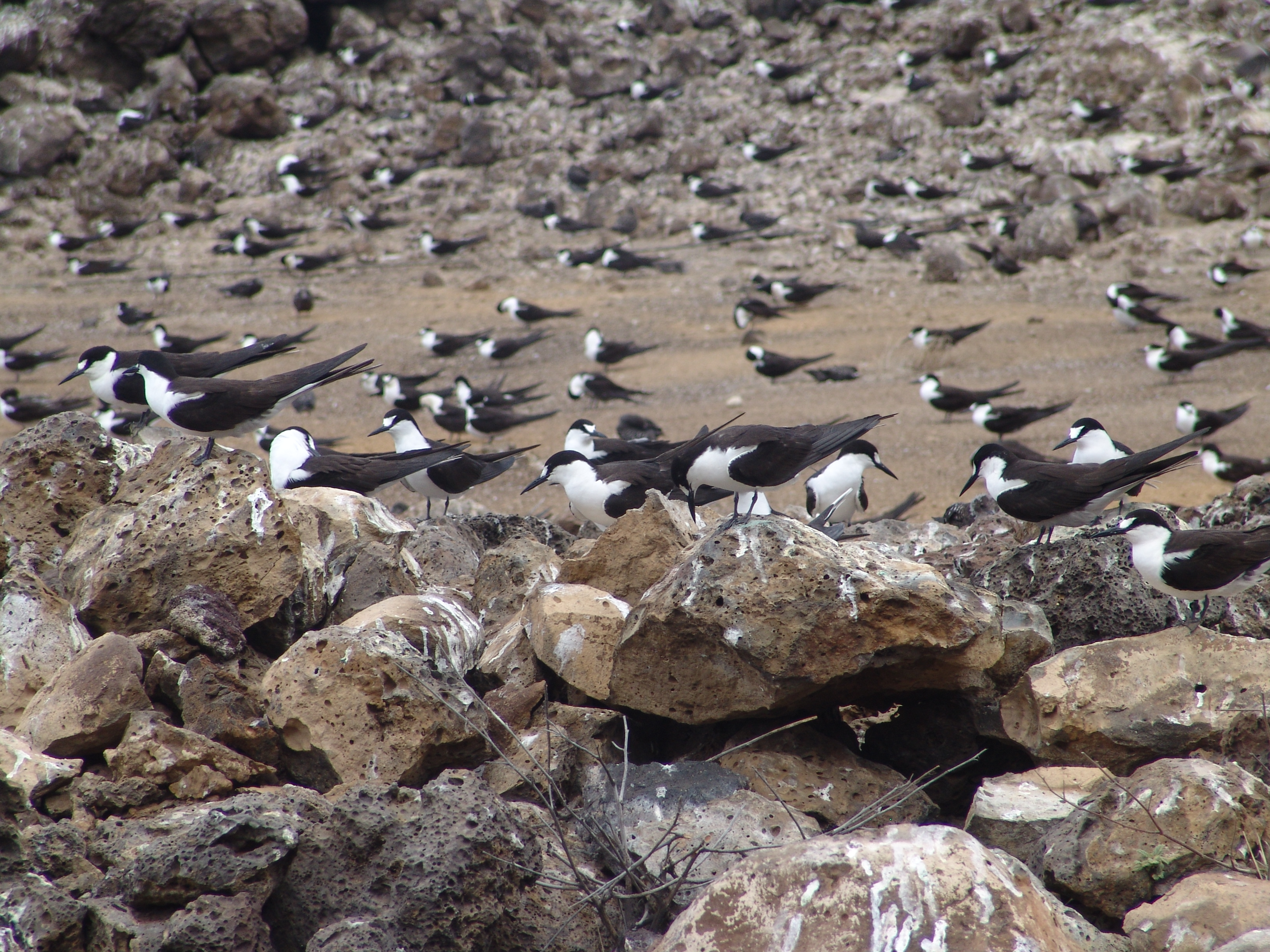
A few of the 130,000 Atlantic sooty terns at Mars Bay breeding grounds, Ascension Island

After cats were introduced to Ascension Island in 1815, large seabird breeding colonies were quickly wiped out everywhere except in small cat-inaccessible areas, such as on the offshore Boatswain Bird Island. Following a two-year campaign, feral cats were eradicated by 2004 and seabirds began to recolonise the main island.

Ascension Island, including fourteen inshore stacks and marine habitat extending out for 3 nautical miles (5.6 km; 3.5 mi) from the coastline, has been identified as an Important Bird Area (IBA) by BirdLife International as a breeding site for seabirds. Birds for which the IBA is significant include red-billed tropicbirds, Ascension frigatebirds (an endemic breeder), sooty terns and black noddies. The island was formerly home to both the endemic Ascension night heron, and the Ascension crake,which has been extinct since the early nineteenth century.

=== Marine Protected Area ===
In January 2016 the UK Government announced that an area around Ascension Island was to become a huge marine reserve, to protect its varied and unique ecosystem, including some of the largest marlin in the world, large populations of green turtle, and the island's own species of frigate bird.

On 22 August 2019, the Ascension Island Government announced the designation of 100% of Ascension's Exclusive Economic Zone (EEZ) as a Marine Protected Area (MPA). The EEZ covers an area of over 440,000 square kilometres (170,000 sq mi), making it one of the largest in the world. Within the MPA it is proposed that commercial fishing and mineral extraction will be prohibited. Legislation is now being brought forward and development of a management plan is underway. These will be put into place subject to confirmation that the ongoing costs of management, monitoring and enforcement have been provided by the UK government.

== Government ==
Ascension forms part of the British overseas territory of Saint Helena, Ascension and Tristan da Cunha. Executive authority is ultimately vested in King Charles III, who is represented by the Governor of Ascension. The Governor, who is in turn represented on the island by an appointed Administrator, resides in Jamestown, Saint Helena.

=== Island Council ===
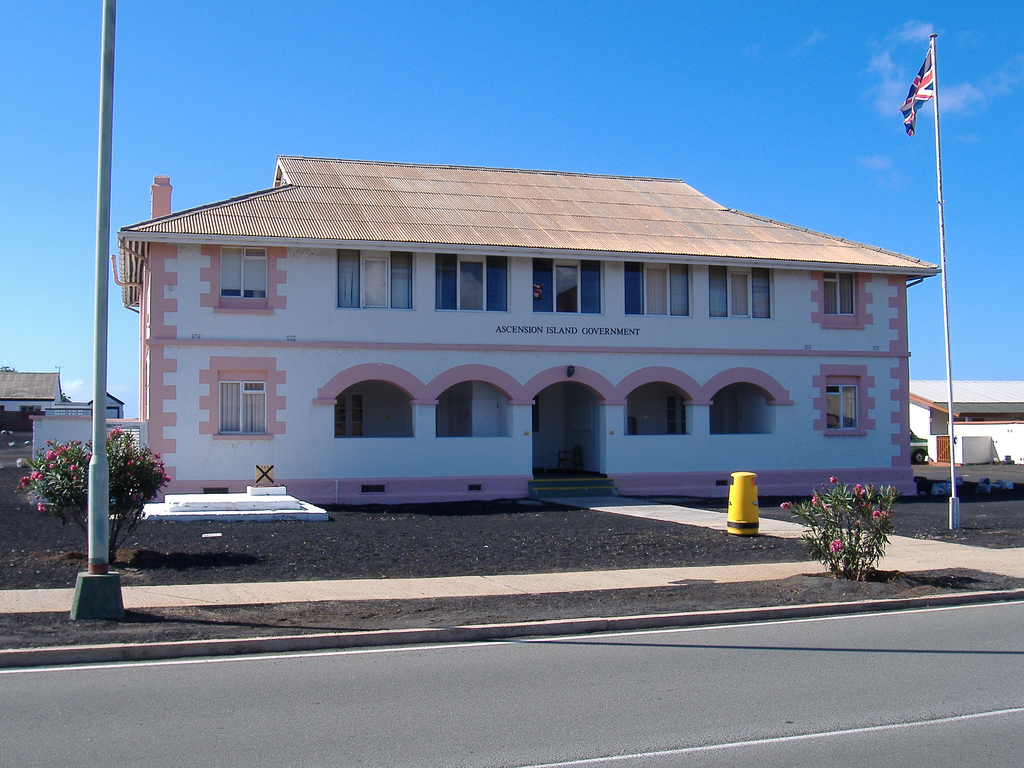
Ascension Government House

As a result of changes in the constitutional arrangements for Ascension Island, a unicameral Legislative Council with advisory powers was introduced in 2002. The first Island Council of seven members was elected, and took office on 1 November 2002. This council was dissolved by order of the Governor of Saint Helena on 24 October 2005, and a new election was held on 16 November 2005. 697 electors chose among ten candidates contesting the seven seats.

Six of the seven members resigned in January 2007 in the belief that they were "assisting to legitimise a democracy that doesn't really exist on Ascension Island". A memorandum sent by a group of Ascension Island residents suggests that the handling of economic development, taxation and representation led to the dispute and that all six councillors resigned (five of them at once). The memorandum states, "The elected Council has been used to legitimise an illegitimate system that has never been a true democracy and, it seems, was never intended to be." The counter-argument was that, as the island has no indigenous population whatsoever, it is in an unusual political position. Consequently, a general election was called, but by the close of nominations, there were only two candidates. The election was abandoned, and the governor suspended the Island Council for 12 months. It was stated that an election would take place in April 2008 but following consultations this was extended to October. Eventually, candidates were elected to form a new Island Council, which was sworn in on 27 October 2008.

On 26 September 2019, a general election of the Island Council was held. This followed the dissolution of the previous Council on 1 September 2019, in accordance with the Island Government (Ascension) Ordinance 2008. Seven candidates ran for five available Councillor positions, with electors being permitted to cast up to five votes each. Of 518 registered electors 150 electors cast 498 votes. The five successful Councillors were sworn in on 26 September 2019.

=== Laws ===
Ascension Island has its own local system of law, much of which is based on the laws of Saint Helena and some parts of English law with modifications. The Island Council advises on new or revised laws. Where local legislation does not exist, Saint Helena law may be used where appropriate and suitable for local adaptation, or specific Ascension Island law is enacted. Employment legislation is a mixture of contract law and the Workmen's Protection Ordinance, which guarantees a contract, and obliges employers to provide free accommodation, medical cover, food (or a food allowance), and travel.

The Saint Helena, Ascension and Tristan da Cunha Constitution Order 2009 was made by Queen Elizabeth II and the Privy Council on 8 July and came into operation in September 2009. The new constitution replaced the 1988 version and among other changes limited the Governor's powers, included a Bill of Rights, established independence of the judiciary and the public service, and designated the Governor of St Helena as, concurrently, the Governor for Ascension and Tristan da Cunha. It ended the "dependency" status of Ascension and Tristan da Cunha on Saint Helena that had been in place, for administrative convenience, since 1922.

=== Relationship to St Helena ===
Although the first Island Council was elected in 2002, between 1922 and 2009 Ascension was a dependency of St Helena with an appointed Administrator representing the UK Government on the island under the purview of the Governor of St Helena.

Whilst the Ascension Island Government is distinct from the St Helena Government, the Governor of St Helena is also Governor of Ascension. The executive authority of Ascension is exercised on behalf of His Majesty by the Governor, either directly or through the Administrator of Ascension and other officers subordinate to the Governor. In practice the Administrator is the head of the Ascension Island Government and is responsible for the day-to-day running of the Government.

In 2019, the UK House of Commons Foreign Affairs Select Committee published its report Global Britain and the British Overseas Territories: Resetting the relationship, following an investigation into the relationship between the UK and the Overseas Territories. The report recommended that Ascension and Tristan da Cunha be recognised as Overseas Territories in their own right (paragraph 48 / recommendation 8):

The Committee notes that the Overseas Territory of St Helena includes the separate and distinct territories of Ascension Island and Tristan da Cunha. These are both inhabited territories with a population that is not directly connected to St Helena and have their own identities, elected governments and flags. Therefore, Ascension Island and Tristan da Cunha should be treated with equality as British Overseas Territories in their own right and the FCO should change their status to this effect. However, this change should not necessarily imply that the practice of St Helena, Ascension Island and Tristan da Cunha sharing the same Governor should come to an end.

To date the UK Government has not responded to the committee's recommendation.

== Demographics ==
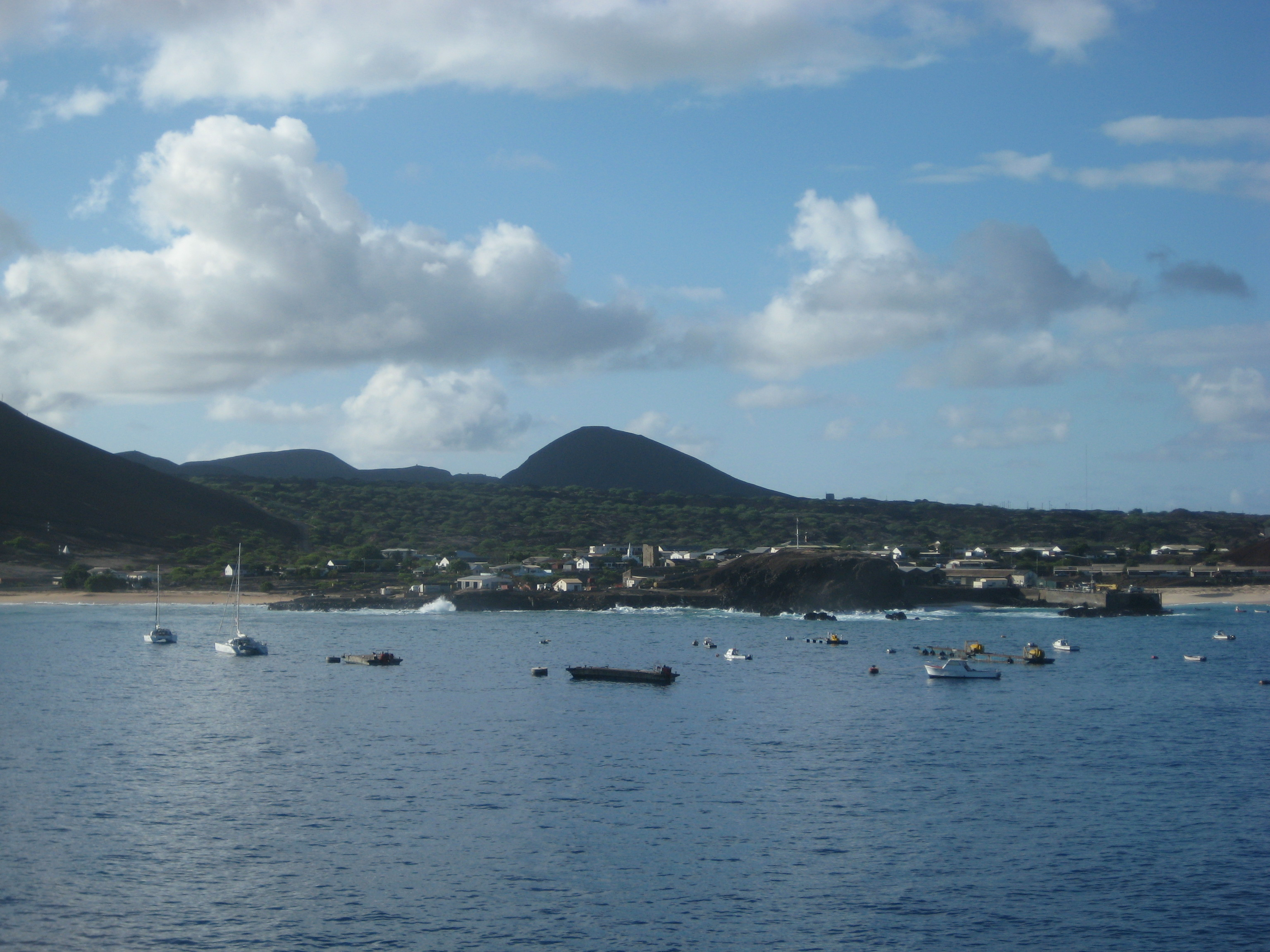
Georgetown, the island's primary settlement, comprises the island's post office, police station, court and government house, as well as its supermarket and the port: a small pier where supplies are off-loaded with a connection for a fuel pipeline.

In the February 2016 census, 806 people were recorded living in Ascension Island, 556 from Saint Helena (nicknamed the "Saints") and 250 people of other nationalities. RAF Ascension Island is made up of 17 staff. There has never been an indigenous population on the island.

There are five settlements:

- Georgetown (the main civilian settlement and capital of the island)
- Two Boats (a civilian village, with its school)
- Cat Hill (the United States's main base on the island)
- Traveller's Hill (Royal Air Force base)
- Wideawake Airfield (with the Royal Air Force station).

Additionally, there are some cottages on Green Mountain, occasionally occupied by visitors, and the Residency, the official residence of the Administrator.

To enter Ascension Island, individuals must apply for a visa prior to their arrival. There are no native or permanent civilian populations. Anyone who lives on Ascension is there for work or to accompany someone who is working. A contract of employment is a requirement to stay on the island for longer than three months, though short-term visits by tourists are possible with prior approval. The British government put in place a policy that there is no "right of abode" in Ascension Island. This means that people are allowed to remain in Ascension only with the permission of the Administrator or the Governor. As such, unless they are able to satisfy one of the categories of visas and be issued such, they are not permitted on the island. As the local newspaper The Islander reported at the time, it was raised by some former Council members and four expatriate employees that whilst it was agreed there was no right of abode, the UK authorities had previously indicated it would consider changing the law to allow the rights of abode and property purchase, but decided not to do so.

=== Notable people ===
- Leendert Hasenbosch, (ca. 1695 – probably end of 1724), a Dutch employee of the Dutch East India Company. He was marooned on the then uninhabited Ascension Island as a punishment for sodomy. He wrote a diary until his presumed death.
- William Delacombe (1860–1911), an English cricketer. He was born at Georgetown, Ascension Island.

== Culture ==
There are Scouting and Guiding groups on Saint Helena and Ascension Island. Scouting was established on Ascension Island in November 1973, having been established on St Helena island in 1912.

The Islander is a weekly newspaper that is edited, printed and distributed on the island. It has been published since 1971. It is available online.

English is the official language.

== Economy ==
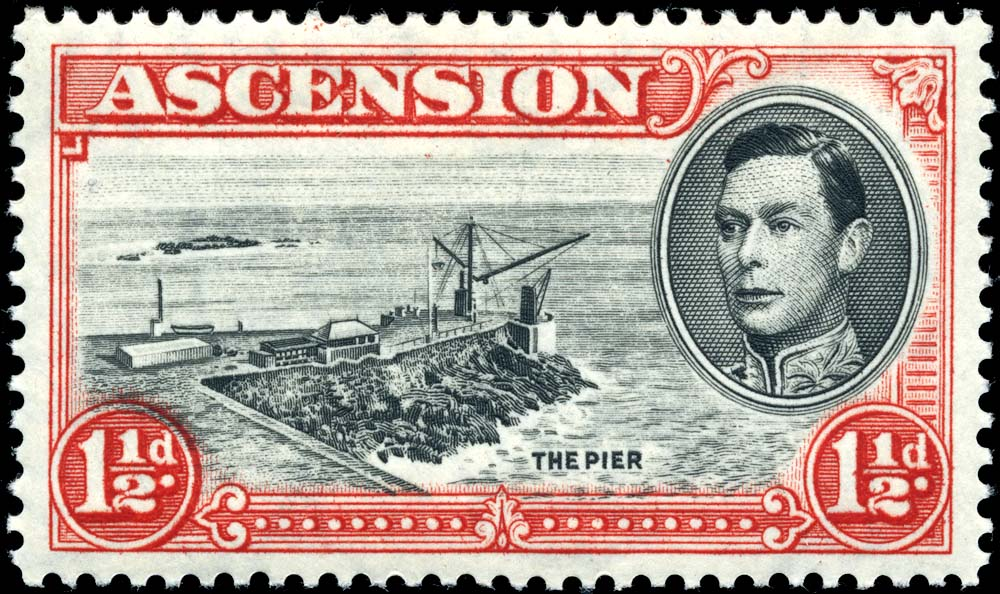
View of "The Pier" (1938)

The main economic activity on the island is centred on the military bases at Wideawake Airfield, and the BBC World Service's Atlantic Relay station. The Ministry of Defence estate and facilities are managed by the infrastructure support provider Mitie. A former feature of Ascension was a 70,000-tonne tanker permanently moored offshore that was operated by Maersk as a bulk fuel facility. In December 2002, this was replaced by an on-shore Petroleum Supply Depot under military management, with fuel still being delivered by a chartered tanker, Maersk Rapier, which operates on an MOD resupply contract for both Ascension and the Falkland Islands every two months. Fuel for the island is transferred via a floating hose, which is connected to the on-shore depot at the island's pier head and to the ship at anchor.

The main export items are Ascension Island postage stamps, first issued in 1922, and, since 2010, commemorative coins (which are legal tender but non-circulating) and commercial fishing licences for long-line tuna fishing vessels operating to ICCAT quotas.

A secondary export is the international internet domain code .ac, which small UK educational colleges and science museums are favouring due to its similarity to .ac.uk, the domain code reserved for well-established UK academic institutions. In December 2013, The Pirate Bay (one of the most well-known file piracy websites in the world) moved to .ac following the seizure of their .sx website.

As of February 2021, there was no trade union presence on the island.

=== Tourism and related industries ===
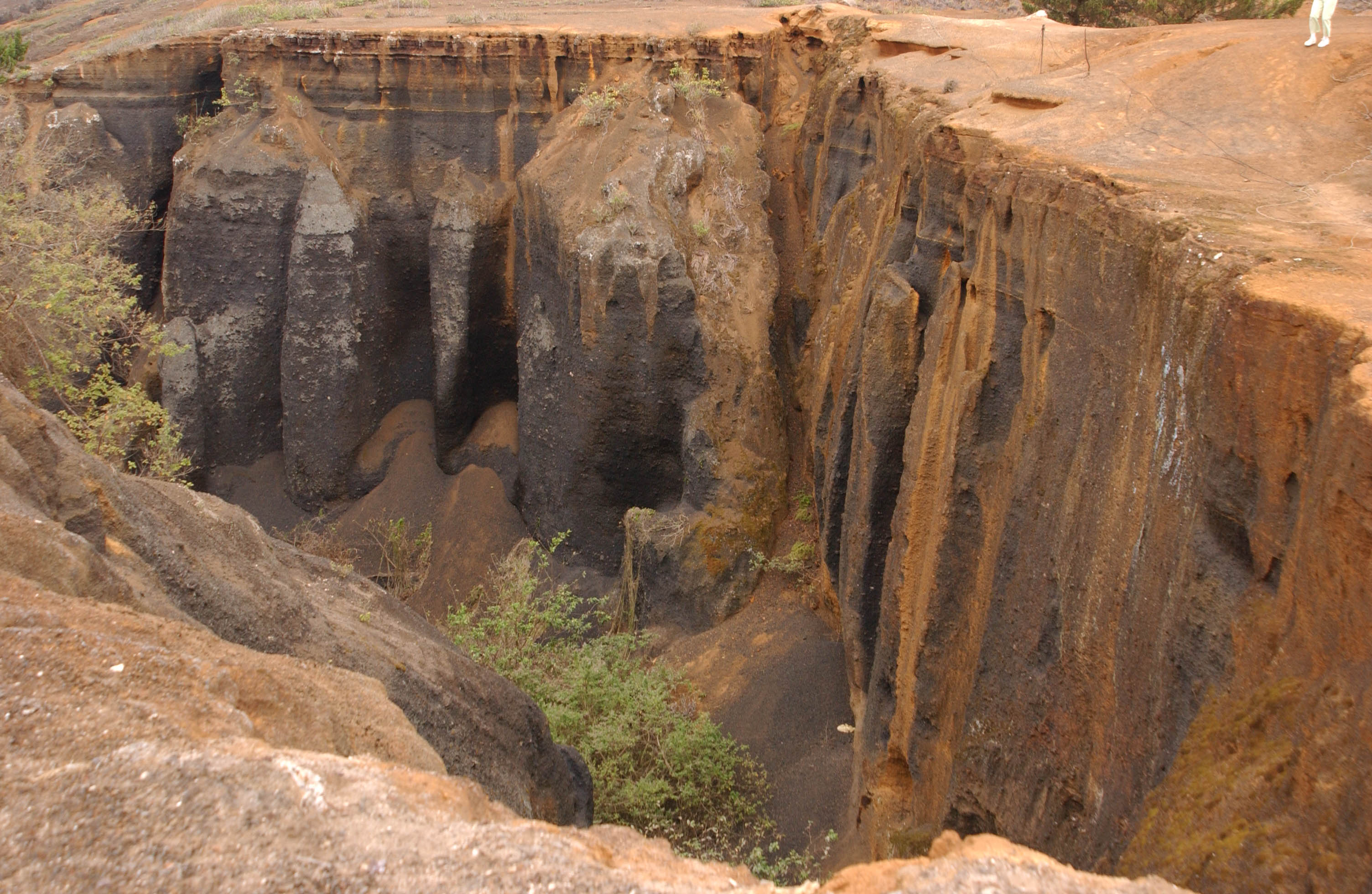
Devil's Ashpit

Until 2002, tourism was virtually non-existent because of the inaccessibility of the island to transport, the absence of guest accommodation and the need for a sponsor. Limited air travel has, however, been made available in recent years to the public by the RAF, and the Georgetown Obsidian Hotel and a number of guest cottages have been opened. All visitors are required to obtain an entry permit before travelling. Sport fishing is the main attraction for many of the visitors. The island also boasts the One Boat Golf Club, which is sometimes referred to as the worst golf course in the world, with greens made of sand mixed with diesel oil, fairways consisting primary of finely crushed lava rock, and roughs that consist of large lava rock stones, boulders, and dormant lava flows.

Ascension Island Government does not issue visas to citizens of the following countries and territories: Belarus, China, Egypt, Hong Kong, Iran, Libya, Macau, North Korea, Russia, Syria, Taiwan, Ukraine, and Vietnam.

=== Communications ===
The island hosts many communications and relay stations, exploiting its mid-Atlantic position. Both the BBC and Cable & Wireless Worldwide (owned by Vodafone since 2012) have communications posts there. Ascension has one local radio station and one relayed from St Helena. It also receives broadcasts from the British Forces Broadcasting Service and television services for the US military.

The island provided a base for a NASA communications dish between 1967 and 1989 located near Devils Ashpit. The island was chosen due to its central location in the Atlantic. The station had a 30-ft dish and a VHF antenna. Initially build for the Manned Space Flight Network it became part of STADAN. Furthermore the site hosted another 30-ft antenna for the Deep Space Network until 1969 that had the number DSS-72.

After the closure of the NASA station the operation of the downrange tracking stations was transferred to the Air Force’s Eastern Space and Missile Center, which is today the Space Launch Delta 45. The installation is located on the military bases on the western site of the island alongside space radar installations and GPS ground antennas.

To replace the role of the NASA station for the European Space Agency (ESA) it also established a tracking station on the north-eastern part of the island in 1990 that tracks the Ariane 6 and Vega rockets shortly after their launch from Kourou in French Guiana. In the past it was also used for Ariane 4, Ariane 5 and Soyuz rockets. The site hosts further installations including a VHF ground station for the SVOM gamma ray telescope, a REGINA GNSS reference station, a DORIS terminal, a sensor for the Total Carbon Column Observing Network and a ground station for a private company.

Ascension Island has the international calling code +247 and, from 1 June 2015 has five-digit numbers (the old four-digit number prefixed by the digit "6", or "4" for mobile telephones).

=== Banking and currency ===
The Bank of St. Helena has a branch on the island; it holds an account with the UK's Lloyds Bank for the purposes of conducting money transfers with the rest of the world. The currency on Ascension Island is the Saint Helena pound. Tristan da Cunha however uses the pound sterling rather than the Saint Helena pound. The coins of the Saint Helena pound specify that they are for use on both Saint Helena and Ascension Island, but with no mention of Tristan da Cunha, whereas the banknotes only say "Government of St Helena". There are also distinct commemorative coins for Ascension Island. For more information on currency in the wider region, see British currency in the South Atlantic and the Antarctic.

== Education ==
Two Boats School is the only school on the island and provides education to all children aged 3–16.

== Sports ==
The Ascension Island Football League (registered as Ascension Island Championship) is the top division of football on Ascension Island. Three official football competitions organized by the Association are held on the island: the Ascension Island Football League, Knockout Tournament, and the Flipper Trophy.

Ascension Island does not have its own team in the Commonwealth Games, but athletes from Ascension have participated on the Saint Helena Commonwealth Games team in the past, including swimmer Caroline Lawrence in 1982 and marathon runner Errol Duncan in 2006. Athletes from Ascension have also represented Saint Helena at the Island Games.

== Transport ==
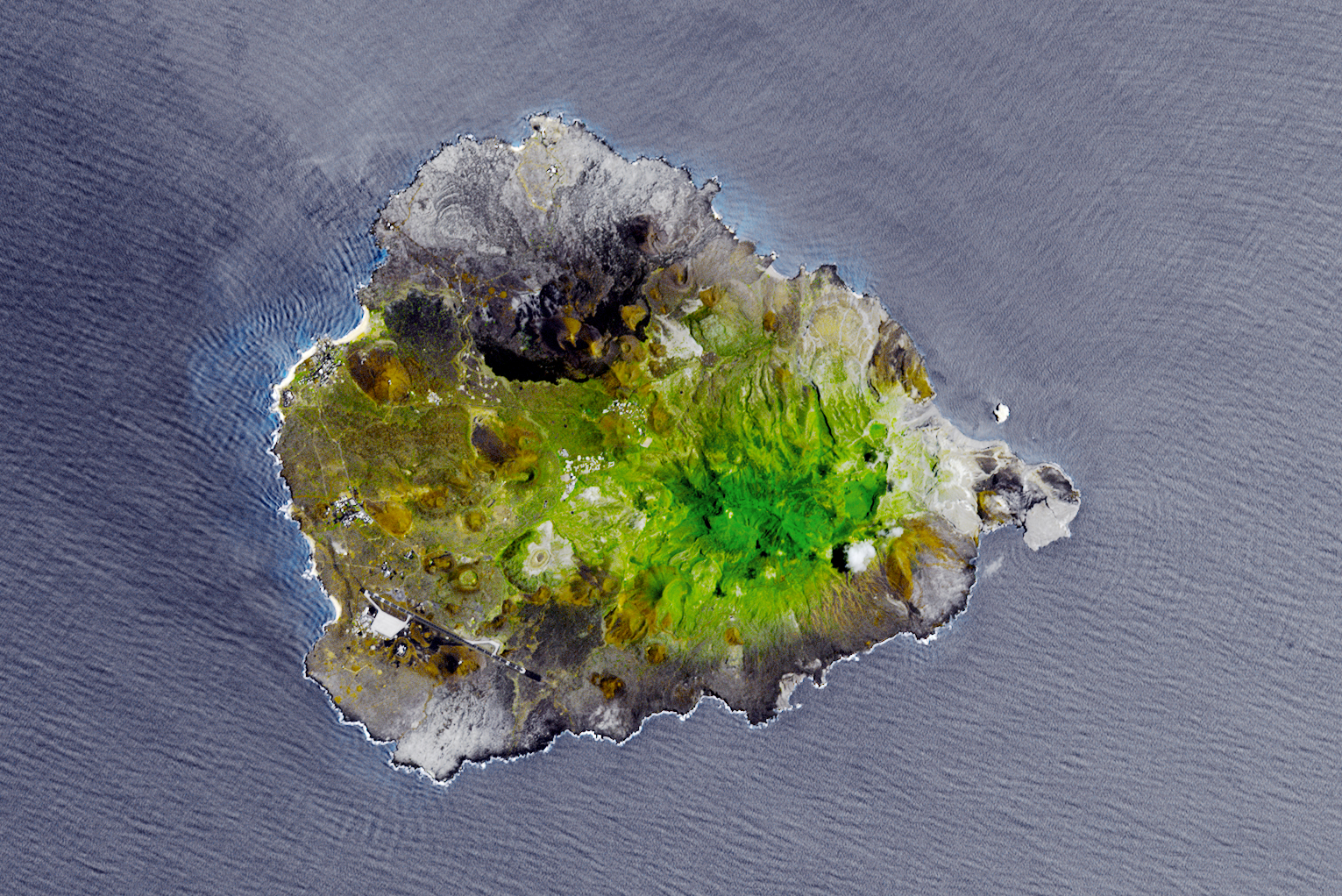
Satellite picture of Ascension Island in 2010

In 2003 the British and US governments signed the Wideawake agreement designed to allow a limited number of non-scheduled civilian aircraft to land on Ascension Island, under responsibility of the British government.

Poor runway conditions at RAF Ascension Island led in April 2017 to the cancellation of twice-weekly flights from there to the UK (RAF Brize Norton) and to the Falkland Islands (RAF Mount Pleasant). An Airbus A330 aircraft operated by AirTanker Services on behalf of the Ministry of Defence (United Kingdom) carried out those flights, called the South Atlantic Air Bridge, although a limited number of commercial passenger tickets were available. Those flights then travelled via Dakar, Senegal. AW Ship Management arranged for civilians to board RAF flights to and from RAF Ascension Island and RAF Brize Norton. Previously AW Ship Management had a package deal where passengers could travel in one direction on the RAF flights and in the other on the RMS St Helena, which travelled between Ascension, Saint Helena, and Cape Town, South Africa until the opening of St Helena Airport to passenger flights.

From 2017, the runway was becoming increasingly unserviceable and a mixture of A400 and C17 planes landed at Ascension every three weeks to supply the RAF operation and deliver mail. A lengthy repair process was initiated in 2020 and while A330s were unable to land at the airport during the repair process, the United States military used Air Transport International Boeing 757 combi aircraft to maintain a twice monthly flight between the island and Patrick Space Force Base in Florida for the use of its personnel only, while the MV Ascension supply ship regularly serviced US facilities.

The repair project celebrated its halfway point in March 2022. In August 2022, the eastern portion of the runway was completed, allowing full flight operations to resume, with a U.S. Air Force C-17 Globemaster III of the 21st Airlift Squadron being the first aircraft of that size to use the improved runway on 31 August 2022. Earlier that month, an RAF A400M aircraft flying from Ascension Island was refuelled for the first time by a Voyager KC.2 aircraft flying out of RAF Mount Pleasant. The repairs to the runway were completed in May 2023.

There is no taxi service on the island and most visitors requiring transport hire a car. There are around 40 kilometres (25 mi) of roads on the island, all hard-surfaced, along with many unsurfaced paths and trails. Some of the road surfacing used was surplus tarmac from a previous airstrip construction operation. Traffic drives on the left.

The cargo vessel MV Helena, under AW Shipping Management, takes a limited number of passengers between Cape Town and St Helena and Ascension on its voyages.

Following the retirement of the RMS St Helena in 2018, the South African airline Airlink has operated an inter-island air service between St Helena and Ascension once a month. This is operated as a charter service extension on the regular Johannesburg to St Helena route with an overnight turnaround on Ascension. As a result of the COVID-19 pandemic and South African government response, the Airlink air service was temporarily suspended in April 2020. During the temporary suspension, Ascension along with its sister island of St Helena, had been intermittently supplied by a Titan Airways charter service originating in the UK. Airlink resumed operations to Ascension Island (as well as St Helena) on the 26 March 2022.

== See also ==
- Outline of Ascension Island
- Index of Ascension Island–related articles
- Lists of islands
- Diocese of St Helena
- Diego Garcia
- Saint Helena
- Tristan da Cunha

== Bibliography ==
- Duff Hart-Davis, Ascension, the story of a South Atlantic island
- Sergio Ghione, Turtle Island, a Journey to Britain's Oddest Colony
- Mitchell, David F. 2010. Ascension Island and the Second World War . Ascension Island: Ascension Island Heritage Society.
- Correspondent's diary: Ascension Island | The Economist
- Official Ascension Island Government site
- "Ascension". Global Volcanism Program. Smithsonian Institution.
- Sanders, Sarah, Important Bird Areas in the United Kingdom Overseas Territories; priority sites for conservation (RSPB, 2006)
- Stonehouse, Bernard. (1960). Wideawake Island. The Story of the BOU Centenary Expedition to Ascension. Hutchinson: London
- Duff Hart-Davis, The Spectator 17 October 2015, "The Stone Frigate Sails On", p. 16.
