= Cat Hill, Ascension Island =

Village on the South Atlantic island

Cat Hill
- Part of NSA-GCHQ Composite Signals Organisation
- Ascension Island
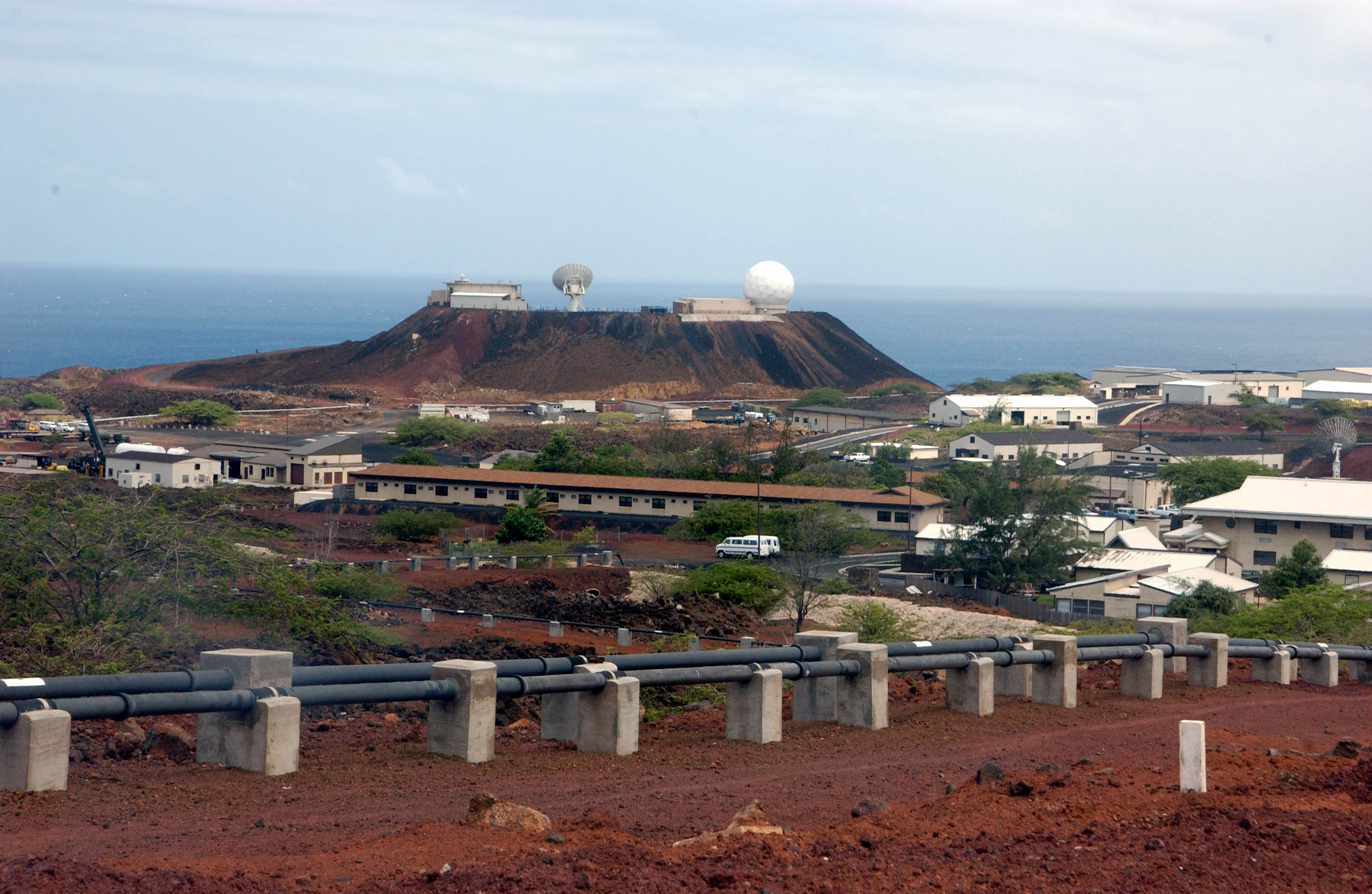
- Cat Hill

Site information
- Type: Satellite ground station
- Owner: Government of the United Kingdom
- Condition: Active

Location
- Coordinates: 7°57′S 14°25′W

Site history
- Built: 1960–1961
- In use: 1961–present

Cat Hill is a settlement on Ascension Island, an island which forms part of the British Overseas Territories.

== History ==
The Target Tracking Radar Station, known as the Golf Ball, was built on this site, designated for use as a base for the United States Armed Forces, between 1960 and 1961. The site subsequently became the location of the joint NSA-GCHQ Composite Signals Organisation facility on the island.

== See also ==
- List of towns in Saint Helena, Ascension and Tristan da Cunha
