= RAF Travellers Hill =

Accommodation village for Royal Air Force personnel on Ascension Island

- military village
- Map showing location of RAF Travellers Hill
- Coordinates: 07°56′40.82″S 14°22′20.73″W
- Sovereign state: United Kingdom
- British Overseas Territory: St Helena, Ascension, and Tristan da Cunha
- Island: Ascension

Area
  - Land: 0.63 sq mi (1.63 km^{2})
- Elevation: 666 ft (203 m)

RAF Travellers Hill, originally known as Travellers Hill Camp, is a small military village of the British Armed Forces, located near Two Boats on Ascension Island, a British Overseas Territory. It was built following the Falklands War to house Royal Air Force (RAF) personnel working on RAF Ascension Island, opening in December 1983. In addition to residential accommodation, RAF Travellers Hill also contains a NAAFI club complex (consisting of a general provisions store, licensed bar, and 'sticky bun' eatery), cinema, and outdoor swimming pool (one of only two on the island).
