= Two Boats, Ascension Island =

Village on Ascension Island, United Kingdom

Two Boats
- Village
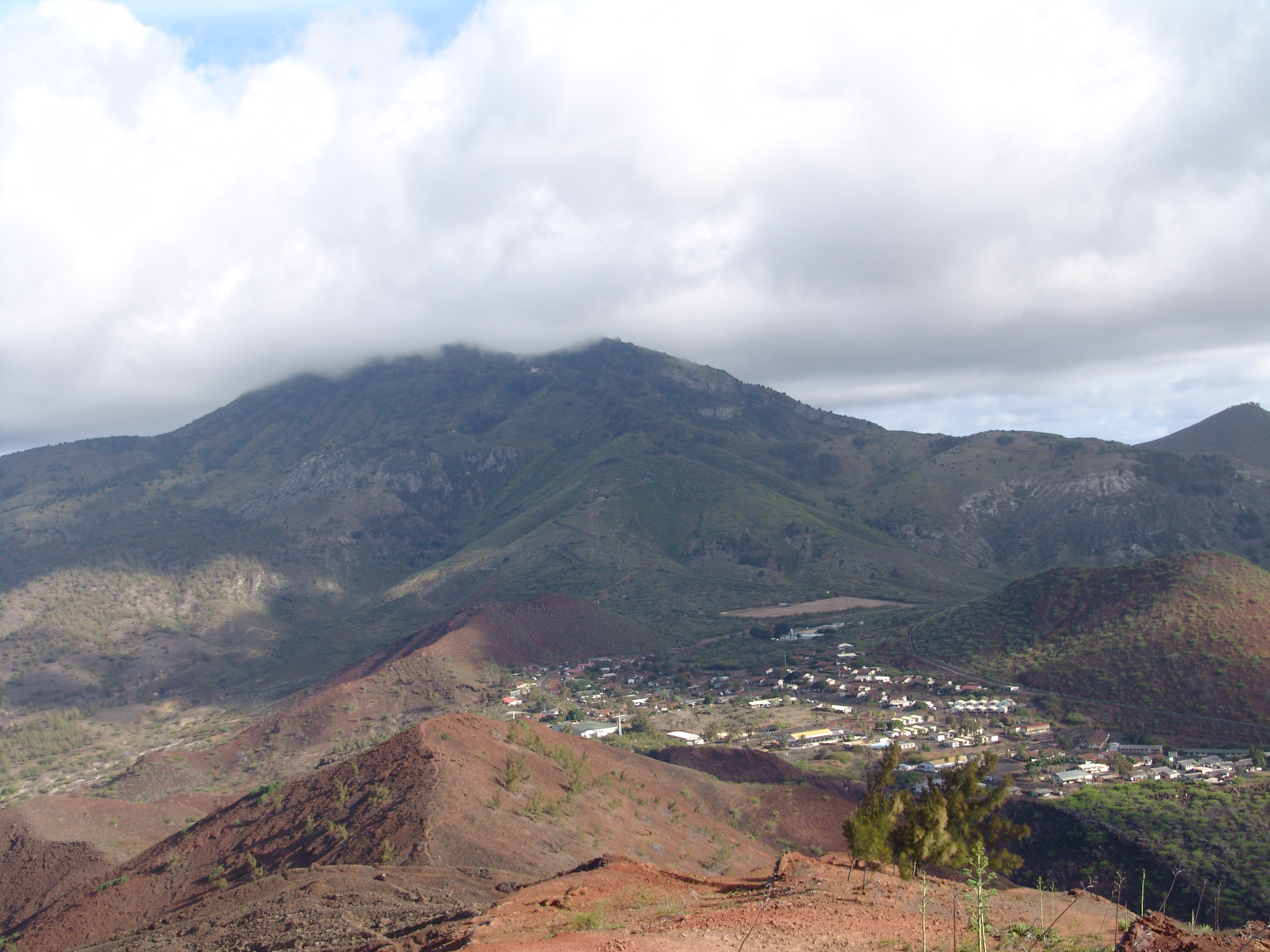
- View of Two Boats from the peak of Two Sisters
- Interactive map of Two Boats
- Coordinates: 7.937°S 14.364°W
- Country: United Kingdom
- British overseas territory: Saint Helena, Ascension and Tristan da Cunha
- Island: Ascension
- Time zone: UTC+0 (GMT)
- Climate: BWh

Two Boats, also known as Two Boats Village, is a village at the foot of Green Mountain on Ascension Island. Founded in the early 19th century, it was originally a resting point for sailors who sought to ascend the mountain. Before the village's establishment, two boats had been stuck in the area, perpendicular to the ground to provide shade for passersby, giving the new settlement the inspiration for its name. It has the island's only school, Two Boats School.

== Geography ==
Two Boats is located at the foot of Green Mountain, the highest point of Ascension Island. It is one of five settlements on the island.

There exists a modern legend about a lizard-shaped rock on top of a pile of rocks on the road between Two Boats and Georgetown. Local superstition dictates that visitors to Ascension Island must paint the lizard-shaped rock before they leave the island if they do not intend to return. Those who return to Ascension Island after painting the rock are said to be fated to die. While most visitors merely pour paint over the rock, in the early days of the legend observers would carefully and earnestly paint the rock.

== History ==
Two Boats was built years after the construction of the island's first village and capital, Georgetown, in 1815. The area was originally a resting point and water stop for sailors attempting to hike up Green Mountain. Two twenty-foot longboats were stuck to the ground by their ends, with seats perpendicular to the boats and parallel to the ground to provide shade and a place to sit and rest. The village was thus named Two Boats, with the name Two Boats Village being occasionally used to avoid confusion.

== Education ==
Two Boats School is the only school on Ascension Island. In 2022, it had 60 pupils aged 4 to 17 years old. It is twinned with St Margaret's Primary Academy in Lowestoft, England, some 7,000 kilometres away.

== See also ==
- RAF Travellers Hill
