= Two Boats School =

School on Ascension Island

Coordinates: 7°56′4″S 14°21′57″W

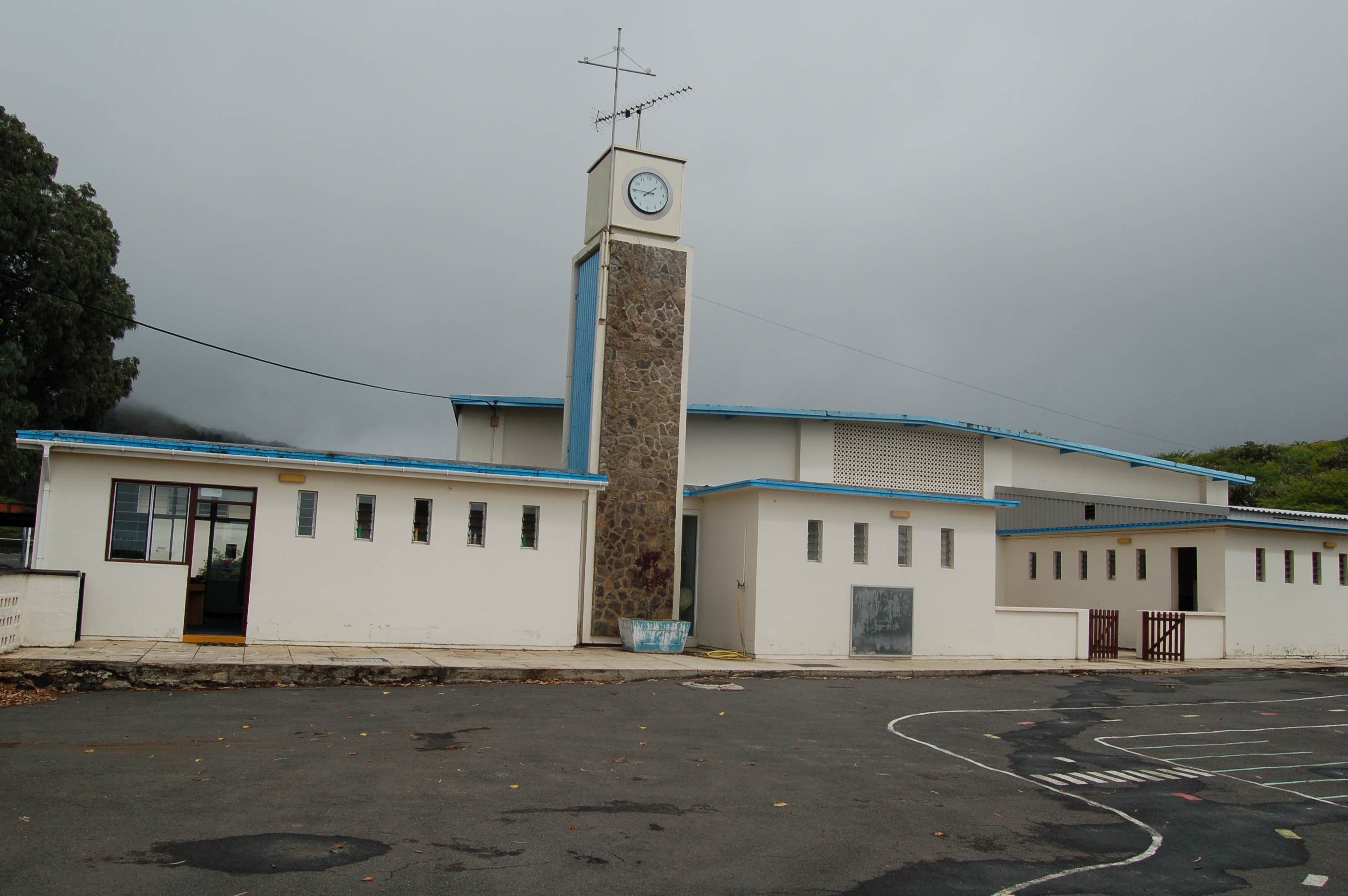
Two Boats School

Two Boats School is the only school on Ascension Island, located in Two Boats Village. It is part of the Ascension Island Government (AIG) and provides education to all children living on the island from Foundation Stage to Year 11. There are currently 100 children and 21 staff.

== Outline ==
The school follows the National Curriculum for England. Although geographically in the Southern Hemisphere, the school follows a Northern Hemisphere term pattern with the main holidays split between Christmas and August. Students complete end of Key Stage tests as in the UK (excluding Scotland) and sit IGCSE or GCSE examinations in Year 10 and 11. The last school inspection in November 2014, carried out by the School Inspection Service, one of the contractors licensed to conduct inspections under the Ofsted-accredited regime for British Schools Overseas, found the school's provision to be good with many excellent features. Examination results compare very favourably with UK schools. Once students have finished their GCSE courses, they can attend college in the UK, Sixth Form on St Helena, or can enter training programmes with one of the employing organisations on the island.

Most of the co-curricular activities are run by the youth groups on the island, including all sections of the Girl Guide and Scout movements. Participation rates are very high. Other activities include Twirling, Craft, and Chess Club.

The school is housed in a purpose-built campus in Two Boats Village at the base of Green Mountain.

Farah Quinn became headteacher of Two Boats School in March 2020. The School Governors Committee provides a link with the community and advises on policy.
