= Keith Best =

British politician

Member of Parliament for Ynys Môn Anglesey (1979 - 1983)
- In office 3 May 1979 – 18 May 1987
- Preceded by: Cledwyn Hughes
- Succeeded by: Ieuan Wyn Jones

Personal details
- Born: Keith Lander Best; 10 June 1949 (age 76)
- Party: Conservative
- Spouse: Elizabeth Gibson

Keith Lander Best (born 10 June 1949) is a former Conservative Party politician in the United Kingdom. He was Member of Parliament (MP) for Anglesey from 1979 when he gained the seat from Labour until 1983, and for the renamed Ynys Môn from 1983 to 1987. He was Parliamentary Private Secretary to the Secretary of State for Wales from 1981 to 1984. He was described by Austin Mitchell in 1982 as one of 12 MPs who “are the parliamentary activists, the people who keep the place going. Compared to their efforts, a much larger number of MPs either do a lot less or direct their activity into less public channels.”

He resigned his seat in 1987 following the revelation by the Labour Research Department that he had made multiple share applications in the BT offer (for which he was later imprisoned). He has since led the organisations Prisoners Abroad (1989–1993), the Immigration Advisory Service (1993–2009), Freedom from Torture (2010–2014) and SurvivorsUK (2015-2018). He is currently the President of Stop Human Trafficking Worldwide.

== Biography ==
Keith Best was born in Brighton, and was educated at Brighton College and Keble College, Oxford, before becoming a barrister in 1973. He served in the Territorial Army Royal Horse Artillery 289 Para Bty and Royal Artillery in airborne and commando forces and as a Naval Gunfire Support Liaison Officer 1967–89, reaching the rank of Major, awarded the Territorial Decoration (TD) and as a Brighton Borough councillor 1976–80. He is a founder member of the Tory Reform Group.

During his time in Parliament he served on the Welsh Affairs Select Committee, was an officer of the Parliamentary Group for World Government and was the Chair of the International Council of Parliamentarians Global Action. After his election to Parliament Best was driving when his car was involved in an accident resulting in the death of his personal assistant; he was cleared of responsibility.

During the privatisation of British Telecom, individuals were limited to a single allocation of shares. Best submitted several applications by using minor variations of his name. On 30 September 1987, he was sentenced to four months' imprisonment for this deception and was fined £3,000. On 5 October 1987, the Court of Appeal ruled that his jail sentence was too harsh, and Best was released but his fine was increased to £4,500.

In 1987 his successor as MP for Ynys Mon was Plaid Cymru candidate Ieuan Wyn Jones. In 2000 Best failed in a bid for reselection by the Conservative Party in Ynys Môn.

In 1987 he became the Chairman of the Executive Committee of the World Federalist Movement, but he transitioned to the Secretary role in 2018. He is the former Chair of Parliamentarians Global Action. He was Director of Prisoners Abroad 1989–93. He was Chief Executive of the Immigration Advisory Service 1993–2009. He was Chairman of the Council of the Electoral Reform Society 1998–2003 and served on its Council for fifteen years. He was Chairman of Electoral Reform International Services Ltd 2004–14. He is Chairman of Conservative Action for Electoral Reform. In 2003, he was named by The Guardian as one of the 100 most influential people in public services in the UK.

In April 2010 he took up the post of Chief Executive of Freedom from Torture (formerly Medical Foundation for the Care of Victims of Torture), where he remained until 2014. He was then appointed the first Chief Executive of SurvivorsUK which he left in April 2017 in order to undertake consultancy and more charity work.

He is currently:

- Chair of the Universal Peace Federation (UK) Board of Trustees
- President of Stop Human Trafficking Worldwide
- Secretary of the Parliamentary Outreach Trust (formerly Secretary of the European Movement)
- Chairman of Conservative Action for Electoral Reform
- Secretary of the PCC and American Friends of St James's Church, Piccadilly, London
- Appointed to the Board of ARHAG Housing Association
- Chair of the Wyndham Place Charlemagne Trust charity
- Chair of the St Nazaire Raid Memorial Trust
- Clerk to United Charities of St James’s
- Clerk to Wren Project

He also lectures to various American universities.

He is married to Elizabeth Gibson, former Chief Executive of the charity the Evelina Family Trust and Office Manager of British Future; and they have two daughters. When his wife stood as the Conservative candidate for Birmingham Hodge Hill at the 1992 general election, Best acted as her election agent.

In 2017, Best became one of the founding members of Citizens for Britain. He is the author of Write Your Own Will 1978, The Right Way to Prove a Will, 1981 and of various articles in magazines, Wall Street Journal, newspapers etc. Former Deputy Editor District Council Review. He contributed a chapter to the 2021 book Religious Soft Diplomacy and the United Nations: Religious Engagement as Loyal Opposition.

In 2022 and 2026 both Keith Best and his wife, Elizabeth Gibson, stood for Oval ward in the 2022 Lambeth London Borough Council election.

== Bibliography ==
- Times Guide to the House of Commons, 1987
- Chronicle of the 20th Century
- Keith Best papers National Library of Wales
- All articles by Keith Best in The Guardian

Parliament of the United Kingdom
Preceded by Cledwyn Hughes	Member of Parliament for Ynys Môn; 1979–1987	Succeeded by Ieuan Wyn Jones
