= Disgwylfa Chapel =

Former chapel in Holyhead, Anglesey, Wales

Coordinates: 53.3044°N 4.6268°W

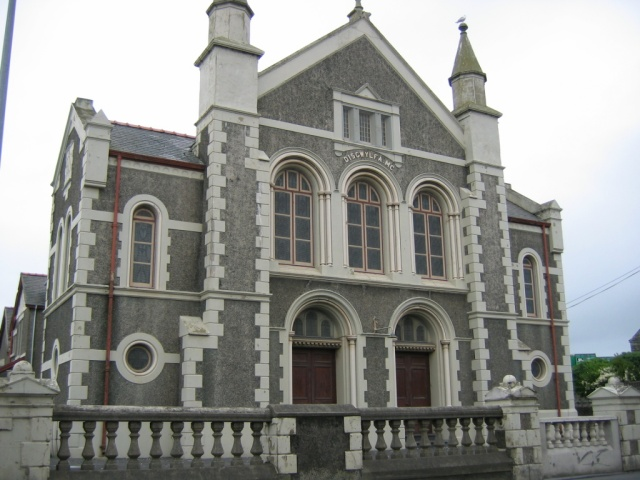
Disgwylfa Chapel

Capel Disgwylfa was a Calvinistic Methodist chapel in London Road, Holyhead, Anglesey. It was built in 1881, rebuilt in 1889 and rebuilt again in 1909. The building of 1909 was in the Romanesque style with a gable-entry plan and flanking turrets.

Henry David Hughes was the minister of Disgwylfa from 1915 until his death in 1947. Widely known as Harri Hughes, he had left school at the age of twelve to work in the Dinorwic quarry, as several generations of his family had done. At the age of twenty-one he resumed his education and entered the ministry. His son, Cledwyn Hughes, was the MP for Anglesey from 1951 until 1979 and was also a deacon at Disgwylfa.

The chapel was demolished in 2009.
