= RAF Ascension Island =

Royal Air Force station in the Atlantic Ocean

RAF Ascension Island
- Wideawake Airfield; Ascension Island Auxiliary Field
- Near Georgetown in Saint Helena, Ascension and Tristan da Cunha
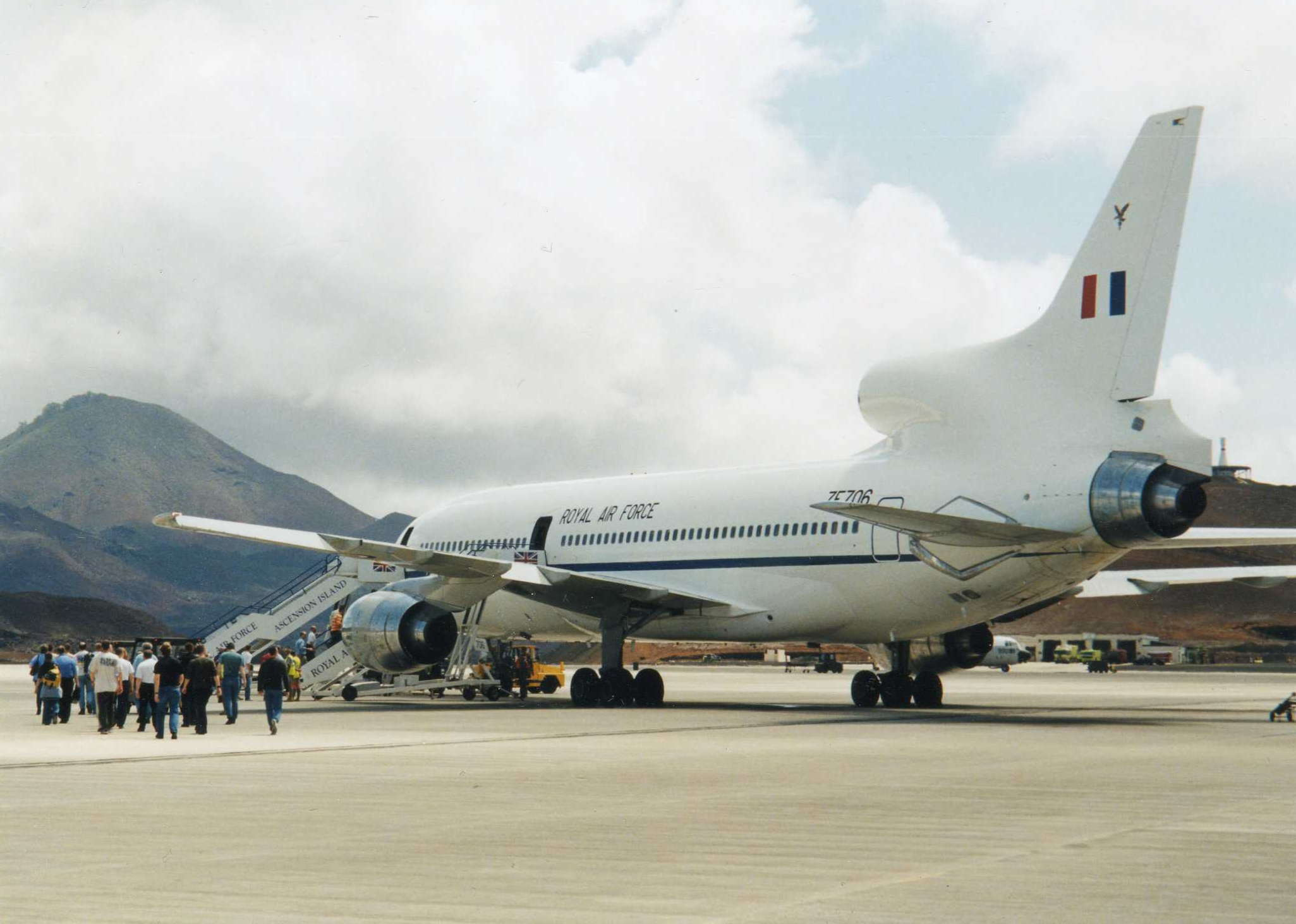
- A Royal Air Force TriStar at RAF Ascension Island in 2001

- Auxilium trans mare (Latin for 'Support across the Sea')

Site information
- Type: Permanent Joint Operating Base
- Owner: Ministry of Defence
- Operator: Royal Air Force and US Space Force
- Controlled by: British Forces South Atlantic Islands
- Condition: Operational
- Website: Official website

Location
- Location on Ascension Island RAF Ascension Island (South Atlantic) RAF Ascension Island (Atlantic Ocean)
- Coordinates: 07°58′10″S 014°23′38″W
- Area: 55 hectares (135.9 acres)

Site history
- Built: 1939
- In use: 1939–present

Garrison information
- Current commander: Wing Commander Alan Huyton

Airfield information
- Identifiers: IATA: ASI, ICAO: FHAW, WMO: 61902
- Elevation: 78.6 metres (258 ft) AMSL
Runways
Direction	Length and surface
13/31	3,054 metres (10,020 ft) Asphalt
- Source: UK MIL AIP – FHAW Ascension / Wideawake

RAF Ascension Island (IATA: ASI, ICAO: FHAW), also known as Wideawake Airfield or Ascension Island Auxiliary Field, is a military airfield and facility located on Ascension Island in the Atlantic Ocean. The airfield is jointly operated by the Royal Air Force (RAF) and the United States Space Force (USSF). Under the terms of an international agreement between the UK and US governments, only state aircraft (e.g. military and diplomatic flights) are authorised to land at Ascension, with the exception being civil aviation between Ascension and Saint Helena.

The facility is home to a U.S. Space Force ground tracking station in support of the Eastern Range and rocket launches from Cape Canaveral Space Force Station in Florida.

== History ==
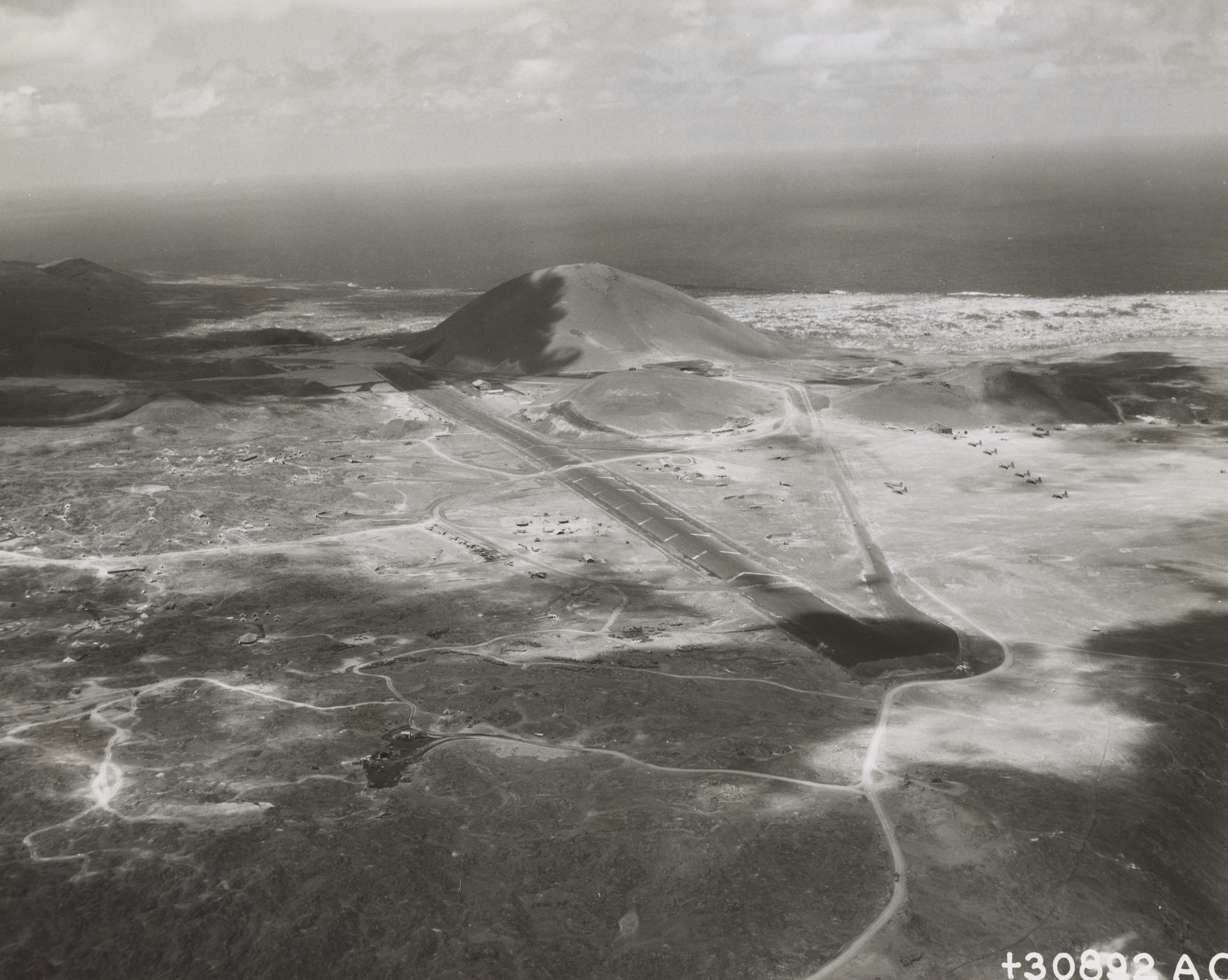
Wideawake Field in the 1940s

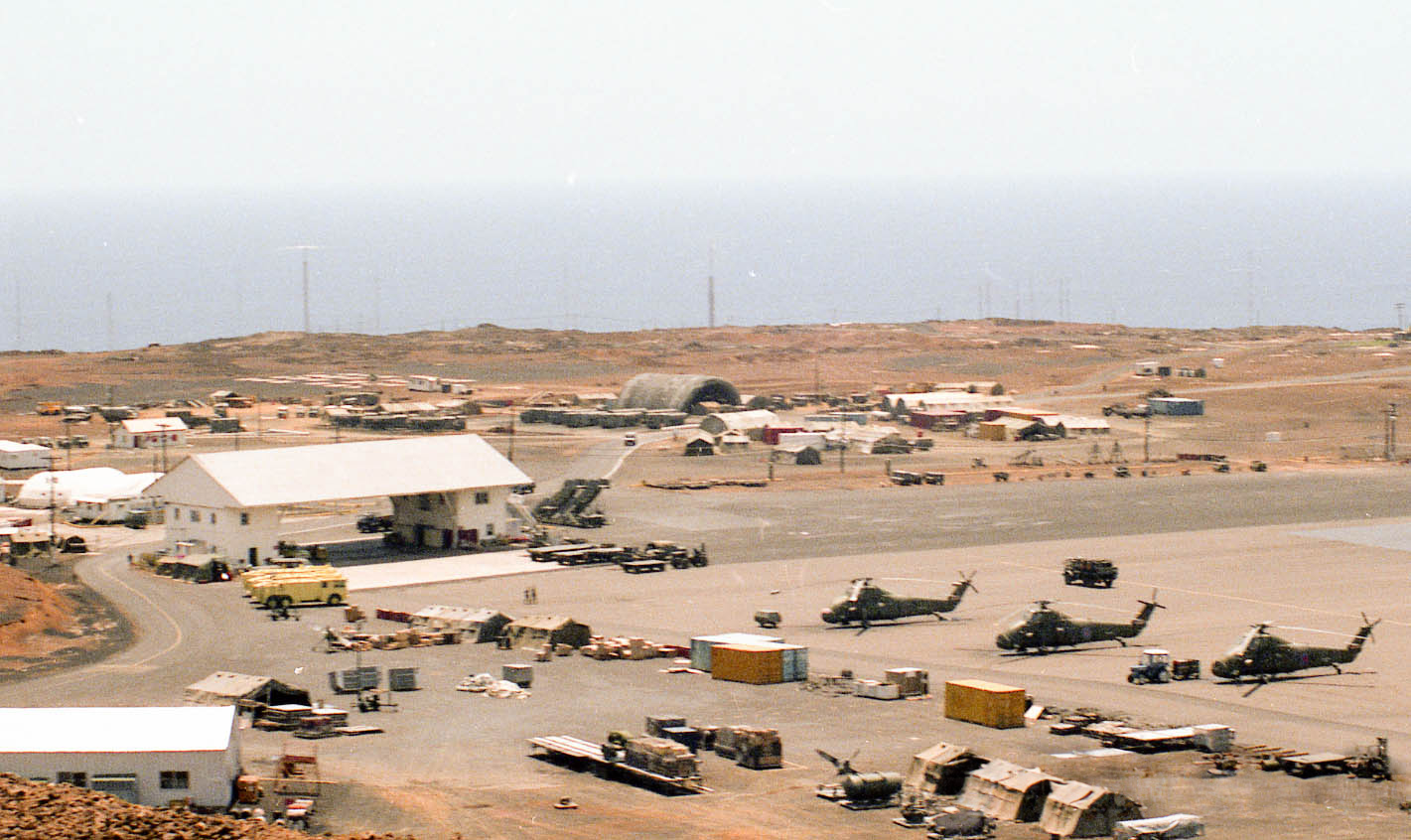
Air station in November 1983

In 1939 Ascension became important as a high-frequency direction finding radio station covering trade routes. Wideawake Airfield (named after a noisy colony of sooty terns nearby) was built by the US military in 1942 by arrangement with the British government. The work was done by a US task force of the USAAF 38th Engineer Combat Regiment and the airfield opened on 10 July 1942. The first aircraft to land on Ascension Island was a Fairey Swordfish from HMS Archer in June 1942, and it went on to be used by more than 25,000 aircraft as a staging point during the Second World War. An unusual visitor was a captured German Junkers Ju 88 bomber, which landed there in October 1943 as it was being flown from the Middle East to the United States in stages.

A U.S. Air Force tracking station (now administered by the U.S. Space Force) was activated as a satellite of Patrick Air Force Base (now Patrick Space Force Base) in Florida on 25 June 1956.

The airfield's runway was extended in the latter part of 1980. The base was re-garrisoned by the RAF in 1982 and used extensively as a staging airfield, for the Avro Vulcan bombers and the Handley Page Victor tankers, during the Falklands War. A series of long-range bombing raids was carried out from there under the name Operation Black Buck. The first mission was on 30 April 1982. At one stage during that conflict, Wideawake became the busiest airport in the world for the number of aircraft movements.

In 2017 a parliamentary answer disclosed the runway needed a 'full depth resurfacing'. In June 2020 the U.S. Department of Defense announced the runway would be repaired, with a completion date in 2022 after eighteen months work; until then commercial flights were suspended. Normal flights were able to resume in August/September 2022 when repairs to the eastern side of the runway were completed (see further discussion below).

The USAF relies upon contractors to maintain the airfield facilities and the satellite station. An update is underway, with a completion date in 2025.

== Target Tracking Radar Station ==
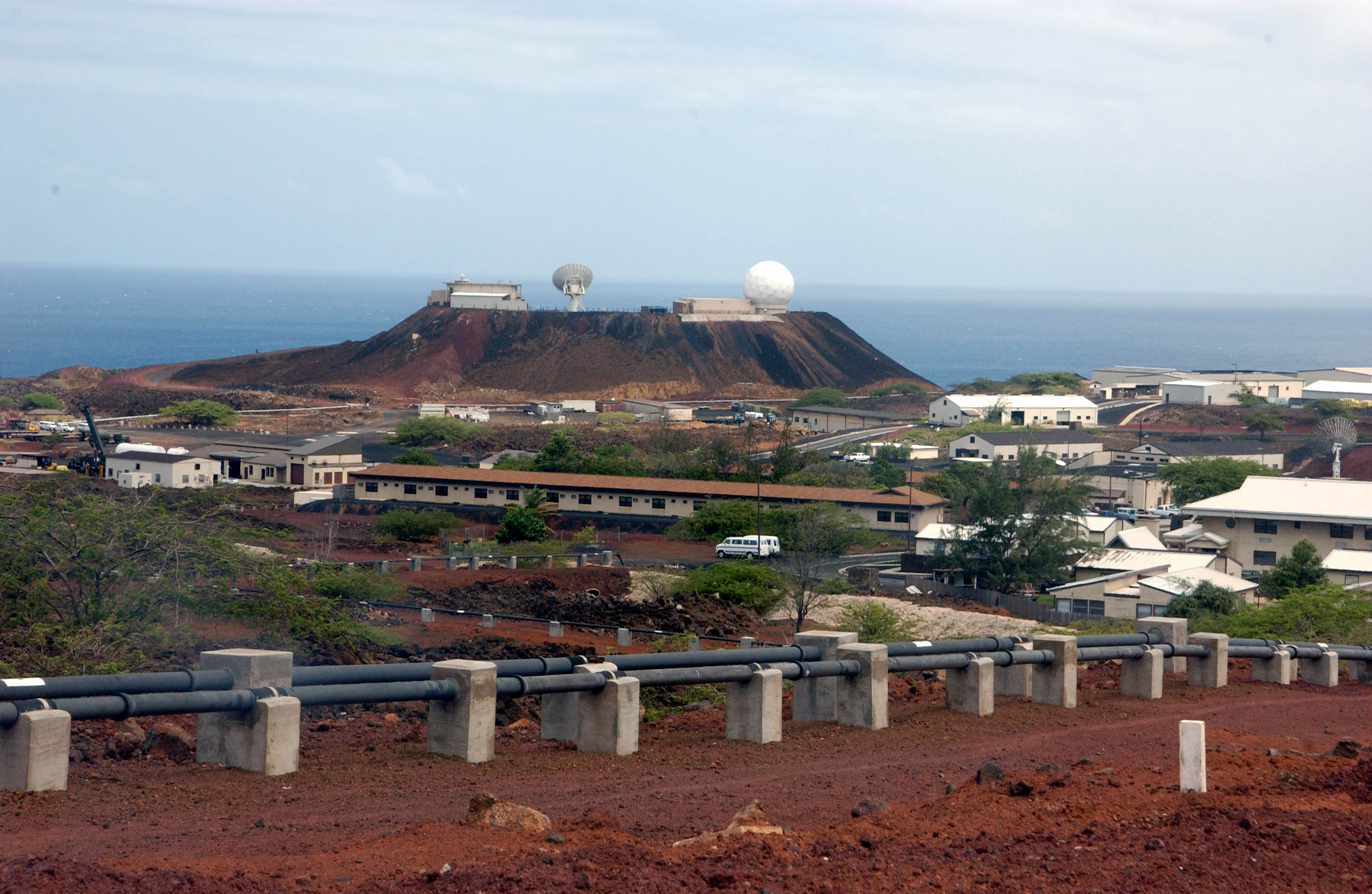
U.S. Space Force tracking station at Cat Hill, which has been truncated to add radar facilities

The Target Tracking Radar Station was a Nike Zeus test facility for tracking reentry vehicles from Cape Canaveral missile launches. Built from 1960-1961 for anti-ballistic missile measurement, the "Golf Ball" radar antenna was on Cat Hill, and a collimation tower for radar calibration was towards English Bay. The facility is home to the Detachment 2 of the 45th Mission Support Group, part of the U.S. Space Force's Delta 45. It operates a ground tracking station in support of the Eastern Range and rocket launches from Cape Canaveral Space Force Station in Florida.

The NASA Tracking Station at Devil's Ashpit and the Cable & Wireless Earth Station at Donkey Plain were built in the mid-1960s for space operations and communications, including the latter's use for transmitting "microwave borne data via the Early Bird Satellite back to the NASA facility at Andover, Maine".

== Operations ==
The station comes under the overall jurisdiction of the Commander British Forces South Atlantic Islands, an officer of one-star rank. As of December 2018, the incumbent is Commodore Jonathan Lett.

The RAF airfield on Ascension Island is run on a day-to-day basis by around 19 RAF personnel, headed by a wing commander.

RAF Ascension Island is normally the refuelling point for the Ministry of Defence's South Atlantic air bridge flights to RAF Mount Pleasant, on the Falkland Islands, from RAF Brize Norton in Oxfordshire, in the UK.

Beginning in November 2017, the Ascension Island Government has contracted South African air carrier Airlink to conduct regularly scheduled charter flights between Saint Helena Airport and Ascension Island on a monthly basis. Flights are currently scheduled on the second week of every month, arriving at Ascension on Saturday afternoon and returning to Saint Helena on Sunday morning. The first of these flights were scheduled for 18 and 19 November 2017. Additionally civilian passengers had been permitted on flights to and from RAF Brize Norton with reservations handled by AW Ship Management, with some customers doing package deals combined with the RMS Saint Helena, which travelled between Saint Helena and Cape Town, South Africa until the opening of St Helena Airport to passenger flights.

The site is home to a high frequency radio station forming part of the Defence High Frequency Communications Service. The station is operated by Babcock International Group on behalf of the Ministry of Defence.

== Incidents ==
- On January 2013, a Delta Air Lines Boeing 777-200LR en route from Johannesburg to Atlanta diverted to Ascension as a result of engine problems.

== Suspension of operations and runway repair ==
Potholes on the runway led to the suspension in April 2017 of all Ministry of Defence South Atlantic Air Bridge Flights between RAF Mount Pleasant and RAF Brize Norton until at least 2019/2020. An Airbus A330 aircraft operated by AirTanker Services on behalf of the Ministry of Defence (United Kingdom) carried out those flights although a limited number of commercial passenger tickets were available. Those flights traveled via Dakar. Planes for emergency medical evacuation flights and the newly established monthly charter flight to Saint Helena Airport were not impacted given the size of aircraft used. Essential personnel and equipment were also exempt from the suspension. In February 2021, an RAF A400M aircraft delivered Covid-19 vaccines to the island.

While A330s were unable to land at the airport until the repair reached a stage to permit the resumption of full flight operations, the United States military continued to maintain a weekly flight between the island and Patrick Space Force Base in Florida, only for the use of its personnel, while the MV Ascension supply ship regularly services US facilities.

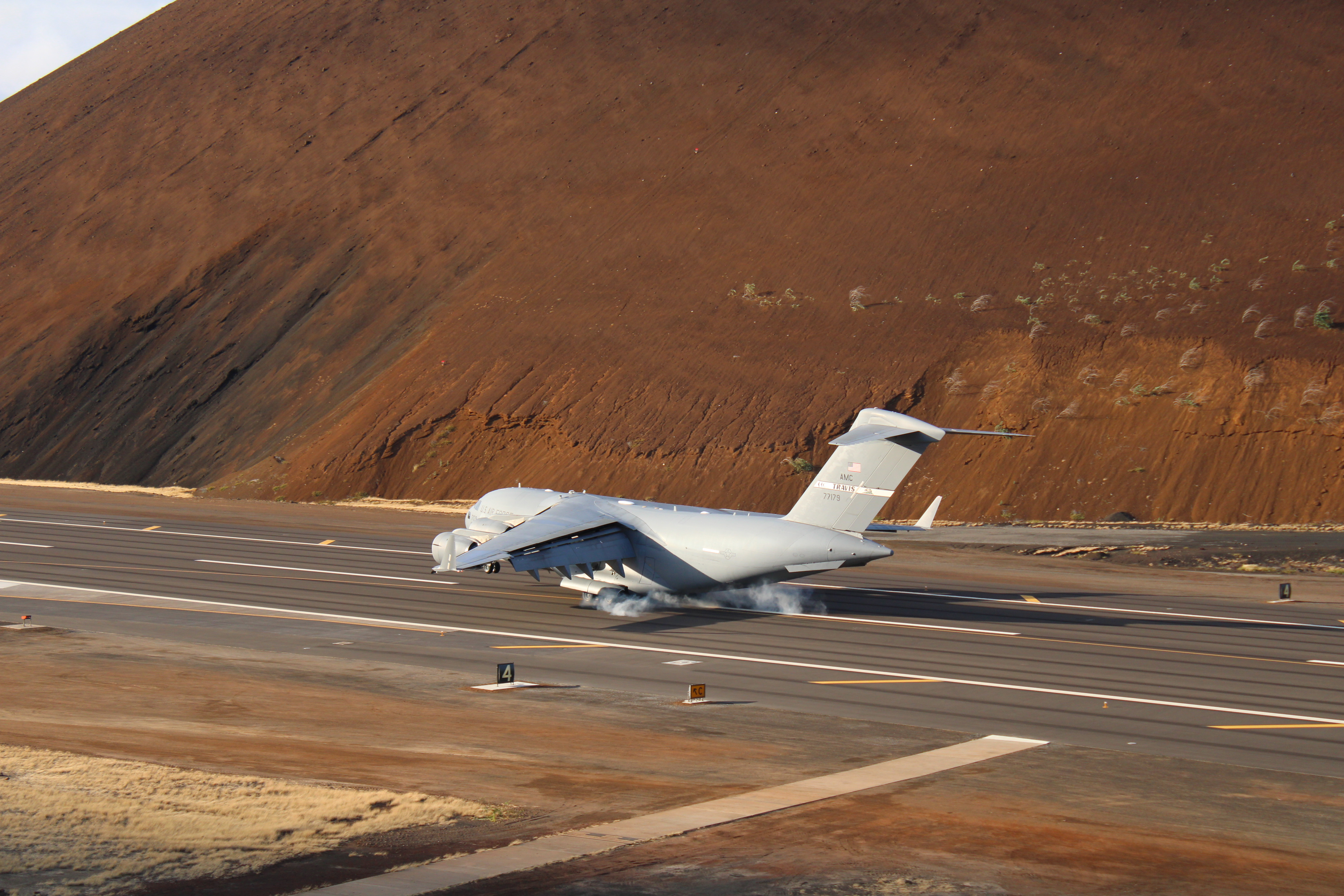
A C-17 lands on the restored eastern portion of the runway, 31 August 2022.

A repair project aimed at restoring service to the airport celebrated its halfway point in March 2022. In August 2022, the eastern portion of the runway was completed, allowing full flight operations to resume, with a U.S. Air Force C-17 Globemaster III of the 21st Airlift Squadron being the first aircraft of that size to use the improved runway on 31 August 2022. Earlier that month, an RAF A400M aircraft flying from Ascension Island was refueled for the first time by a Voyager KC.2 aircraft flying out of RAF Mount Pleasant. The repairs to the western side of the runway were fully completed in April 2023.

== Based units ==
Units based at Ascension Island:

=== Strategic Command ===
  - Director of Overseas Bases
  - British Forces South Atlantic Islands
    - RAF Ascension Island

=== United States Space Force ===
  - Combat Forces Command (USSF CFC)
    - Space Launch Delta 45
      - 45th Mission Support Group
        - Detachment 2

== See also ==
- Saint Helena Airport
- List of Royal Air Force stations
