= Longwood, Saint Helena =

District of Saint Helena

Coordinates: 15°56′S 5°40′W

Longwood
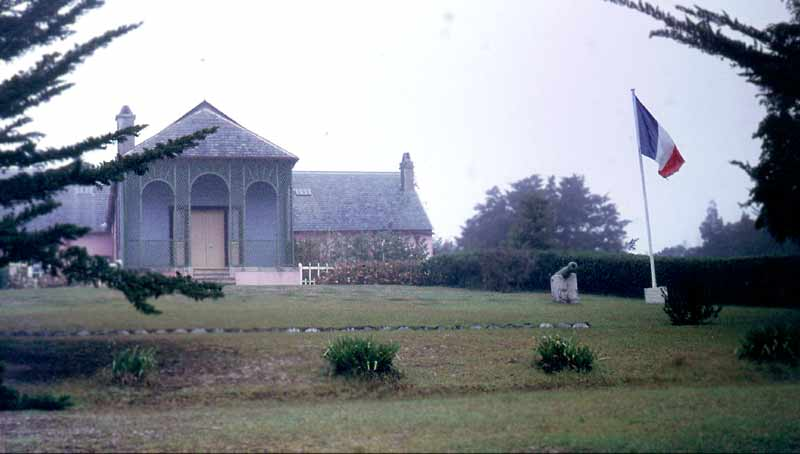
- Longwood House in Longwood in June 1970

- Longwood in Saint Helena
- Sovereign state: United Kingdom
- British overseas territory: Saint Helena, Ascension and Tristan da Cunha
- Island: Saint Helena
- Status: District

Area
  - Total: 12.9 sq mi (33.4 km^{2})

Population (2021)
  - Total: 765 (district)
  - Density: 55/sq mi (21.4/km^{2})
- Time zone: UTC+0 (GMT)

Longwood is a settlement and district of the British island of Saint Helena in the South Atlantic Ocean.

== Description ==
Longwood had a population of 765 in 2021, a decrease of 195 residents when compared with a population of 960 recorded in 1998. The area of the district is 33.4 square kilometres (12.9 sq mi). The district is second only in size to Blue Hill, and includes the settlement of Hutt's Gate, with its St Matthew's church. The district also contains the island's only golf course.

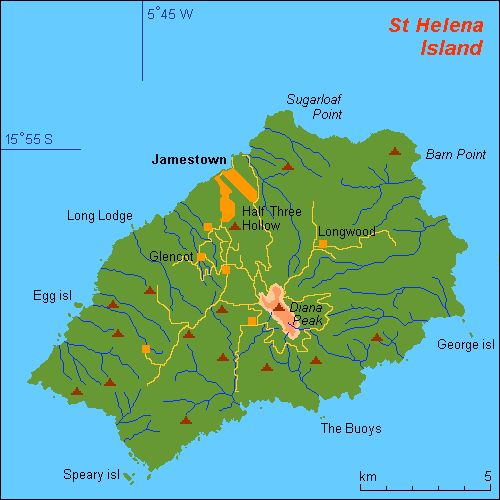
Map showing Longwood's location

The district contains Prosperous Bay Plain, which is where Saint Helena Airport and the Millennium Forest is located.

There is a weather recording station in the Longwood district. Readings of temperature, air pressure and visibility are automatically taken and communicated hourly.

== History ==
=== Observatories ===
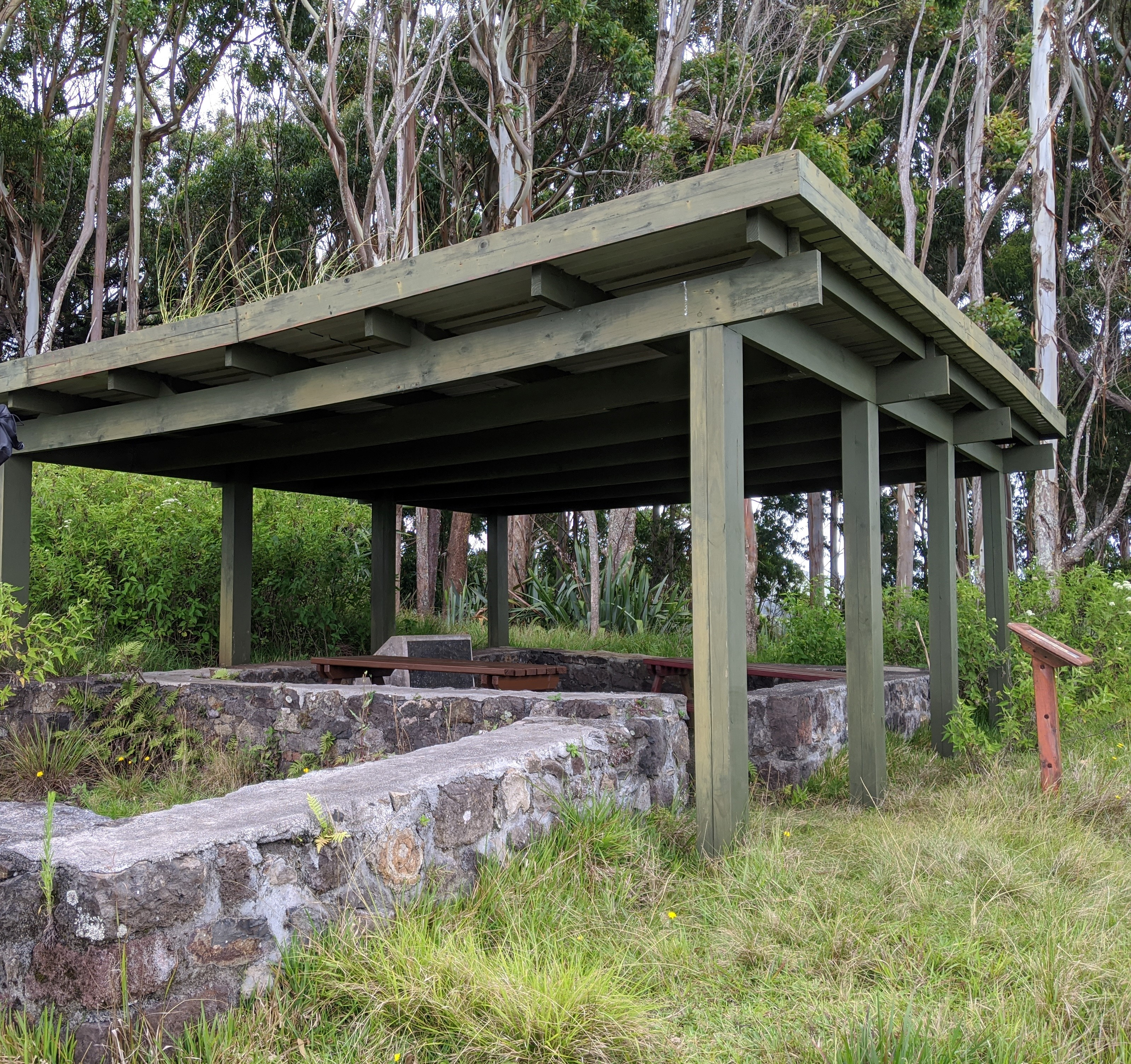
Site of Halley's Observatory in 2020

On leaving the University of Oxford, in 1676, Edmond Halley visited Saint Helena and set up an observatory with a 24-foot-long (7.3 m) aerial telescope with the intention of studying stars from the Southern Hemisphere. The site of this telescope is near St Matthew's church in the district. The 2,230-foot-high (680 m) hill there is named for him and is called Halley's Mount.

Halley's Observatory was in use from 1677–1678. Having returned to England in 1678, Halley published Catalogus Stellarum Australium in 1679, which included details of 341 southern stars. These additions to present-day star maps earned him comparison to Tycho Brahe. Halley was subsequently awarded his Master's from Oxford and Fellowship of the Royal Society.

In 1686, Halley published the second part of the results from his Helenian expedition, being a paper and chart on trade winds and monsoons. In this, he identified solar heating as the cause of atmospheric motions. He also established the relationship between barometric pressure and height above sea level. His charts were an important contribution to the emerging field of information visualisation.

Future Astronomer Royal Nevil Maskelyne visited Saint Helena in 1761 to observe a transit of Venus and built an observatory near the site of Halley's from the previous century. In the 19th/early 20th centuries, an observatory (in use 1840–1849) was situated in Longwood village and two further observatories were erected in the Hutt's Gate area: one in use from 1892–1924 and the second in use from 1925–1975.

=== Napoleon ===
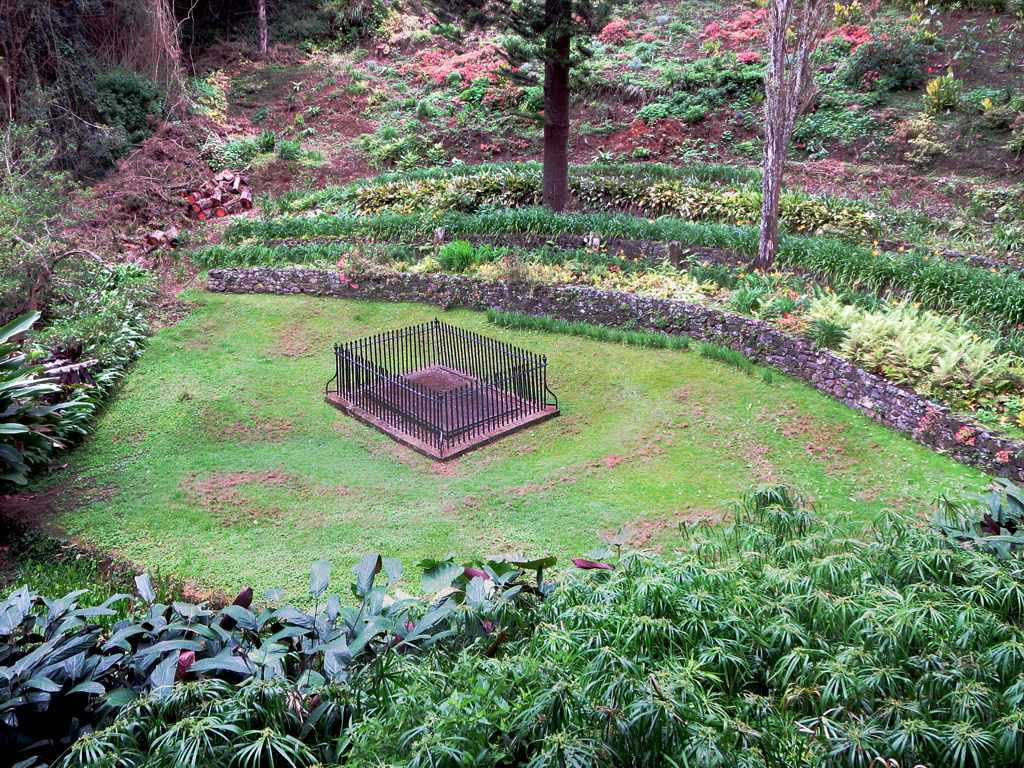
Napoleon's Grave

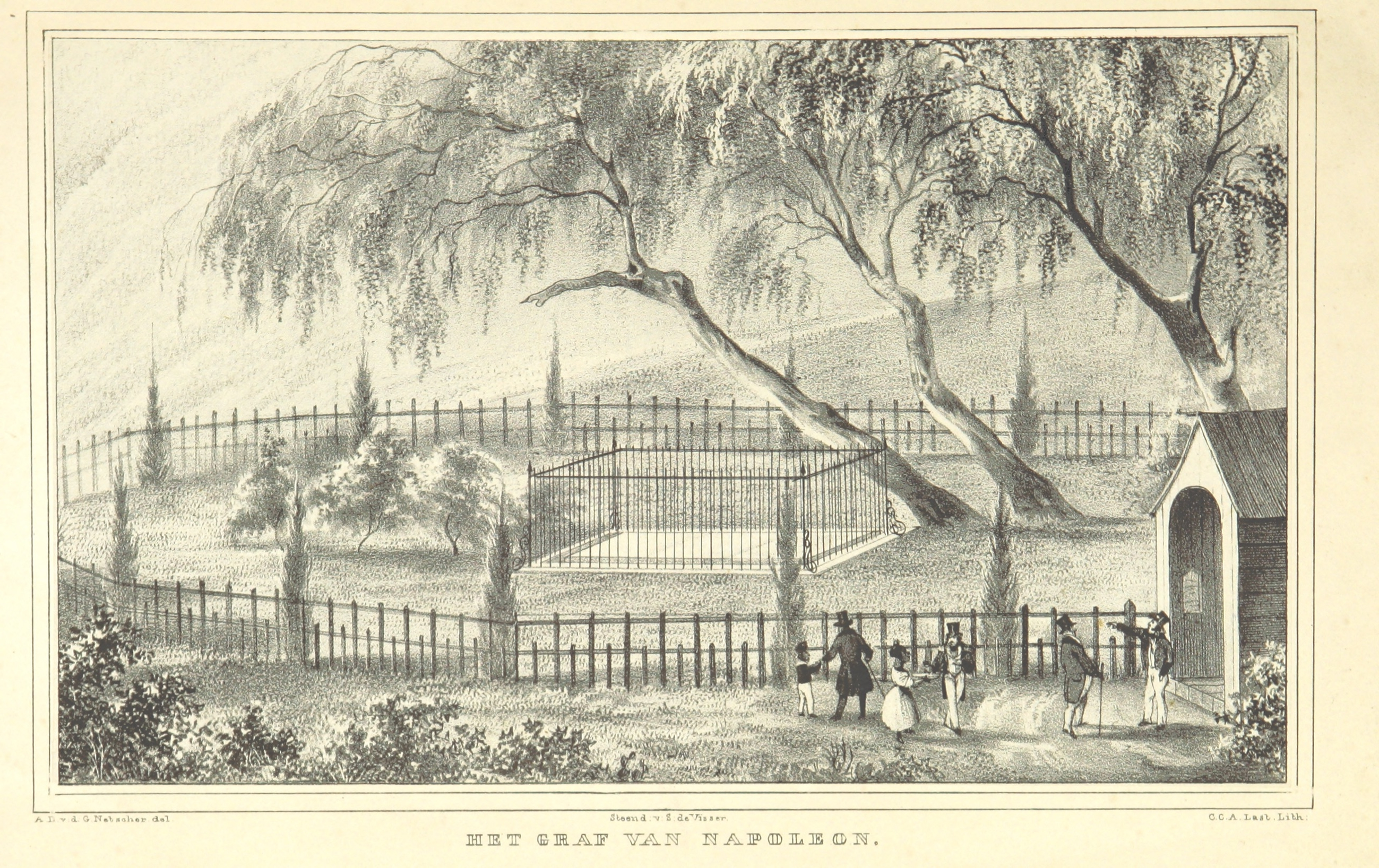
Napoleon's Grave (1838)

Longwood was the location of Napoleon's second exile, from 1815 until his death on 5 May 1821. The French Government, via the Ministry for Europe and Foreign Affairs owns Briars Pavilion, Napoleon's initial exile residence, Longwood House and its properties, where he lived during most of his time on the island, and his original grave, but the United Kingdom retains sovereignty over these properties.

Napoleon's main physician, Barry O'Meara, wrote letters describing the issues of Napoleon and his entourage while in captivity, and sent them clandestinely to a friend at the Admiralty in London.

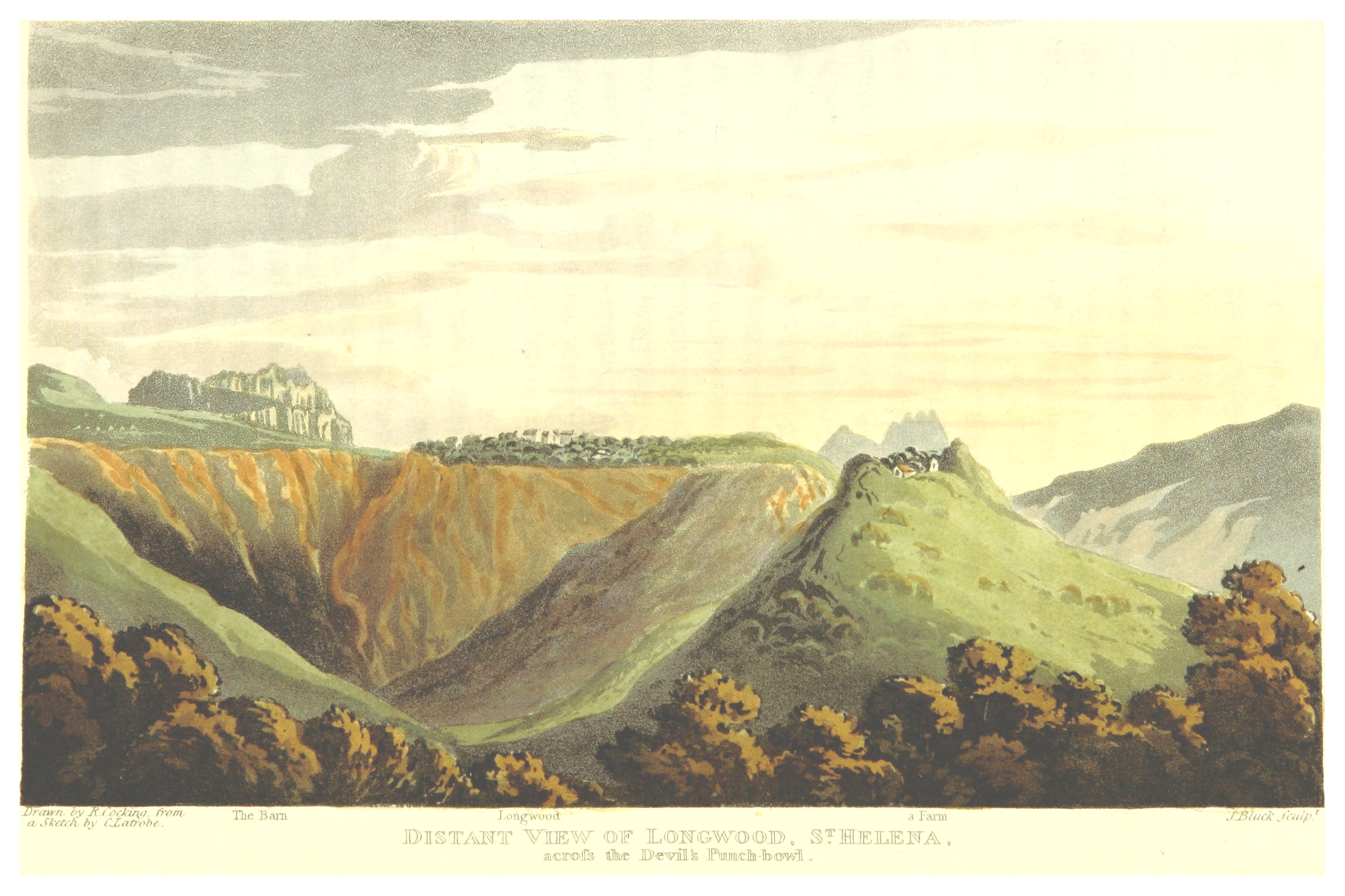
Landscape around Longwood House

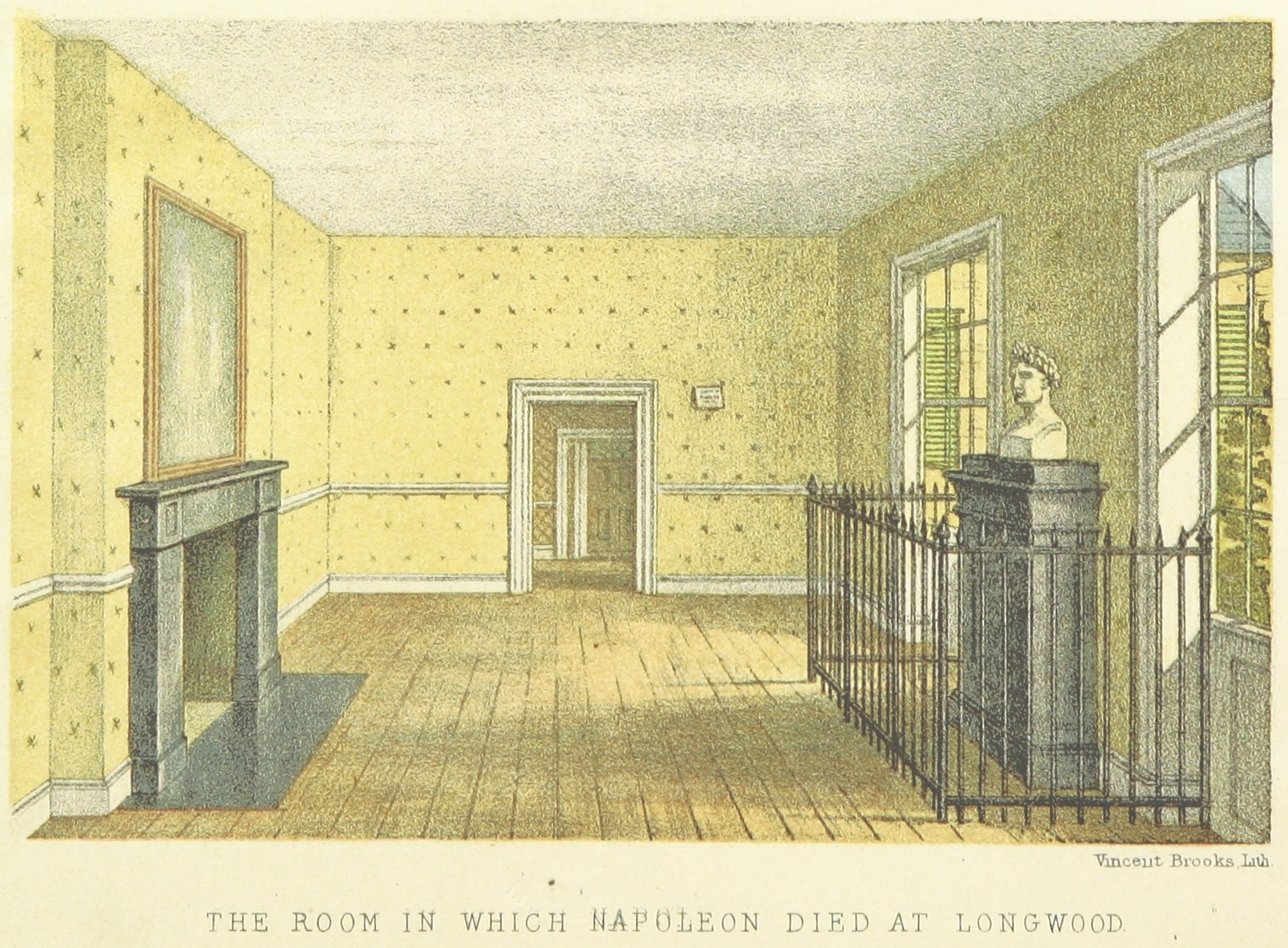
The room in which Napoleon died

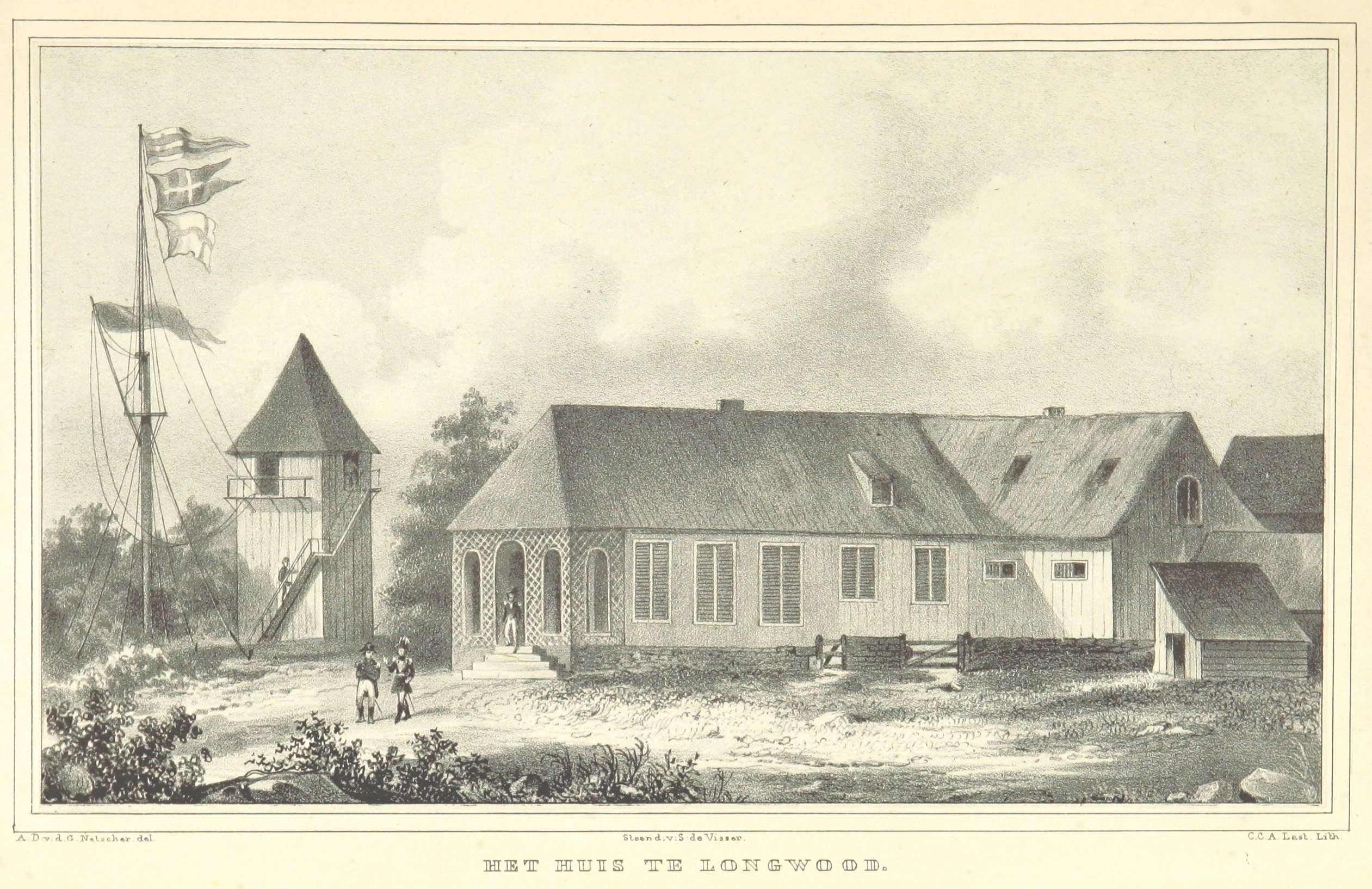
Longwood House in 1837

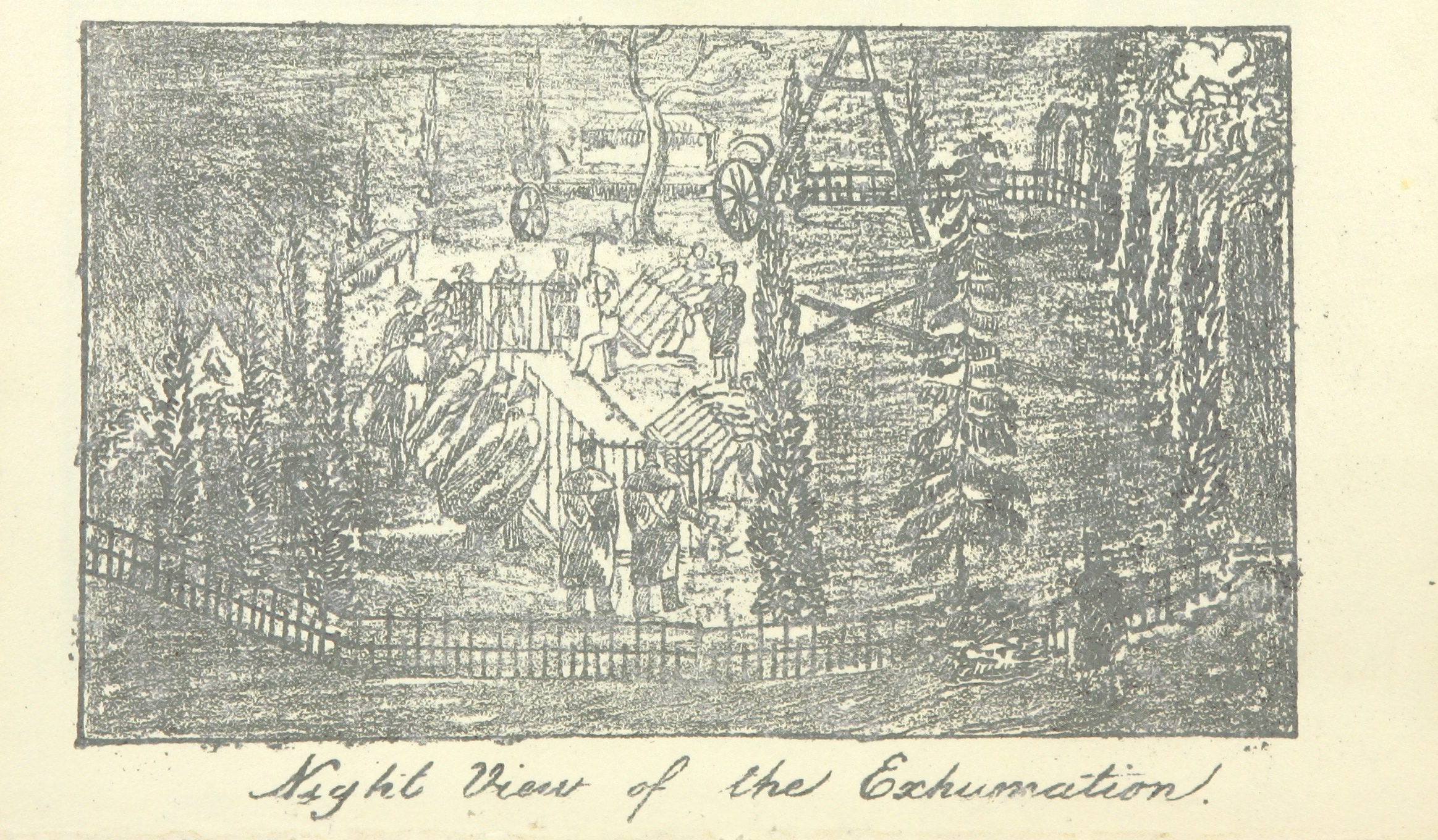
Night view of Napoleon's exhumation in October 1837

== Geography and climate ==
As opposed to the hot and arid Jamestown being near sea level, Longwood is located about 500 metres (1,600 ft) above sea level. Being one of the island's highest settlements, Longwood experiences a cooler variation of the warm-summer mediterranean climate (Köppen climate classification: Csb), bordering on a subtropical highland climate (Köppen climate classification: Cfb) due to its persistent mild temperatures and consistent precipitation levels. Due to its elevated geography, the town has abundant vegetation.

Climate data for Saint Helena (Longwood) (elevation 436 m (1,430 ft), (1991–2020 normals, extremes 1961–1990, 1999–2023)
Month	Jan	Feb	Mar	Apr	May	Jun	Jul	Aug	Sep	Oct	Nov	Dec	Year
Record high °C (°F)	32.2 (90.0)	28.9 (84.0)	30.6 (87.1)	32.2 (90.0)	29.4 (84.9)	28.3 (82.9)	26.7 (80.1)	26.7 (80.1)	26.7 (80.1)	25.0 (77.0)	27.2 (81.0)	28.3 (82.9)	32.2 (90.0)
Mean daily maximum °C (°F)	22.8 (73.0)	23.8 (74.8)	23.8 (74.8)	22.9 (73.2)	21.9 (71.4)	20.0 (68.0)	18.9 (66.0)	18.0 (64.4)	18.0 (64.4)	18.5 (65.3)	19.5 (67.1)	21.2 (70.2)	20.8 (69.4)
Daily mean °C (°F)	20.1 (68.2)	21.2 (70.2)	21.5 (70.7)	20.8 (69.4)	19.6 (67.3)	17.9 (64.2)	16.8 (62.2)	16.1 (61.0)	16.2 (61.2)	16.6 (61.9)	17.4 (63.3)	18.7 (65.7)	18.6 (65.4)
Mean daily minimum °C (°F)	17.8 (64.0)	18.9 (66.0)	19.2 (66.6)	18.6 (65.5)	17.5 (63.5)	15.9 (60.6)	14.9 (58.8)	14.3 (57.7)	14.3 (57.7)	14.6 (58.3)	15.3 (59.5)	16.4 (61.5)	16.5 (61.6)
Record low °C (°F)	15.0 (59.0)	15.6 (60.1)	15.6 (60.1)	13.7 (56.7)	12.9 (55.2)	11.1 (52.0)	10.1 (50.2)	10.8 (51.4)	11.7 (53.1)	11.1 (52.0)	12.2 (54.0)	13.9 (57.0)	11.1 (52.0)
Average precipitation mm (inches)	35.5 (1.40)	42.2 (1.66)	53.5 (2.11)	45.3 (1.78)	39.1 (1.54)	57.6 (2.27)	55.3 (2.18)	57.2 (2.25)	38.6 (1.52)	26.4 (1.04)	20.3 (0.80)	24.1 (0.95)	495.1 (19.5)
Average precipitation days	9.4	9.4	12.5	9.2	8.3	12.0	12.2	14.6	10.9	8.8	6.1	6.8	120.2
Average relative humidity (%)	85	86	85	84	82	82	83	83	84	84	84	84	84
Mean monthly sunshine hours	151.9	178.0	176.7	150.0	161.2	123.0	108.5	93.0	57.0	68.2	72.0	120.9	1,460.4
Mean daily sunshine hours	4.9	6.3	5.7	5.0	5.2	4.1	3.5	3.0	1.9	2.2	2.4	3.9	4.0
Percentage possible sunshine	38	51	47	43	46	37	31	26	16	18	19	30	33
Source 1: Deutscher Wetterdienst (sunshine 1982-1990, humidity 1977-1994)
Source 2: Starlings Roost Weather

== See also ==
- Longwood House
