= Prosperous Bay Plain =

Coordinates: 15.961°S 5.655°W

Map of the island showing the Plain's location at right (east)

Prosperous Bay Plain is an area on the eastern coast of Saint Helena, a British island territory in the South Atlantic Ocean. It is the site of the Saint Helena Airport, and is notable for its high invertebrate biodiversity.

== Geography ==
Prosperous Bay Plain forms part of the eastern arid area of Saint Helena, and covers about 2.25 km^{2}, comprising one of the largest areas of relatively level ground on the island. It was formed 8.5 million years ago by lava flows from Saint Helena's Southwest Volcano. The surface of the plain is covered by rocks, grit and dust, with what little soil there is containing high concentrations of mineral salts.

Within the plain there is a 60 hectare (0.6 km^{2}) depression known as the Central Basin, with a level dusty base. This forms a miniature mature desert ecosystem.

It falls within the district of Longwood.

== Vegetation ==
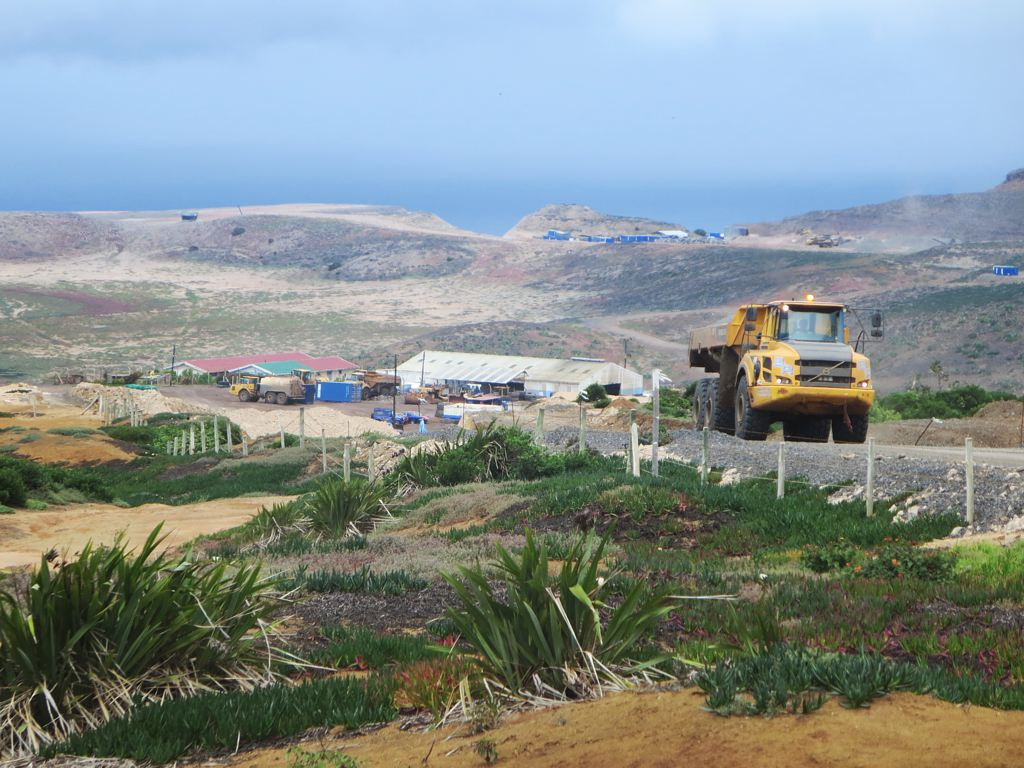
Prosperous Bay during the construction of St Helena Airport

The climate of the plain is arid and plants are few, scattered and low-growing. Dusty areas and gullies are dominated by the native samphire Suaeda fruticosa. In rocky areas the more dominant plant is the introduced Hottentot fig (Carpobrotus edulis). On dry slopes, including those of the Central Basin, there are various chenopods, including the introduced saltbush Atriplex semibaccata. The plain holds a number of important populations of the island's endemic flora. The slopes of Dry Gut hosted the largest remaining group of barn fern (Ceterach haughtonii). Dry Gut was also home to the most abundant remaining population of the endemic boneseed, (Osteospermum sancta-helenae). Annual flushes of endemic babies'-toes (Hydrodea cryptantha), goosefoot (Chenopodium helenense) and neglected sedge (Bulbostylis neglecta) occur across the plain. There are a few scattered scrubwoods (Commidendrum rugosum), teaplants (Frankenia portulacifolia) and salad plant (Hypertelis acida), threatened endemics which may have grown more plentifully in the area in the past, before the introduction of exotic herbivores.

Much of the eastern end of Dry Gut has now been filled in to provide a base for the airport runway.

== Fauna ==
=== Birds ===
Before the discovery of Saint Helena in 1502, the plain was home to seabird breeding colonies. These disappeared after settlement of the island from predation by humans and feral cats. The only endemic land-bird still present is the critically endangered wirebird, of which the plain makes up 10% of its remaining habitat.

=== Invertebrates ===
Prosperous Bay Plain is a biodiversity hotspot, home to an extraordinary concentration of endemic invertebrates, the area being the main evolutionary centre on the island for animals adapted to arid habitats. Some 35–40 species and six genera recorded in this limited area occur nowhere else in the world. The Saint Helena giant earwig used to inhabit the plain, and may still, although there have been no live records of it since 1967. The Saint Helena giant beetle may also be extinct. The mollusc Nesopupa turtoni in the whorl snail family Vertiginidae, previously known only as a fossil and long presumed to be extinct, was discovered alive in a 2003 survey

== Conservation ==
Invertebrate habitats on the plain have been affected by many factors, including the systematic removal of loose and portable rocks for construction purposes, the formation of vehicle tracks, and the building of structures such as forts. The main threat to the invertebrate communities is the Saint Helena Airport, now completed, which, together with access roads, involved destruction of part of the plain, including part of the Central Basin.
