= Saint Helena Airport =

Airport in the British Overseas Territory of Saint Helena

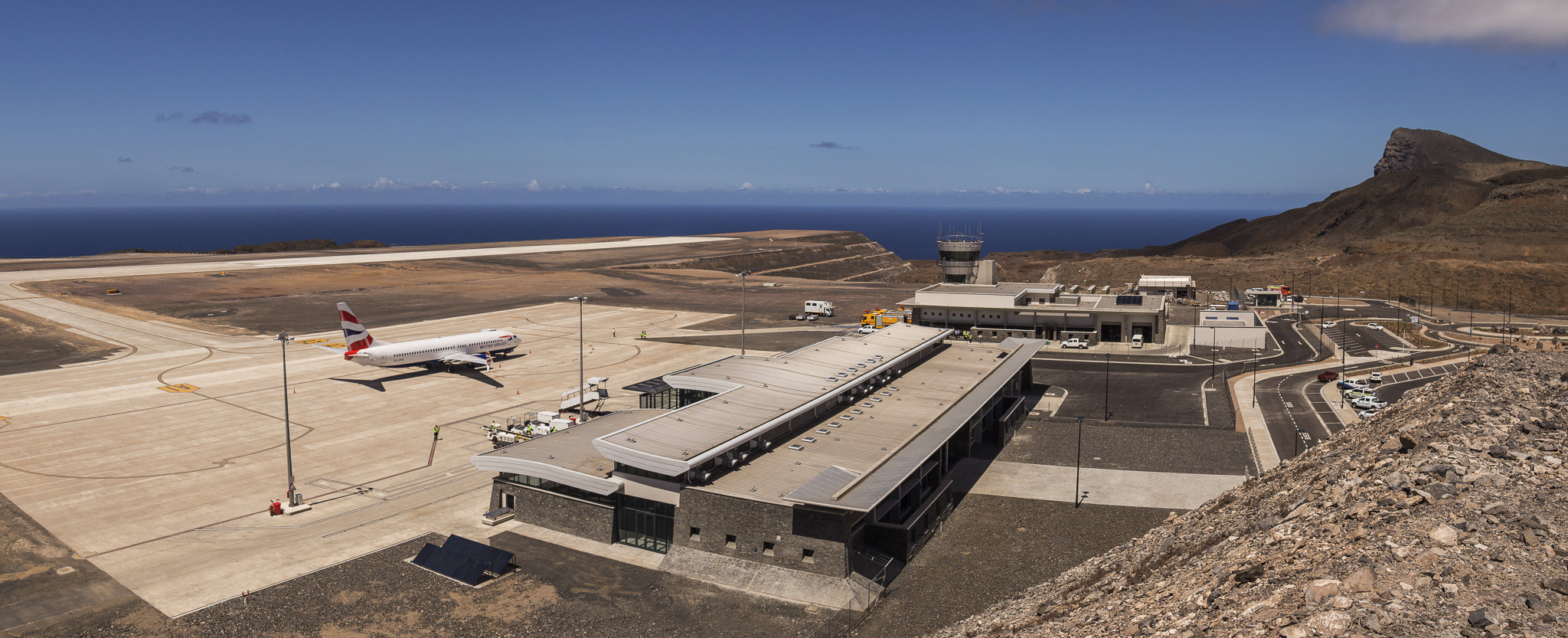
- IATA: HLE; ICAO: FHSH; WMO: 61901

Summary
- Airport type: Public
- Owner: Saint Helena Government
- Operator: St Helena Airport Limited
- Location: Longwood, Saint Helena, Ascension and Tristan da Cunha
- Opened: June 2016; 10 years ago
- Elevation AMSL: 1,017 ft (310 m)
- Coordinates: 15°57′33″S 5°38′45″W
- Website: sthelenaairport.com

Map
- Location of St Helena Airport

Runways
Direction	Length		Surface
Direction	m	ft	Surface
01/19	1,950	6,398	Concrete

Statistics (2018)
- Passengers: 7649
- Sources: AIP St Helena, St Helena Government

Saint Helena Airport (IATA: HLE, ICAO: FHSH) is an international airport on Saint Helena, a remote island in the south Atlantic Ocean, in the British Overseas Territory of Saint Helena, Ascension, and Tristan da Cunha.

The construction of the runway was finished in 2015 and the airport opened in 2016. The inaugural scheduled flight was delayed, but general aviation, charter, and medical evacuation flights were able to serve the airport from May 2016.

The airport began scheduled commercial services on 14 October 2017, when the South African carrier Airlink inaugurated a weekly service from O. R. Tambo International Airport in Johannesburg, South Africa, via Walvis Bay Airport, Namibia, using an Embraer E190-100IGW, about one and a half years after the originally expected inauguration date. The service was flown with a smaller-sized aircraft because of wind shear problems affecting the airport. Additionally, monthly charter flights operate between Ascension Island and Saint Helena.

== History ==
=== Background ===
Saint Helena is more than 2,000 kilometres (1,200 mi) from the nearest major landmass. Prior to the opening of the airport, the island was only reachable by sea, making it one of the most remote populated places on earth, measured as travel time from major cities. Sea journeys used to take five days from Cape Town, with departures once every three weeks.

The first consideration of an airport on Saint Helena was made in 1943 by the South African Air Force, which undertook a survey on Prosperous Bay Plain from October 1943 until January 1944. They concluded that, while technically feasible, an airport was not a practical proposition.

It was suggested that an airport would extend the United Kingdom's capabilities to carry out airborne missions in the South Atlantic region, such as maritime patrols in accordance with international fishing agreements (e.g., International Commission for the Conservation of Atlantic Tunas), counter-piracy missions along important trade routes, and also airlift operations notably into Southern Africa.

According to analysts, the UK government's decision to finally go ahead with the airport, after long delays, seemed to be driven in part by concerns over a continuing tense standoff with Argentina over the Falkland Islands sovereignty dispute. The island is about 3,812 miles (6,135 km) from the Falklands – seven hours and 40 minutes' flight time. But, analysts say that was nevertheless an improvement over the previous state of isolation from the UK for both St Helena and the Falklands.

The following possible benefits were also factors in the decision-making process:

- Air access would allow Saint Helena to develop its tourism sector.
- The new wharf in Rupert's Bay could allow regularly passing cruise ships to land passengers on the island and bring tourists if sized appropriately. The lack of a protected landing facility represented a limitation on the development of cruise tourism. In unfavourable sea conditions, landing was hazardous and potential revenue was lost as many cruise ships refused to allow passengers to land in such circumstances. In addition, because there was no protected landing facility, many cruise companies did not incorporate St Helena into their itineraries. The sea is roughest in summer, which marks the peak of the cruise season.
- Medical evacuations to South Africa for treatment of serious cases of illness would be sped up significantly: it may take up to one month until transport to South Africa by RMS St Helena became available.
- The availability of heavy construction equipment would facilitate alternative energy projects, such as the construction of larger wind turbines, a tidal power plant or a dam with a hydro-power station in one of St Helena's valleys.
- Limitations in cargo size of the RMS St Helena and the unavailability of a large crane prohibited construction of larger wind turbines.

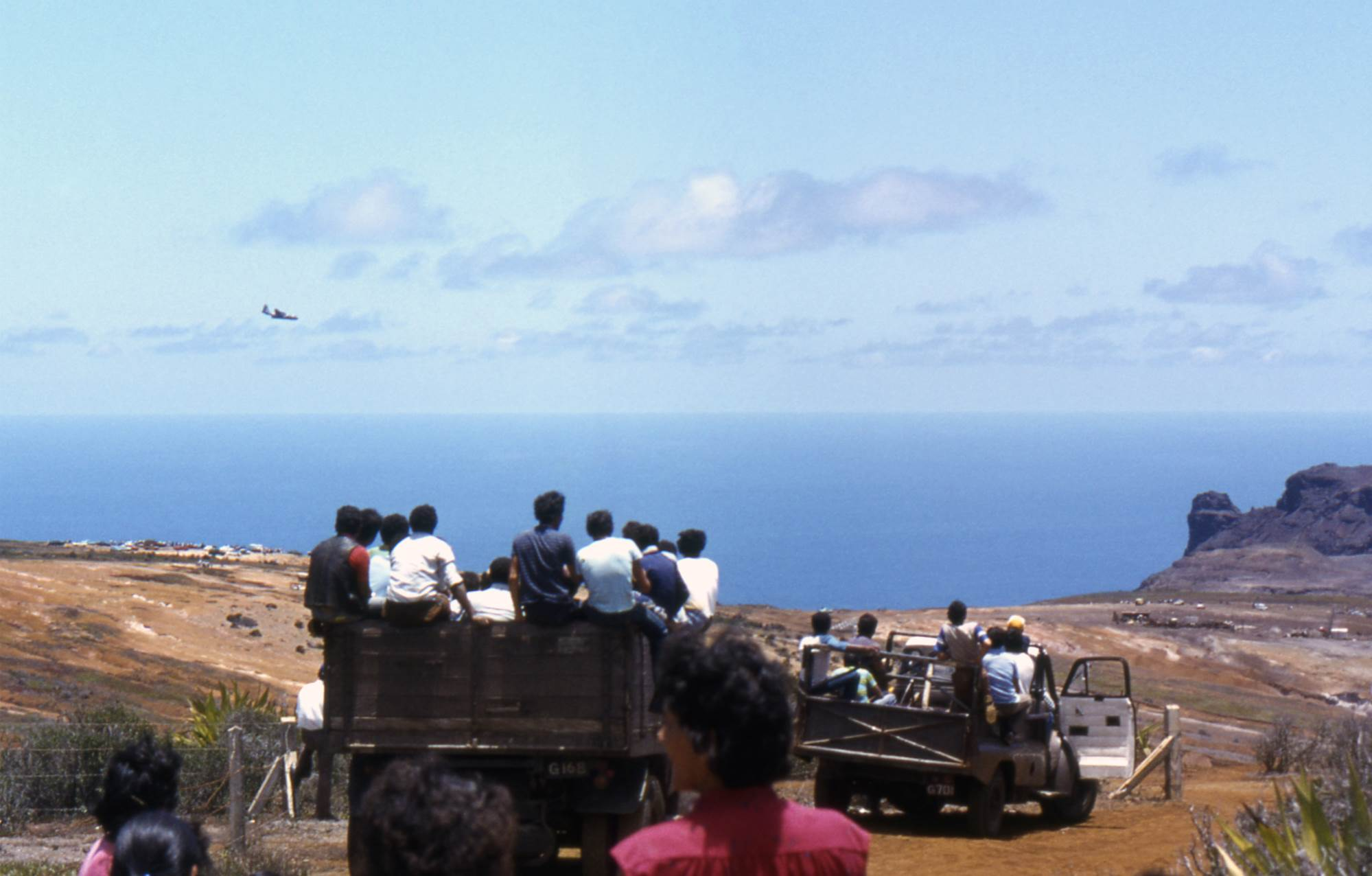
View over Prosperous Bay Plain in the 1980s

In contrast to the projected benefits, there were concerns that the proposed construction on the Prosperous Bay Plain would be detrimental to the local environment. Specifically, Prosperous Bay Plain was one of the few remaining sites on Saint Helena that held significant ecological diversity. According to a 2004 review by Atkins Management Consultants, the survival of numerous endemic species critically depended on the preservation and protection of the location. It was also an important nesting site for the Saint Helena plover, Saint Helena's national bird, which is listed as vulnerable. Although the St. Helena Leisure Corporation was a major force pushing for the airport's construction, its co-founder Sir Nigel Thompson was a former chairman of the environmental charity Campaign to Protect Rural England.

=== Bidding process ===
After a long period of rumour and consultation, in March 2005 the British government announced plans to construct an airport in Saint Helena, expected to be completed by 2010 and funded by the Department for International Development (DfID).

According to Private Eye magazine, all of the companies tendering for the job of building and running the airport had withdrawn from bidding for the project by late September 2006. The local Access Office explained that it seemed the bidders considered the DfID was unhelpful by not providing the possibility of on-site investigations in order to complete a detailed design before providing a fixed price for the project. According to the DfID's Director for Overseas Territories, his department remained committed to an airport for St Helena.

DfID restarted the procurement process to identify a suitable Design, Build and Operate (DBO) contractor in October 2006. Capability statements were received by DfID in March 2007 and four bidders were pre-approved for the DBO contract and a further three applicants have been pre-approved for the Air Service Provider contract. The applicants for the DBO visited the island for six months from June 2007 before submitting their final proposals, and by January 2008, DfID was down to a shortlist of two bidders.

There were delays by the British government, which went up to Prime Minister Gordon Brown who insisted on personally reviewing the paperwork. An approved bidder, the Italian company Impregilo was appointed in 2008. The project was suspended in November of the same year because of financial pressures brought on by the 2008 financial crisis.

The St Helena Leisure Corporation (Shelco) was set up by Arup's Sir Nigel Thompson and Berwin Leighton Paisner's Robert Jones, who planned to construct luxury resorts and a hotel to be run by Oberoi Hotels & Resorts in conjunction with the airport. Though real estate was to be sold before construction had started, the proposal was turned down by the local government and the DfID.

The cost of the airport was reported to be £285.5 million for DfID in April 2016.

=== Airport design and construction ===
Approximately £202 million was funded for design and construction by South African engineering group Basil Read (Pty) Ltd, which was awarded the contract on 4 November 2011. The UK government also granted additional funds of up to £10 million in shared-risk contingency, and £35.1 million for 10 years of operation by South African airport operator Lanseria Airport. The airport would be the largest single investment ever made on the island.

Design work started immediately after the contract award. Following the second visit by a Basil Read team (during December 2011) the project manager settled on the island and the first St Helenian citizen was employed.

Preparation works began in early 2012 in Rupert's Valley on the west coast, which included establishing storage facilities, a temporary fuel farm, and the design and construction of a temporary wharf. A new jetty was built at Rupert's Bay to enable the landing of supplies and construction vehicles.

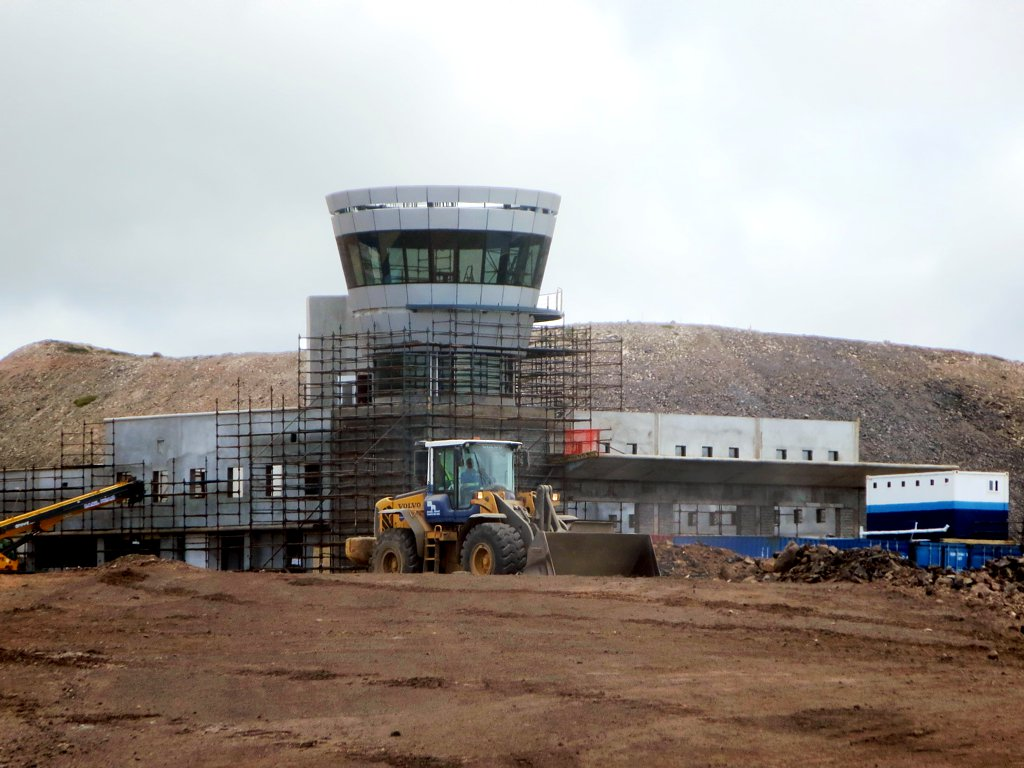
Construction of the airport terminal and air traffic control tower

Logistics of the airport's construction were critical because of the island's isolated location and the lack of construction equipment, which would require everything to be shipped in, resulting in a huge logistics problem. Due to the limited landing infrastructure, with no breakwater or mooring facilities at the sea front, new harbour facilities capable of handling construction equipment and fuel supplies were constructed at Rupert's Bay. Fuel transfers between Rupert's Bay and the aerodrome, connected by a 14-kilometre (9 mi) haul road, were assumed to be by road tanker for 20 years, after which a capital allowance was made for enlargement of the bulk fuel storage and the installation of a fuel transfer pipeline.

Basil Read sourced its own ship, a roll-on/roll-off vessel called NP Glory 4 flying the Thai flag, which docked for the first time at St Helena on 11 July 2012 and subsequently provided regular supplies to the island, including cargo and personnel for the project.

On 17 July 2012, the St. Helena Government and Basil Read agreed to a change to the runway design, which including widening the embankment over an additional 40 metres (130 ft) at the southern end, paving an additional 100 metres (330 ft) of the runway with concrete, providing larger turning circles at the runway ends, and increasing the size of the apron.

In contrast to the 2011 reference design for the airport it would now have a full 240-metre (790 ft) runway end safety area (RESA) at the southern end of the runway instead of the planned engineered materials arresting system (EMAS). The intention was to add an EMAS designed for Boeing 737-800 later butting onto the southern end of the paved runway to increase the declarable landing distance available (LDA) to 1,650 metres (5,410 ft), to allow the operation of larger aircraft such as the Boeing 737-800 and Airbus A320.

In June 2013, the 100,000th truckload of fill went into Dry Gut, a gorge which had to be raised by almost 100 metres (330 ft) in order to create an embankment that would finally carry parts of the runway. This was equivalent to nearly 19% of the total of 8 million cubic metres required. Basil Read's calculations showed that a further 430,000 truckloads of material would be needed to complete the fill.

In October 2013 the St Helena government and Basil Read formally agreed to expand the runway shoulders, taxiway and apron to accommodate ICAO Code D aircraft, and to increase the fire fighting capacity (ICAO rescue fire fighting service category 7).

These enhancements make it possible for the Lockheed C-130 Hercules and the Boeing 757 to operate to and from St. Helena, though the runway is unlikely to be long enough to accommodate larger Code D aircraft, such as the Boeing 767. The upgrade was to be funded from cost savings on other parts of the project, particularly by a simplified runway drainage system.

In September 2013, workers employed by Basil Read went on strike in a dispute over working conditions and wages – it was the island's first strike in half a century.

By summer 2015, the Dry Gut fill project was completed and the new runway built. Construction of the airport was completed on schedule.

=== Airport certification and opening ===
Avia Solutions Group was appointed to support the St Helena Government (SHG) and the UK Department for International Development (DFID) in reaching a contract with an air service provider to provide services to the island.

Calibration flights at the airport began in mid-September 2015. A Beechcraft King Air 200, leased from TAB Charters in South Africa, landed on 15 September 2015 in order to perform tests of the airport navigation systems. UK-based Flight Calibration Services undertook the flights and flew from Lanseria International Airport, in Johannesburg, flying via Namibia and Angola. The aircraft was on site for approximately one week to undertake the calibration flights.

Opening was originally scheduled for February 2016, but this was postponed a number of times because of issues related to air traffic control. In November 2015, a delay of the opening from February to May 2016 was announced. This was needed "in order to fine tune the operational readiness of the airport".

Due to uncertainties concerning weather conditions and, in particular the amount of turbulence on the approaches from fallwinds resulting from the elevated location and the surrounding bluffs, it was recommended that a charter aircraft should perform approaches to and departures from the intended runway. By April 2016 such flights had taken place, and they were not positive, causing a delay in traffic start.

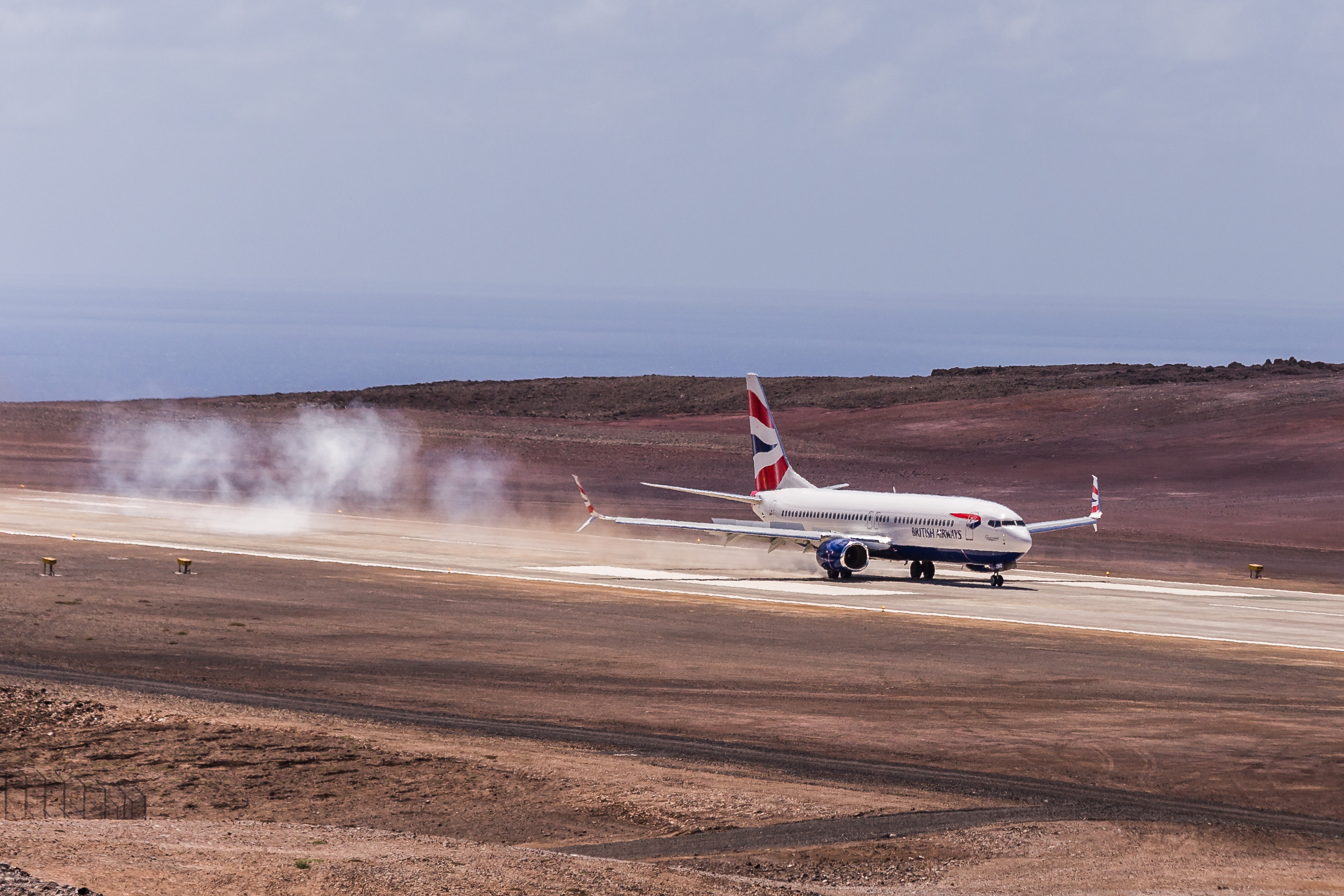
The Boeing 737-800 implementation flight landing at the airport

The first large (above 100 seats) passenger jet landed on 18 April 2016, a Boeing 737-800 operated by Comair. It was an implementation flight without passengers, to test the route, ground operations and handling, ahead of commencement of scheduled services. The landing had complications: the first approach was a planned go-around to familiarize the pilots with the airport, the second was aborted close to the ground by the pilots due to wind shear, and on the third (successful) approach it also experienced wind shear. On 26 April, the St. Helena Government announced an indefinite delay in opening the airport, because of safety concerns about wind shear. The economic impact included extending the use of the RMS St Helena, which was due to be retired after the airport opened.

Following an inspection in April 2016, on 10 May, UK-based Air Safety Support International (ASSI), a subsidiary company of the Civil Aviation Authority responsible for aviation safety in Overseas Territories, issued an Aerodrome Certificate to St Helena Airport. This safety certificate indicated that airport infrastructure, aviation security measures and air traffic control service complied with international aviation safety and security standards. ASSI did not allow the airport to go into commercial operation, however, due to concerns over operational readiness of monitoring and clearing issues that include wind shear and turbulence.

The airport opened in June 2016, but restrictions for large aircraft remained due to dangerous wind shear. The airport's advocates hope that it will bring growth to the island's economy through tourism, leading to financial self-sustainability and an end to UK budgetary aid.

A new safety certificate was delivered on 26 October 2016 by Air Safety Support International. After the bankruptcy of the company Basil Read which built and operated the airport, the Saint Helena government owned company took over the operations, for which it got a new safety certificate on 5 October 2018.

=== Early air traffic history ===
Since the airport opened, through to early April 2017, 32 private aircraft have landed at the airport. These flights were mostly for either business passengers or medical evacuation purposes. The aircraft involved were smaller and lighter than the Boeing 737 and usually landed in the opposite direction on the runway from that taken by the 737-800 implementation flight in the southbound direction. The opposite, northbound, direction has an approach which is generally less turbulent but can only be used by lighter aircraft.

The first helicopter to use the airport was an AgustaWestland Wildcat HMA.2 of 201 Flight 825 Naval Air Squadron attached to the Type 23 frigate HMS Lancaster on 14 October 2015.

An important reason to build the airport was availability for medical emergency evacuation. On 3 June 2016 the first ambulance flight took place, for a baby and his mother.

There are no aircraft dedicated to calibration flights, but occasionally such flights have taken place. On Friday 21 October 2016, an Avro RJ100 jet airliner sponsored by Atlantic Star Airlines landed on St Helena Airport, with 13 non-commercial passengers on board, as part of a delivery to Chile. Both pilots were from the Faroe Islands and had experience from there with landing in windy conditions. On 30 November and 1 December of 2016 an Embraer ERJ-190-100 operated by Embraer Aviation staff from Brazil made a number of test landings and starts on St Helena Airport.

On 18 December 2016 a Royal Air Force C-130J Hercules landed at St Helena, the first fixed-wing military aircraft to land on the island. A South African Air Force C-130 visited the airport twice in July 2017.

=== Establishing commercial air service ===
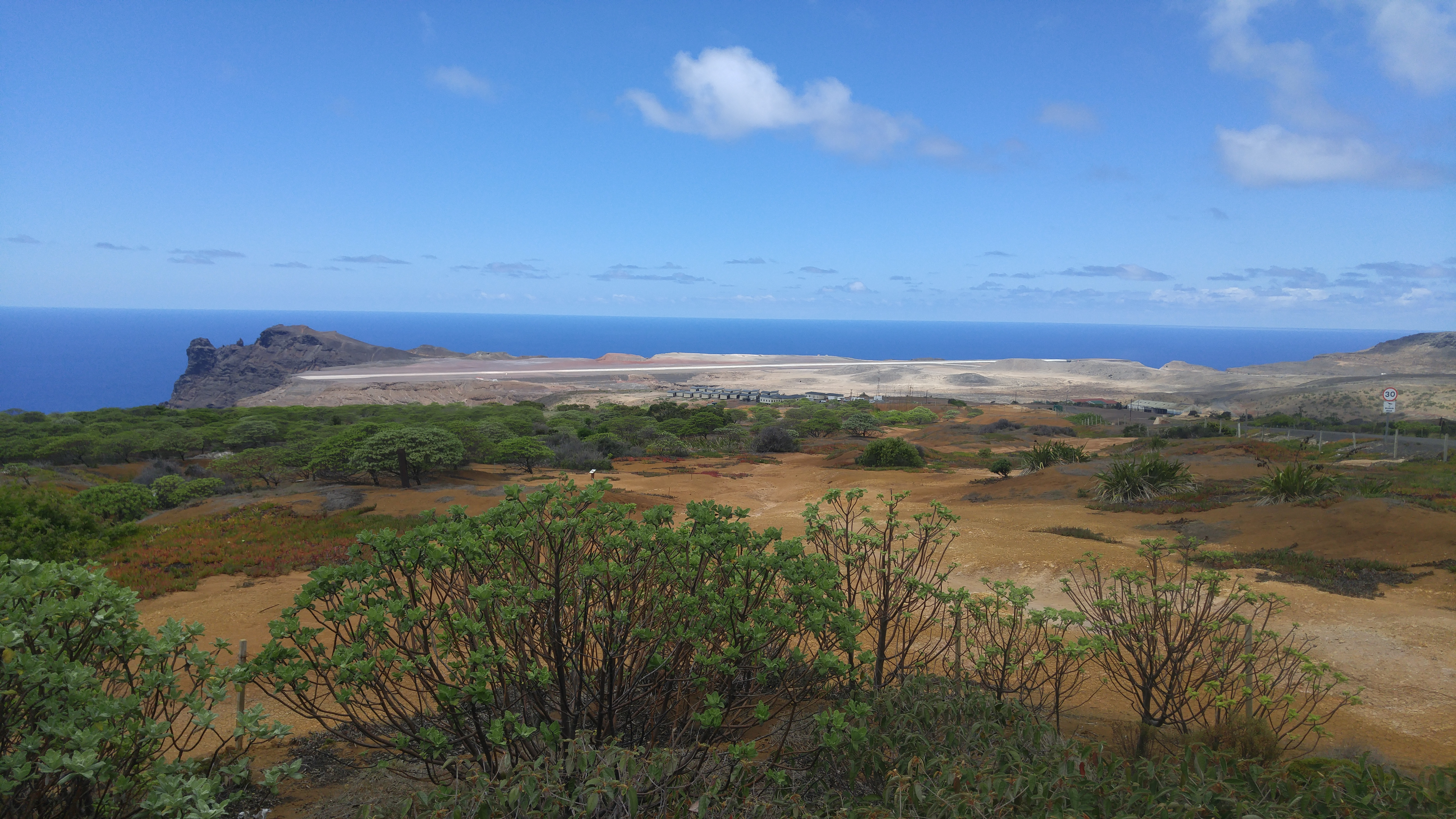
Saint Helena Airport viewed from the Millennium Forest

Before the opening of the airport, it was decided that St. Helena would have an open skies policy, which allows any airline operator who meets all required standards to fly in and out of St. Helena. Projections for commercial flight costs were also drawn up and the St Helena Government expected that a return economy flight from St Helena to South Africa would cost around £600. Assuming that an off-peak economy seat from South Africa to the UK would be available for approximately £700, return tickets for flights via South Africa to the UK would take the total price to around £1,300.

Due to the runway length and the distance to South Africa (3,700 km (2,299 mi) to Johannesburg), a Boeing 737-700 flying to Johannesburg serving St. Helena would not be able to use its full seat and cargo capacity. Only flights to and from Namibian and Angolan destinations would allow using a Boeing 737-700 near its full load capacity. This was under the condition that both directions of the runway were available so tailwind landings could be avoided. The other planned destination, London, requires a fuel stop in Gambia, at almost the same distance as Johannesburg. However, if Wideawake Airfield on Ascension Island was open for commercial non-military flights, it could be listed as an alternative aerodrome; as it is only 1,300 km (808 mi) from St Helena this would mean that the load capacity of an inbound Boeing 737-700 could be increased as smaller fuel reserves would be required, since the alternative aerodrome could be used in case of problems at St Helena.

It was thought that reductions in ticket prices might be achieved by using spare payload capacity on flights to and from St Helena to carry air freight (e.g., agricultural products, coffee, fish). At 70% passenger load factor a B737-800 operating, on an average day, into St Helena would have a spare payload capacity of some 4,000 kilograms (8,800 lb). The extra income possible per in-bound flight from cargo could be as high as the income equivalent of 19 passengers, giving an effective load factor of 88% and could reduce ticket prices.

On 16 March 2015 it was announced that SHG and DFID had appointed Comair Limited as the preferred bidder for the provision of air services to St Helena. Comair was proposing a weekly flight between Johannesburg Airport and St Helena using a Boeing 737-800 aircraft, which has a flight time from Johannesburg to St Helena of about four and a half hours. Reaction to the Comair announcement on St Helena was largely negative, with stories of luggage loss and crime in Johannesburg, and the fact that many of St Helena's residents have personal links with Cape Town.

On 9 October 2015, Governor Mark Capes indicated that there would be a flight from St Helena to Ascension Island provided by Comair once a month . The Ascension Island Government also announced a connection between the two islands. The connection was to be flown by Comair using a Boeing 737-800. The flight would have taken about two hours to Wideawake Airfield. Comair's air services between St Helena Airport and O. R. Tambo International Airport in Johannesburg were scheduled to commence in late May 2016, to coincide with the official opening of the airport on 21 May 2016. These dates were postponed because of the problems with wind shear; however, Comair did operate a few test flights which concluded in the windshear risk, mainly for aircraft of that size and larger.

Atlantic Star Airlines (operated by TUI Airlines Netherlands) had announced an intention to operate charter flights from London-Gatwick via Gambia (possibly starting May 2016) using a Boeing 737-800, an aircraft requiring a fairly long runway. This leaves Lubango Airport in Angola, at a distance of 1,300 miles (2,100 km) as the next best diversion option for which every inbound aircraft must carry enough fuel reserve, limiting its load capacity.

In response to the wind shear problems, in June 2016, Governor Lisa Phillips noted that restricting flight operations to runway 02, that is northbound landings and southbound starts on St Helena's single operating surface, might be a suitable interim solution. While runway 02 does not suffer from a significant wind shear problem, restricting landings to one direction would prevent large aircraft from calling at St Helena. Only permitting landings in one direction would mean that aircraft must to be able to land in tailwind. Consequently, large aircraft, like the 737-800, could not be used because, in a tailwind, they would need a longer runway than St Helena provides. If runway 20 is used, it will have severe wind restrictions.

A debate about the project was held by the House of Lords in London on 17 October 2016. When asked by Lord Foulkes when the government expected commercial flights would start at the airport, the Minister of State, Department for International Development Lord Bates said, "scheduled commercial flights will begin when the conditions are considered safe to do so and the St Helena Government are able to contract an airline with the right aircraft and regulatory approval".

In December 2016, the Saint Helena government issued a tender for an airline to establish a scheduled commercial service, using the less turbulent northbound landing direction only. Atlantic Star Airlines has entered a bid on a proposed plan to base two aircraft at Saint Helena. They would carry up to 60 passengers on round-trip flights from Saint Helena to the international airport in Accra, the capital of Ghana. On 5 February 2017 there was a deadline for airlines to submit application bids for the provision of air services to St Helena under the new requirements, and there were a number of bids.

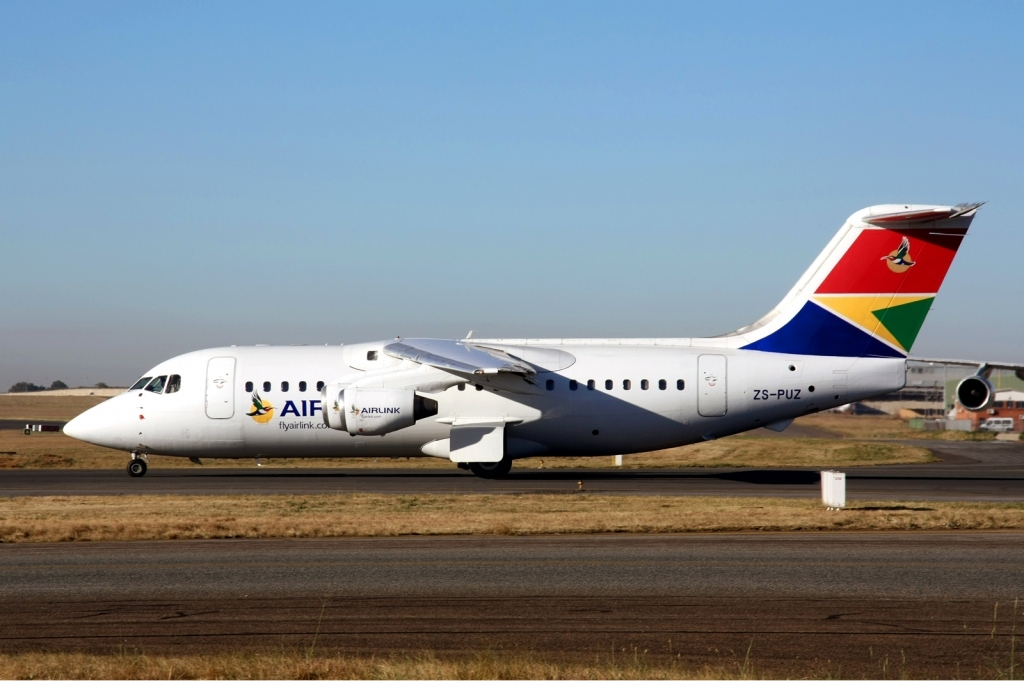
An Airlink Avro RJ85 flew the first charter passengers to and from St Helena on 3 May 2017.

On 3 May 2017, the first commercial charter flight with paying passengers took place. SA Airlink operated the flight from Cape Town, using an Avro RJ85 aircraft with 60 passengers on board. It refueled in Moçâmedes (Angola) when going to St Helena and in Windhoek when going to Cape Town. Technical problems with RMS St Helena meant that the island was isolated for at least two months, so the flight was needed.

On 9 June 2017, Airlink won the bid to operate the first scheduled commercial flights to St Helena Airport. On 22 July 2017 it was announced the airline would operate weekly flights to Johannesburg via Windhoek in Namibia, with a monthly link to Ascension Island. The flights will be on Embraer E190 aircraft filling a maximum of only 76 of the 99 seats due to runway limitations related to the wind shear issues. Airlink conducted a successful proving flight on 23 August 2017 and commenced passenger flights on 14 October 2017. The first scheduled flight landed on 14 October 2017 around 14:00 UTC without any problems, although it was slightly delayed. The flight used the southbound direction, the one with wind shear problems, but the wind was fairly calm. Airlink was after some time denied letting passengers embark and disembark in Windhoek because it was not given right to carry passengers between Namibia and foreign countries. From April 2019 Airlink refuels in Walvis Bay instead, giving right to have 98 passengers because of shorter distance, having in mind that no connections are allowed in Namibia anyway. The flights still (2019) stop in Windhoek or Walvis Bay for refuel westbound, but fly nonstop to Johannesburg if there is not too much upwind. On 18 November 2017, the airline started a monthly charter operation to Ascension Island.

After half a year of operation it was found that the regularity was better than expected with only one day of flights delayed until another day, and that ticket demand was higher than expected. The government announced in May 2018 that a second weekly flight will be performed during the southern summer season of December 2018 to April 2019, as well as two more flights to Ascension during the Christmas/New year period. During December 2019 to February 2020 flights went to and from Cape Town, the traditional link to Saint Helena during the boat era.

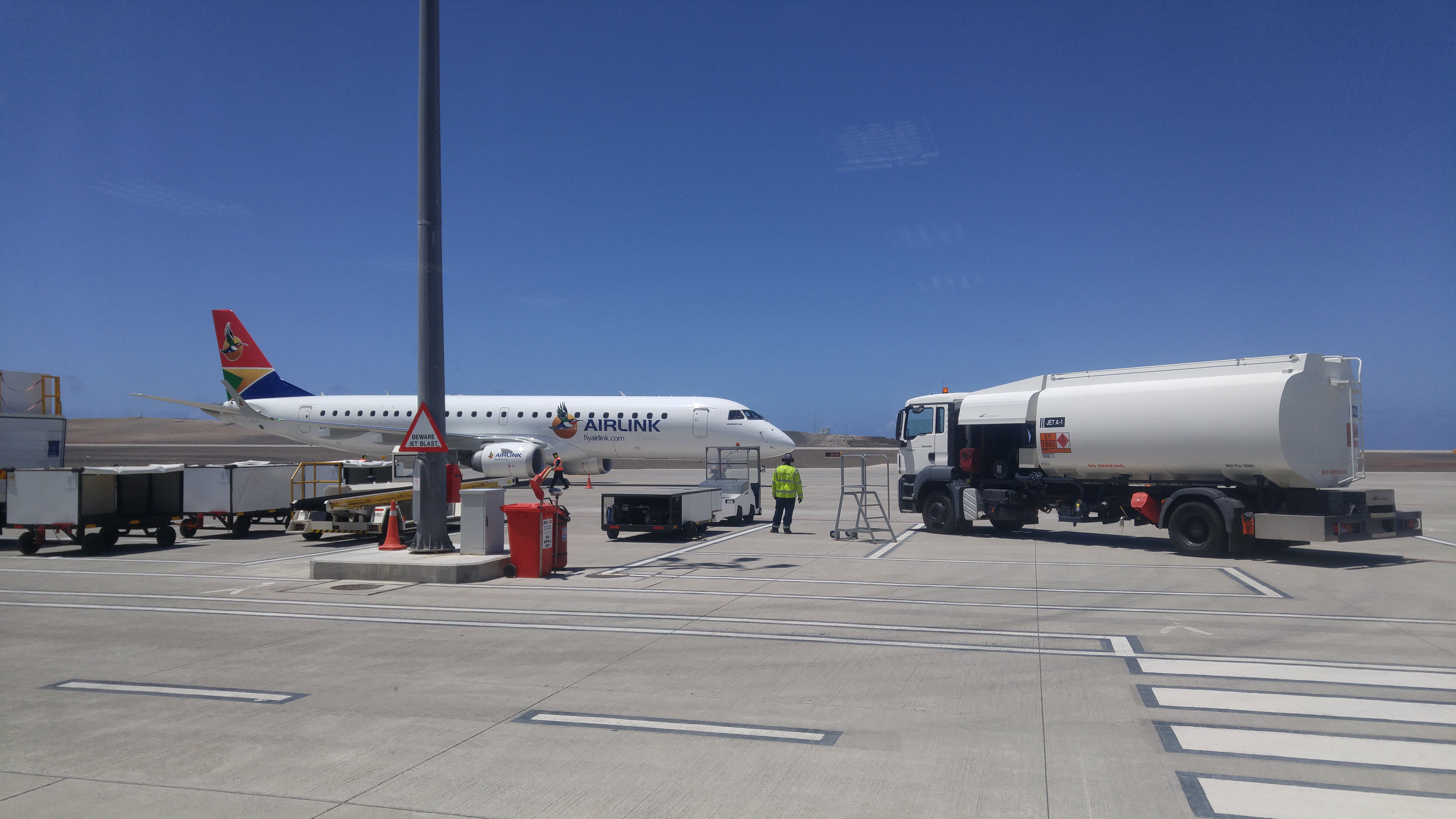
An Airlink E190 about to refuel in 2020

The southern autumn and winter means higher challenges with low clouds and stormy weather. The flights planned for 14 July 2018 were delayed a full week because of weather, and the schedule of August 2018 was also heavily disrupted.

Beginning March 2020, only residents, citizens or other permitted people were allowed to enter the island, due to the COVID-19 pandemic, and all arriving had to stay isolated for two weeks. This and restrictions in South Africa caused the cancellation of all flights to Saint Helena and Ascension from 25 March for a long period. The M/V Helena freight ship still visits the island and medical air evacuation were still permitted. A few charter flights were still performed in order to bring in essential medical staff and supplies, people needing to get home etc. On 20 April 2020, an Airbus A318 chartered from Titan Airways flew from London and also conducted six landings to fulfil crew training requirements in anticipation of future flights to the island (because landing with passengers requires a pilot with previous experience with the airport). On 19 May 2020, Airlink performed such a flight from Johannesburg. On 19 July 2020, the first non-stop return flights from Europe took place when a Bombardier Global 6000 flew from Switzerland to Saint Helena and back to France to evacuate workers for a port construction project. On 30 July 2020, a further charter flight from London was performed, this time with a Boeing 757-200 from Titan Airways, the largest aircraft to have been on St Helena Airport. These 757 flights were performed around once per month the rest of 2020, refuelling in Accra, Ghana. In March 2022, normal scheduled flights to South Africa returned after the pandemic.

In February 2022, the runway designations changed from 02 and 20 to 01 and 19 respectively. This change was due to a slight shift in the Earth's magnetic field.

The airport was officially opened by Prince Edward, Duke of Edinburgh on 26 January 2024.

In February 2026, technical assessments led to the airport being downgraded from Category 6 after concerns were raised about the operational readiness of its fire tenders. The airport was consequently closed to all air traffic, and Airlink was unable to operate, resulting in all flights being cancelled. Medical evacuation flights resumed a few days later once Category 4 was achieved. The fire tender issue was fully resolved on 15 February 2026, when Category 6 status was reinstated and scheduled and charter services returned to normal operations.

== Airlines and destinations ==
Airlines	Destinations
Airlink	Johannesburg–O. R. Tambo; Seasonal: Cape Town; Charter: Ascension Island

== Aerodrome characteristics, equipment and facilities ==
Location of the airport on St Helena, on the east side of the island

The airport was built on Prosperous Bay Plain, on the east side of Saint Helena, entailing a concrete runway length of 1,950 metres (6,398 ft) with taxiway and apron, an approximately 8-million-cubic-metre (280-million-cubic-foot) rockfill embankment through which a 750-metre (2,460 ft) long reinforced concrete culvert was proposed but contractor Basil Read got approval to use an open channel instead. This was approved by the St Helena Government, together with an airport terminal building of 3,500 square metres (38,000 sq ft) and support infrastructure, air traffic control and safety, bulk fuel installation for six million litres (1.3 million imperial gallons; 1.6 million US gallons) of diesel and aviation fuel, a 14-kilometre (9 mi) airport access road from Rupert's Bay to the airport, and all related logistics. The airport has a LDA (landing distance available) of 1,535 metres (5,036 ft) for the northbound runway direction (01) and 1,550 metres (5,085 ft) for the wind shear-affected southbound runway direction (19).

=== Aircraft compatibility ===
Aircraft must be able to take off and land on the 1,950 m runway, and have enough range to divert from St Helena back to the mainland if they cannot land if the airport is closed, for example due to weather. The distance from the nearest African mainland airport is almost 2,500 kilometres (1,600 mi).

The airport can accommodate two twin-engined passenger aircraft up to the size of the Airbus A319, Boeing 737, and the Boeing 757-200. The airport has also been visited by a Lockheed C-130 Hercules, and a Boeing C-17 (the largest of the listed aircraft).

Airlink's scheduled service uses the Embraer ERJ-190.

=== Facilities ===
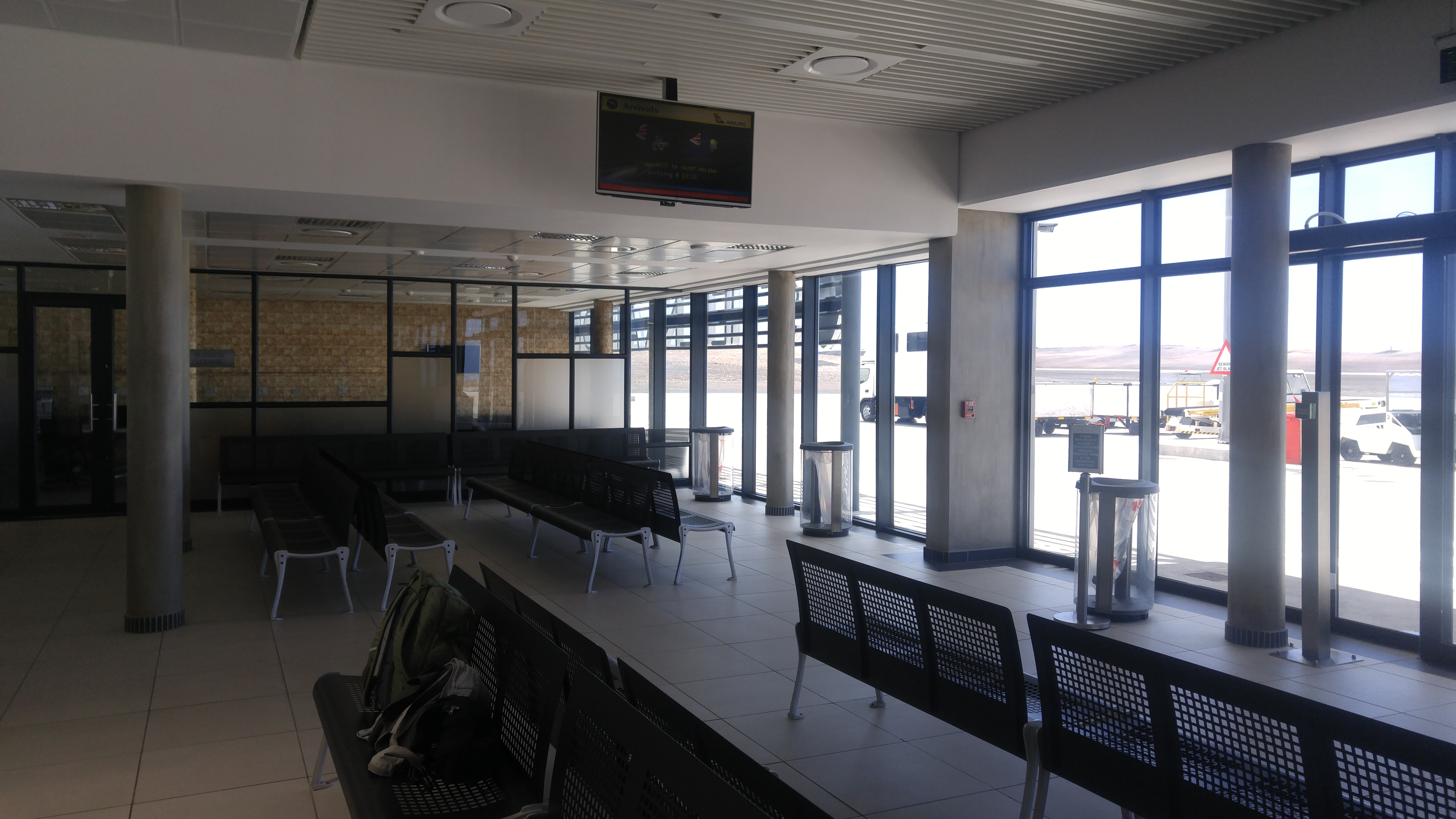
Inside the passenger terminal

There are two main buildings, the terminal building, and the combined building for airport operations, e.g. air traffic control, rescue services, etc. In addition there are some smaller buildings. The terminal building has a café, a gift shop, a duty-free shop and a restaurant.

=== Navigation aids ===
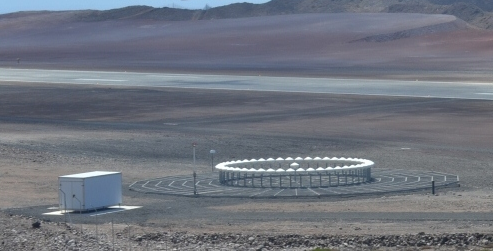
Doppler VHF omnidirectional range (DVOR) system at St Helena Airport

The distance from key destinations, the length of runway available, and the type of aircraft available in the region dictate that air services to St Helena must operate to the requirements of extended twin engine operations (ETOPS) which implies the provision of an instrument approach system based on an off-set instrument landing system localiser (ILS LLZ).

Such is also required by the terrain of the airport which, in commercial passenger air transport terms, is safety-critical due to its steep approaches, high elevation (1,000 ft or 300 m above sea level) and rocky outcrops. Without an instrument approach the provision of a viable air service would be considered impossible.

Because of the above, St Helena Airport was equipped with an instrument landing system (ILS) and a Doppler VHF omnidirectional range system (DVOR) supplied by Thales Group. Further to that Honeywell Aerospace supplied a SmartPath ground-based augmentation system (GBAS), a technology that augments global positioning system (GPS) signals to make them suitable for precision approach and landing. It overcomes many of the limitations of instrument landing systems (ILS) traditionally used by airports to guide aircraft as they approach the runway.

=== Capacity ===
Because of the single runway and the long distance to alternate airports, it has been decided that when an approaching aircraft is nearer than halfway (around 1½ hours) from Africa to Saint Helena, no other aircraft must go towards the airport. This includes aircraft departing from Saint Helena, as they would likely head back in the case of an unforeseen problem or emergency. As a result, there can only be two landings and two departures per day (although there are in reality rarely more than a few per week).

== See also ==
- Transport on Saint Helena
- Economy of Saint Helena
