= Cledwyn Hughes, Baron Cledwyn of Penrhos =

Welsh politician (1916–2001)

The Right Honourable The Lord Cledwyn of Penrhos CH PC
- Hughes in 1965

Leader of the Opposition in the Lords Shadow Leader of the House of Lords
- In office 4 November 1982 – 18 July 1992
- Leader: Michael Foot; Neil Kinnock
- Preceded by: The Lord Peart
- Succeeded by: The Lord Richard

Minister of Agriculture, Fisheries and Food
- In office 5 April 1968 – 19 June 1970
- Monarch: Elizabeth II
- Prime Minister: Harold Wilson
- Preceded by: Fred Peart
- Succeeded by: Jim Prior

Secretary of State for Wales
- In office 5 April 1966 – 5 April 1968
- Prime Minister: Harold Wilson
- Preceded by: James Griffiths
- Succeeded by: George Thomas

Minister of State for Commonwealth Relations
- In office 16 October 1964 – 5 April 1966
- Prime Minister: Harold Wilson
- Preceded by: The Duke of Devonshire
- Succeeded by: Office abolished

Member of the House of Lords
- Lord Temporal
- Life peerage 16 July 1979 – 22 February 2001

Member of Parliament for Anglesey
- In office 25 October 1951 – 7 April 1979
- Preceded by: Megan Lloyd George
- Succeeded by: Keith Best

Personal details
- Born: 14 September 1916 Holyhead, Wales
- Died: 22 February 2001 (aged 84) Bodelwyddan, Wales
- Spouse: Jean
- Children: Ann; Harri
- Education: University of Wales, Aberystwyth

Military service
- Rank: Flight Lieutenant

Cledwyn Hughes, Baron Cledwyn of Penrhos, CH, PC (14 September 1916 – 22 February 2001) was a Welsh Labour Party politician, usually associated with the moderate wing of the party. He was also regarded, particularly in later years, as a non-political figure of stature in Wales having held posts of importance in bodies such as the University of Wales.

== Early life ==
Cledwyn Hughes was born at 13 Plashyfryd Terrace, Holyhead, the elder son of Henry David Hughes and Emma Davies (née Hughes), who was a young widow with a son, Emlyn, when she remarried in 1915.

His father, widely known as Harri Hughes, had left school at the age of twelve to work in the Dinorwic quarry, as several generations of his family had done. Aged 21, he resumed his education and entered the Calvinistic Methodist ministry, serving as the minister of Disgwylfa Chapel in Holyhead from 1915 until his death in 1947. Harri Hughes was a prominent local Liberal and a strong supporter of Lady Megan Lloyd George, who served as the Liberal MP for Anglesey from 1929.

Cledwyn Hughes was educated at the Holyhead Grammar School and at the University of Wales, Aberystwyth, where he studied Law and became president of the Liberal Society. After graduating in 1937, he returned to Holyhead, and was articled to a local solicitor. As local unemployment deepened, and the Czechoslovak crisis intensified, he listened to local Independent Labour Party speakers, and joined the Labour party in 1938. His decision was also driven by the influence of the writings of R.H. Tawney and the Left Book Club. Like Tawney, he was a Christian socialist, and believed that socialism equated with fellowship. For many years, he regularly preached on Sundays in Anglesey's chapels, even when serving as a cabinet minister.

Hughes qualified as a solicitor in 1940. During the Second World War, Hughes served in the RAFVR in an administrative role, achieving the rank of Flight Lieutenant.

== Early political career ==
In 1944, local Labour activists urged him to stand in the post-war general election against Lady Megan Lloyd George, who had served as Liberal MP for the Anglesey constituency since 1929. Despite the resistance of his father, Hughes fought the 1945 election with very little organisational support. He made 50 speeches - 45 of them in Welsh, and came within 1,081 votes of victory.

Following demobilisation in 1946, Hughes returned to Holyhead to practise as a solicitor and was appointed acting clerk to Holyhead District Council. In 1946, he became the youngest member of Anglesey County Council when he was elected to represent the Kingsland Ward in Holyhead. He remained a county councillor until 1953 and maintained good relations with the County Council throughout his time as a Member of Parliament, and had some success in bringing employment to the island.

In 1950, he challenged Lady Megan again, but she beat him by 2,000 votes. This was partly because, although a Liberal, she had identified with Labour. In 1951 general election, however, when Labour lost ground nationally, he ousted her by 595 votes.

== Early parliamentary career ==
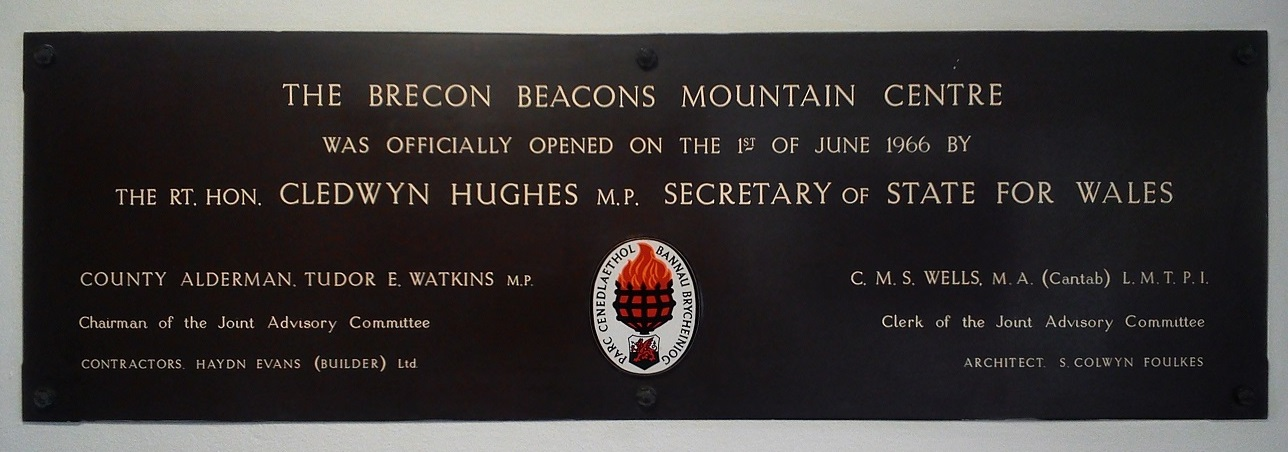
Tablet at the Brecon Beacons Mountain Centre with references to Cledwyn Hughes and Tudor Watkins

In his maiden speech on 8 November 1951, Hughes addressed a number of issues that would recur during his parliamentary career, including the deficiencies of housing on Anglesey, the case for devolution in Wales, and his concerns about the future of the Welsh language.

In his first term as MP for Anglesey, Hughes placed considerable emphasis on attracting new jobs to the island. He was acutely aware that a large proportion of the young people were obliged to leave Anglesey to look for work, and Hughes was active in the process of securing the Wylfa nuclear power station and later an aluminium smelter project to be located on the island. Such efforts contributed to an increase in his majority to 4,568 at the 1955 General Election.

During his early parliamentary career, Hughes concentrated on Welsh issues. Together with a number of other Welsh-speaking Labour MPs, he supported the Parliament for Wales Campaign. In 1955, he seconded a bill proposed by S.O. Davies in favour of such a parliament but it was supported by only fourteen members of the Commons. A national petition was launched in 1956, which resulted in his being reported to the Labour national executive by the south-Wales-dominated Welsh Council of Labour. Following the failure of this campaign, Hughes supported efforts to secure a Secretary of State for Wales and this became Labour's official policy by the 1959 General Election.

In 1957 he was appointed to the Public Accounts Committee. In the following year he conducted a month-long visit to St Helena on behalf of the Labour Party. Hughes was the first MP to visit the island since it was ceded to the British Government by the East India Company in 1843. Hughes submitted a highly critical report describing the "appalling poverty" of the island's inhabitants and assisted with the establishment of the island's first trade union. This visit established Hughes's reputation as a politician actively involved with the affairs of the Commonwealth.

In 1959, Hugh Gaitskell appointed Hughes as a shadow spokesman on housing and local government.

When Labour came to power in 1964, Hughes was appointed Minister of State for Commonwealth Relations and this turned out to be an inspired appointment which Harold Wilson considered to be "one of the Government's outstanding successes". During his two years in post Hughes was heavily involved with decolonization and represented the British Government at the independence celebrations of Malta, Kenya and the Gambia. His negotiating skills were tested by conflicts within the Commonwealth, notably in Cyprus, Malaysia and the Indian sub-continent where Hughes negotiated a cease-fire between India and Pakistan following a military conflict in the Rann of Kutch during June 1965. Hughes was also involved in the negotiations to avert a unilateral declaration of independence in Southern Rhodesia. In July 1965, he visited Salisbury for talks with Ian Smith, but these were unsuccessful and Smith declared UDI the following November.

== Secretary of State for Wales ==
In 1966, Wilson made him Secretary of State for Wales in succession to Jim Griffiths. Hughes was supported as Minister of State by George Thomas until 1967 and then by Eirene White who spoke warmly of his support and encouragement in that he allowed her to carry out her duties without undue interference.

His first months at the Welsh Office were difficult despite the fact that Labour had won 32 of the 36 Welsh constituencies. On 14 July 1966, Gwynfor Evans won the Carmarthen by-election to become the first Plaid Cymru MP leading to an upsurge in support for political nationalism, which was also reflected in the Welsh Language Society's active campaign for bilingual road tax licences. Within the Labour Party a minority of Welsh MPs and activists supported some form of devolution reminiscent of the campaign which Hughes had supported in the 1950s. At the same time many of Hughes's Labour colleagues, particularly veteran MPs in the industrial south, were fiercely opposed to any form of devolution. Hughes ended up caught between these two wings, and disappointed those who had anticipated a greater move towards devolution. In 1968 Hughes was succeeded as Secretary of State by George Thomas, whose views on the subject were fundamentally opposed to those of his predecessor.

Hughes's term of office was also deeply affected by the tragedy at Aberfan in October 1966, when a colliery spoil heap engulfed the primary school, leaving 144 dead, the vast majority of them children. Hughes immediately flew to the scene, and helped direct the rescue effort and ensure the well-being of survivors. An inquiry was set up under Lord Justice Edmund-Davies which, amongst its conclusions, stated that Lord Robens, the National Coal Board chairman, had misled Hughes in claiming that all tips were regularly inspected. Hughes described the Aberfan disaster as the darkest days of his life.

He spent much of his time developing the nascent Welsh Office, creating a new civil service structure in Wales and seeking to build the economic base. This included the opening of the Anglesey Aluminium smelter at Holyhead in his constituency. In 1967, Hughes was successful in securing that the Royal Mint be located at Llantrisant in south Wales rather than in Scotland or Durham, as argued by his cabinet colleagues William Ross and Anthony Greenwood respectively. The episode was regarded as enhancing the stature of the relatively new Welsh Office, as well as strengthening Hughes's position in the Cabinet.

== Minister for Agriculture ==
In 1968 Wilson moved Hughes to become Minister of Agriculture, Fisheries and Food. Hughes was disappointed to leave the Welsh Office, not least because he had done much preparatory work for the investiture of the Prince of Wales scheduled for 1969. This included sending a monthly letter on Welsh affairs to the Prince, then at Cambridge.

At Agriculture, Hughes replaced Fred Peart, who was strongly opposed to the Common Market. In contrast, Hughes was a supporter, and a great admirer of Roy Jenkins. Despite an early gaffe when he told Danish bacon producers that their product was "the choice of the British housewife", Hughes fared better than most Labour incumbents in this post, and set out to boost home food production with incentives for producers of cereals and red meat. He also dealt effectively with the consequences of a severe outbreak of foot and mouth disease by ensuring that the recommendations of an enquiry chaired by the Duke of Northumberland were implemented. This action prevented another major occurrence of the disease for many years. During his time as Secretary of State for Wales, Hughes had favoured extending the nascent department's powers over agriculture and health; as Minister of Agriculture, he transferred powers over agriculture in Wales to the Welsh Office.

== Later Commons career ==
The 1970 General Election in Anglesey was a difficult one for Hughes, who was heavily criticized by Plaid Cymru supporters. At the count there were unpleasant scenes.

Following Labour's defeat, Hughes was not elected to the Shadow Cabinet but kept the Agriculture portfolio. However, in 1972 he was dismissed by Wilson for voting in favour of entry into the Common Market. He remained a strong pro-European and was a vice-president of the umbrella group Britain in Europe during the 1975 referendum.

On return to office in 1974, Hughes was disappointed not to be offered a ministerial post. However he successfully challenged Ian Mikardo for the chairmanship of the Parliamentary Labour Party, and held the post throughout the parliament. His ability to nudge people into loyalty were in great demand in view of the Government's small majority.

In 1976, Wilson resigned suddenly and Hughes was tasked as chairman of the PLP with organizing the election of a successor. Hughes was close politically not only to Roy Jenkins but also to James Callaghan who he had first met in 1949 at the home of Glenys Kinnock's parents in Holyhead. Upon his election, James Callaghan recommended the appointment of Hughes as a Member of the Order of the Companions of Honour.

In March 1977, Hughes was actively involved in the negotiations that led to the Lib-Lab pact. In the autumn of the following year, when the Callaghan government did not have a majority in the Commons, Hughes persuaded the three Plaid Cymru members to support the government in return for a commitment to legislate for compensation to workers suffering from silicosis as a result of working in the slate quarrying industry.

In late 1978 he was once again despatched as an envoy to Rhodesia, seeking to accelerate the handover of power to the majority population, but as in 1965, he made little headway in persuading Ian Smith to co-operate. Hughes also failed to persuade Joshua Nkomo to give up the armed struggle.

In 1979 was hugely disappointed by the decisive referendum vote against devolution for Wales held on 1 March 1979. He did eventually participate in the 1997 campaign that led to a narrow vote in favour.

Weeks later, he stood down from his Anglesey seat and was succeeded as Labour candidate by his close ally, Elystan Morgan. However, the seat was surprisingly lost to the Conservative candidate Keith Best with a substantial swing. The result underlined the extent to which Hughes had built up a personal vote during his 29 years as MP for the constituency. Labour did not recapture the seat until 2001.

== House of Lords ==
On 16 July 1979 he was made a life peer as Baron Cledwyn of Penrhos, of Holyhead in the Isle of Anglesey. Following the death of Lord Goronwy-Roberts in July 1981, Cledwyn became Deputy Leader of the Labour Party in the House of Lords. In November 1982 he challenged Fred Peart for the role of Leader of the Opposition in the House of Lords, following dissatisfaction among leading Labour peers towards Peart's leadership. For the next decade he proved highly skilled in organizing the resources at his disposal to keep the government under scrutiny. There were only around 120 Labour peers, and a third of them were too unwell or elderly to regularly participate in debates. During this time the debates in the Lords were televised (at a time when those in the Commons were not) and this gave significant prominence to the Labour opposition in the Lords.

For most of his decade as Labour leader and, as such, a member of the Shadow Cabinet, Neil Kinnock was the leader of the Labour Party and they formed a strong working relationship. Had Labour won the 1992 General Election, Kinnock would have appointed Lord Cledwyn to a Cabinet post. Labour's defeat was a great disappointment to him, as he was unable to implement his proposals to reform the institution. The leadership passed to another Welshman, Lord Richard of Ammanford.

== Later life ==
During his later years, Lord Cledwyn took on a number of roles in Welsh public life. From 1976 until 1985 he was President of the University College of Wales, Aberystwyth. He has a building named after him at Aberystwyth, which is home to the School of Business and Management. He relinquished this post in 1985 on being appointed Pro-Chancellor of the University of Wales. Over the next decade he devoted much of his time to the University's various problems, including financial challenges. In particular, he was successful in obtaining funding from the Conservative government to allow the merger of the University College at Cardiff with the University of Wales Institute of Science and Technology to form what became Cardiff University. In 1995 he became President of the University College of North Wales, Bangor.

Another of his great interests was his involvement in campaigns for recognition of the Welsh language. Most notably, in 1980, he played a leading part in persuading William Whitelaw to change government policy and to establish a Welsh language television service. He was thus instrumental in persuading Gwynfor Evans to abandon his intention to begin a hunger strike. The new channel was launched as S4C in 1982. Most of his contributions in the House of Lords during the last decade of his life were on Welsh subjects.

== Family ==
In 1949 he married Jean Beatrice, daughter of Captain Jesse Hughes, of Holyhead. She shared both his religion and politics. Cledwyn and Jean Hughes had two children, a daughter, Ann and son, Harri. From 1955 until 1959 the family lived in London, but in 1959 decided that they move back to Anglesey where the children could be brought up in a Welsh speaking community.

Lord Cledwyn died, aged 84, at Glan Clwyd Hospital, Bodelwyddan on 22 February 2001. Following a public funeral service at Disgwylfa Chapel on 27 February, he was buried at Maeshyfryd Cemetery, Holyhead.

== Tributes and assessment ==
On learning of his death, former Prime Minister James Callaghan said that Cledwyn Hughes 'was an unfailing counsellor to me throughout my political life, and especially during my time as prime minister. Wales has lost a great man, and I mourn a true friend.'

Cledwyn Hughes was regarded primarily as an efficient administrator, but also as a person of great warmth and humour, with a considerable talent for storytelling. During the 1960s and 1970s his florid complexion was a familiar sight in the news. In Wales and beyond, he was known simply as Cledwyn.

== Sources ==
=== Books and journals ===
- Jones, J. Graham (December 1992). "The Parliament for Wales campaign, 1950-1956" (PDF). Welsh History Review. 16 (2): 207–36.
- Morgan, Kenneth O. (1981). Rebirth of a Nation. Wales 1880-1980. Cardiff: University of Wales Press. ISBN 0-19-821760-9.

=== Online ===
- "Lord Cledwyn of Penrhos". The Telegraph. UK. 23 February 2001.
- Jones, David Lewis. "Cledwyn Hughes, Baron Cledwyn of Penrhos". Dictionary of Welsh Biography. National Library of Wales.
- Morgan, Kenneth O. (2005). "Hughes, Cledwyn, Baron Cledwyn of Penrhos". Oxford Dictionary of National Biography (online ed.). Oxford University Press. doi:10.1093/ref:odnb/75422. ISBN 978-0-19-861412-8. (Subscription, Wikipedia Library access or UK public library membership required.)
- Roth, Andrew (23 February 2001). "Lord Cledwyn of Penrhos". The Guardian.

=== Hansard (Parliamentary debates) ===
- "Debate on the Address". Hansard. 493. 8 November 1951.
- "Government of Wales Bill". Hansard. 537. 4 March 1955.

=== Other ===
- Times Guide to the House of Commons, 1979

Parliament of the United Kingdom
Preceded by Megan Lloyd George	Member of Parliament for Anglesey; 1951–1979	Succeeded by Keith Best
Political offices
Preceded by The Duke of Devonshire	Minister of State for Commonwealth Relations; 1964–1966	Office abolished
Preceded by James Griffiths	Secretary of State for Wales; 1966–1968	Succeeded by George Thomas
Preceded by Fred Peart	Minister of Agriculture, Fisheries and Food; 1968–1970	Succeeded by James Prior
Preceded by Ian Mikardo	Chair of the Parliamentary Labour Party; 1974–1979	Succeeded by Fred Willey
Party political offices
Preceded by The Lord Peart	Leader of the Labour Party in the House of Lords; 1982–1992	Succeeded by The Lord Richard
Academic offices
Preceded by Ben Bowen Thomas	President of the University College of Wales Aberystwyth; 1977–1985	Succeeded by Melvyn Rosser
Preceded by Edmund Davies	Pro-Chancellor of the University of Wales; 1985–1994	Succeeded by Gareth Wiliams
