= Atlantic Star Airlines =

Former airline of the United Kingdom

- Industry: Airline Travel
- Founded: 2012
- Defunct: September 2, 2025
- Headquarters: United Kingdom
- Website: www.atlanticstarairlines.com

Atlantic Star Airlines was a British company founded by three former and present British Airways pilots. They planned to create an airline specifically to serve the British Overseas Territory of St Helena in the South Atlantic Ocean, using the island's airport, St Helena Airport, opened in 2016.

The company unsuccessfully bid for air access rights to the island from the St Helena government, subsidised by the British Department for International Development (DFID). Atlantic Star planned to operate services from London, down to the island and on to Cape Town with a Boeing 757-200 aircraft provided under a wet lease agreement.

The company was dissolved in 2025.

== History ==
Atlantic Star Airlines was incorporated as a private limited company in England & Wales on 20 November 2012. In June 2013 Atlantic Star Airlines announced that it planned to offer weekly direct flights from London to St. Helena with a fuel stop most likely at Madrid–Barajas Airport, and a weekly flight from St Helena to Cape Town.

According to Atlantic Star Airlines, any airline starting on the new St Helena route would need financial subsidies during the first years of operation while passenger numbers pick up.

In July 2015 the airline announced that negotiations to use a Titan Airways aircraft had been terminated and this will cause a delay to the proposed service.

In October 2015 Atlantic Star Airlines announced that their new leasing agreement would be with TUI fly Netherlands, who will operate a Boeing 737-800 on the route from London Gatwick Airport to St Helena, via a short fuel stop in Banjul, Gambia. The two-class configuration will offer Economy and Economy Plus seating options.

In the same month, Atlantic Star also confirmed the details of its first flight. It planned to depart in the late evening of 20 March 2016, arriving mid-morning in St Helena the following day. The aircraft will then leave St Helena around lunchtime, to arrive back at Gatwick that night. The second service will operate to a similar schedule, leaving Gatwick on 3 April to arrive in St Helena on 4 April, departing St Helena the same day to arrive at London Gatwick late that night. The dates required rescheduling due to a delay in the opening of the airport.

In October 2016 the airline trialled the use of an Avro RJ100 aircraft at St Helena.
