= Trade unions in Saint Helena =

- Primary legislation: Trade Unions and Trade Disputes Ordinance, 1959 (revised 2017)

International Labour Organization
- Saint Helena has separate territorial status but is an ILO member via the United Kingdom

Convention declaration
- Freedom of Association: 26 May 1966
- Right to Organise: 17 Jun 1966

Trade unions in Saint Helena emerged in the late 1950s in the flax industry and subsequently played a prominent role in the island's democratisation in the 1960s. The Saint Helena General Workers Union was the island's sole trade union throughout the latter half of the 20th century. In the 21st century, workers are mostly organised in the public sector in staff associations for nurses, teachers and public servants.

== History ==
In June 1958 the British Labour Party member of parliament, Cledwyn Hughes, visited the island and later reported to the Colonial Office that workers were living in "appalling poverty." At a public meeting during the visit, discussion ensued on the need for a trade union. The Saint Helena General Workers Union (SHGWU) was established on 23 July 1958 and on 22 September 1958 a strike launched at the Sandy Bay flax mill.

In 1968, proposals to sell the island's largest commercial company, Solomon and Co., to a South African firm were met with demonstrations by the SHGWU. The union was concerned that given the population's mixed heritage, sale to a South African firm would allow apartheid to emerge. In 1973, the union's membership was reported at 1,100 – at that time around 20% of the island's population.

== From 2000 ==
In 2001, the Saint Helena General Workers Union was estimated to have 700 members.

In 2013, during the construction of the Saint Helena Airport, workers went on strike over employment terms and conditions; it was reported as the first industrial action on the island in half a century.
