= Immigration Advisory Service =

UK charitable organisation

The Immigration Advisory Service was a British charity, in existence from 1993 until 2011. It was a UK organisation registered as a charity, providing direct legal assistance to refugees, asylum seekers and others needing advice and guidance around British immigration law. Founded in 1993, it closed after going into administration on 8 July 2011.

It was formed out of the former United Kingdom Immigrants Advisory Service. It was a nationwide charity with many offices throughout the UK. It derived its funding through donations as well as case funding from Legal Aid, which was means tested. In 2008, IAS lawyers succeeded in winning a number of high-profile and far-reaching cases before the Asylum and Immigration Tribunal and higher courts. In the same year, Kalvir Kaur of the IAS won the Immigration Legal Aid Lawyer of the Year Award for her work with unaccompanied minors and victims of trafficking.

As of 8 July 2011 IAS went into administration, blaming government changes to legal aid. The Legal Services Commission said "During recent stewardship activities the LSC raised concerns around financial management and claims irregularities, which prompted IAS trustees to conclude that the organisation was no longer financially viable". Major changes in legal aid for refugees and asylum seekers were made in 2007 and 2010.
