= Ascension scrub and grasslands =

Ecoregion on Ascension Island in the Atlantic Ocean

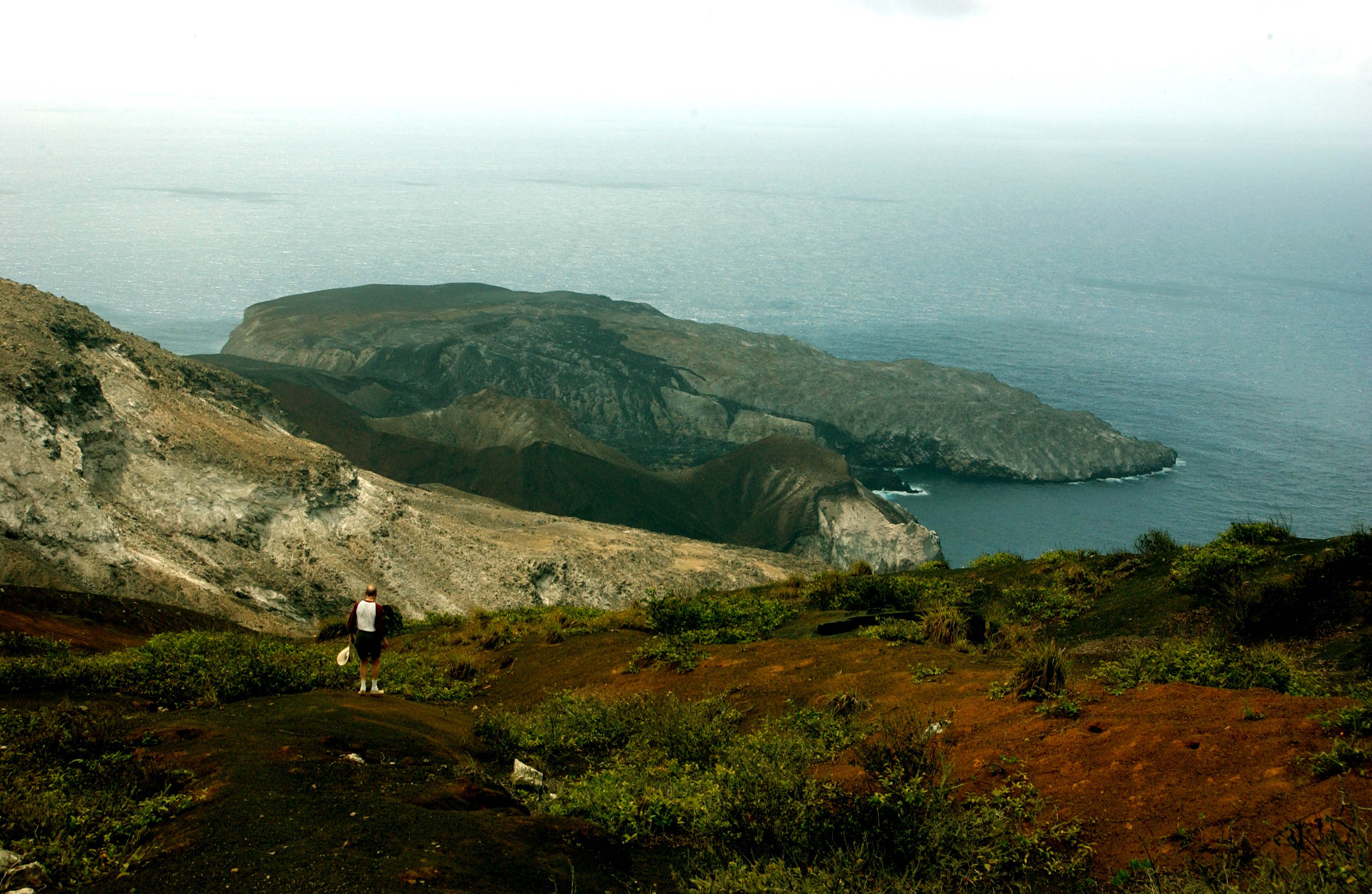
- Southeast Bay on Ascension Island

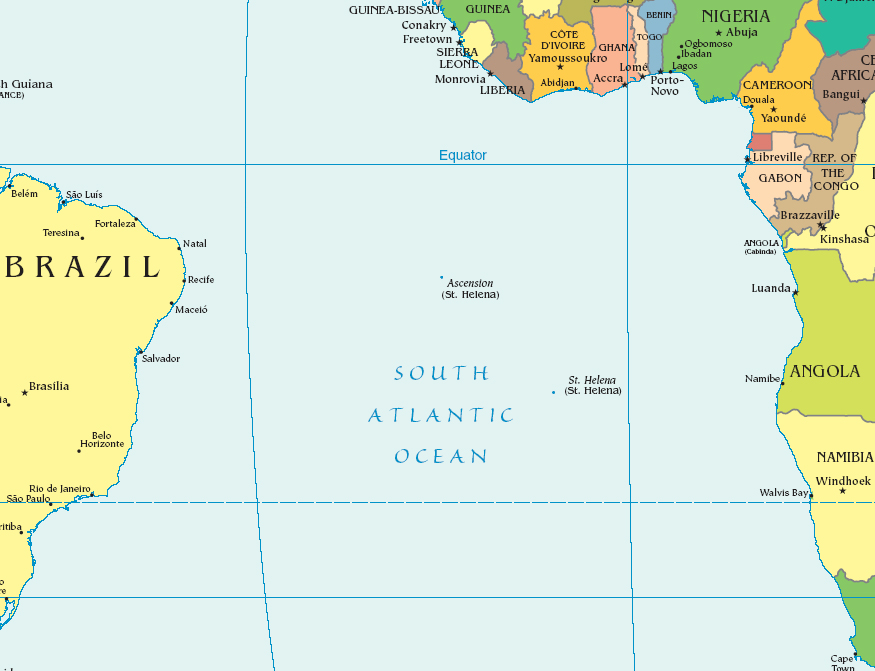
- location of Ascension Island

Ecology
- Realm: Afrotropical
- Biome: tropical and subtropical grasslands, savannas, and shrublands

Geography
- Area: 93 km^{2} (36 sq mi)
- Country: United Kingdom
- Overseas territory: Saint Helena, Ascension and Tristan da Cunha

Conservation
- Conservation status: Critical/endangered
- Protected: 0 km^{2} (0%)

The Ascension scrub and grasslands ecoregion covers the dormant volcano, Ascension Island in the Atlantic Ocean. As well as shrubs and grasses wildlife on the island includes a range of unique flora and fauna. In particular the surrounding islets are important havens for many seabirds. However the seabird populations on Ascension Island itself have been severely affected by introduced species, especially cats, which were the subject of an eradication campaign between 2002 and 2006.

== Geography ==
Map of Ascension Island

Ascension is 97 km^{2} (37 sq mi). The island lies in the South Atlantic Ocean near the equator, 1,700 km^{2} (660 sq mi) off the coast of Africa. The island is about a million years old and is volcanic in origin. Volcanic activity occurred as recently as 1000 years ago. Most of the island is covered with young volcanic soils, including lava fields and cinder deposits.

The highest peak is Green Mountain at 859 metres (2,818 ft) elevation.

Ascension has a population of approximately 900. The residents are mainly employees and their families, often on short-term contracts with the Ascension Island Government, the military (Royal Air Force and United States Air Force) and commercial operations. The majority of food and other goods are imported from the UK and South Africa. The Royal Mail Ship brings in supplies from Saint Helena on a regular basis. The USAF air service provides links with Florida and Antigua. The UK Ministry of Defence air service provides links with the Falkland Islands and the UK.

== Climate ==
Ascension Island has a subtropical semi-arid climate. Temperatures range from 10 to 32 °C (50 to 90 °F). Mean annual rainfall is 709 mm. Rain showers occur year-round, with slightly higher rainfall during the summer months (January to April). Trade winds are generally from the southeast. As moisture-bearing winds ascend Green Mountain, they cool and create orographic precipitation as both mist and rain.

== Flora ==
The natural vegetation of the island was dry grassland and scrubland, with few if any trees. Prior to human settlement the island had 25 to 30 species of plants, ten of which were endemic. Endemic species include two shrubs (Euphorbia origanoides and Oldenlandia adscensionis (possibly extinct)), two grasses (Sporobolus durus (possibly extinct) and Sporobolus caespitosus), and six ferns (Asplenium ascensionis, Marattia purpurascens, Xiphopteris ascensionense, Pteris adscensionis, and Anogramma ascensionis).

Most of the vegetation on Ascension Island today has been introduced by humans. Some of these species have spread dramatically and now occur throughout the Island. None of the remaining endemic species are common and their ranges have been reduced due to their inability to compete with the introduced species.

The Ascension Island Conservation Department are working in collaboration with the Royal Botanic Garden, Kew on an OTEP (Overseas Territories Environmental Programme) funded Endemic Plants project. Experts from the UK Overseas Territories Team at Kew advise on propagation techniques, ex-situ cultivation and the re-introduction of endangered species. Horticultural protocols for each species are to be outlined, these will be used to improve local collections and further develop ex-situ plant collections. The protocols require a lot of trial and error work to identify the most successful propagation methods for the endemic plants. Stedson Stroud has already successfully cultivated in large numbers three of the endemic species, Pteris adscensionis, Euphorbia origanoides and Sporobolus caespitosus. The clearing of invasive species on Green Mountain has created a restoration site for the reintroduction of endemic species on the mountain. The project work focuses on increasing the number of endemic species growing in cultivation and introducing these into the restoration areas.

Spurge (Euphorbia origanoides) This is the only endemic lowland plant in Ascension. It suffers from encroaching invasive vegetation as well as feeding by introduced animals. Rats seek it for moisture in its stems and roots, and insect pests also cause concern. The species is now limited to the most remote desert areas of the Island.

== Fauna ==
Ascension Island is one of the most important warm-water seabird breeding sites in the tropical Atlantic. It supports over 400,000 seabirds of 11 species. The present size of the seabird populations are only a fraction of those found before the colonisation by man in 1815 and the subsequent introduction of feral cats to the Island. The Ascension Island Conservation Department, in partnership with the RSPB began a Seabird Restoration Project in 2001. The project was implemented by the Ascension Island Government, and assisted by the RSPB with funding from the Foreign and Commonwealth Office. Feral cats were eradicated from the Island, allowing the seabirds to return to nest on the mainland. The last known feral cat was found in February 2004, since then a feral cat monitoring programme has been taking place. Since the eradication of the feral cats the nesting success rate has improved and there are more birds in an increasing number of locations.

Today the main breeding site is on nearby rat-free Boatswain Bird Island. Over 10,000 birds breed on this tiny island, which is home to white tern (Gygis alba), Ascension frigatebirds, masked booby, brown booby, red-footed booby, red-billed tropicbird and white-tailed tropicbirds (known as boatswain birds), and petrels. The sooty tern, known locally as the wideawake tern because of its distinctive call, is the most common breeding seabird on the main island, and the airport is named after it. The Ascension rail and the Ascension night heron are extinct.

Ascension frigatebird (Fregata aquilana) Of the many seabird colonising Ascension's shores, the endemic frigatebird is the most impressive. Due to predation by cats these birds are now found on Boatswainbird Island, but as feral cats have been eradicated from Ascension, it is hoped they will soon follow the other seabirds back to the main Island.

Giant pseudoscorpion (Garypus giganteus) Ascension is home to a remarkable pseudoscorpion fauna. The most impressive of these tailless scorpion-like creatures is the giant pseudoscorpion, largest of its kind. Predation by rodents and invertebrates on the mainland has limited its distribution to the very isolated Boatswainbird Island, where it lives alongside the endemic frigatebird.

Green sea turtle (Chelonia mydas) Ascension holds the second largest breeding site for the green turtle in the Atlantic. This species is dependent on sandy beaches to lay their eggs, and the beaches require regular clearing of invasive plants. Apart from the native landcrabs and endemic frigates, the hatchlings are now taken by mynas.

== Threats ==
Since its discovery in 1501 a number of plants and animals have been introduced by settlers on the island, there are no native mammals to the islands and several of the introduced species have gone feral. Cats in particular have been a threat to the seabird populations and steps are now being taken to reduce the populations of both cats and rats in order to encourage the return of breeding seabirds. Meanwhile, the Mexican thorn bush (Prosopis juliflora), another introduced species, has become a serious impediment to the breeding turtles, who lay their eggs on the beaches, and housing development on the island threatens many habitats.

Invasive species

Mexican thorn (Prosopis juliflora) This shrub was introduced to stabilise land near new buildings in Two Boats village during the 1960s. It now forms a thick shrubland in drier parts of the Island. It has completely replaced the native vegetation in these areas and threatens bird grounds as well as turtle laying beaches.

Guava (Psidium guajava) Guava is best known as a refreshing fruit; however, on Ascension the fruit it not harvested due to its acidity. Guava causes significant problems in fragile environments such as Ascension Island. This species is one of the first shrubs to cover over sparsely vegetated areas. It can tolerate both hot desert areas as well as cool moist mountain air, and forms thickets that compete with native plants for water and light.

Koster's curse (Clidemia hirta) This is one of the species that now occurs where a carpet of native and endemic ferns used to grow on Green Mountain. Along with many other introduced species it is capable of growing even in the last rocks which have so far acted as fern sanctuaries.

Common myna (Acridotheres tristis) Myna birds were introduced as a way of tackling parasites on cattle, now absent from Ascension. They are opportunistic feeders and now feed on sooty tern eggs, turtle eggs and fruits of invasive species, acting as a dispersal agent. They are also noisy and clever pests in gardens, eating fruit and vegetables.

Black rat (Rattus rattus) The black rat arrived to Ascension early in the Island's history and they are still the only species of rat here. They abound in all parts of the Island, feeding on endemic as well as introduced plants, preying on small animals and competing with land crabs.

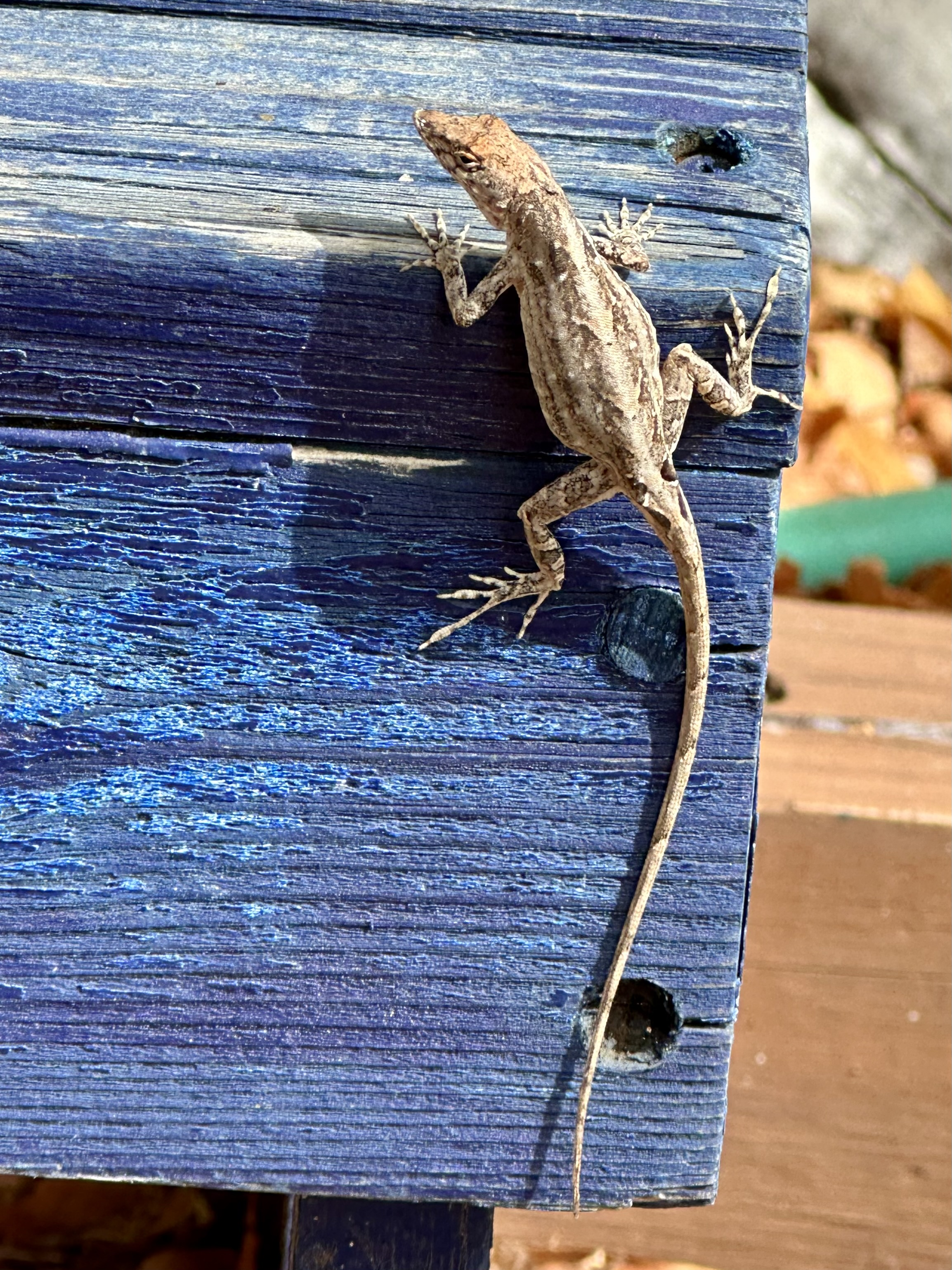
The Cuban brown anole, Anolis sagrei, is the most recent reptile species to make Ascension its home. It was officially recorded on Ascension in January 2017.

Threatened habitat - mountain vegetation The Green Mountain summit was once covered in a carpet of ferns with many endemic plants. Hardly any of this carpet now exists due to intensive efforts to increase vegetation in the mountain. Few small rocks still hold a number of endemic species, but even these areas are quickly being overwhelmed by invasive plants. Grazing animals also contribute to loss of native plants.

== See also ==
- Wildlife of Saint Helena, Ascension and Tristan da Cunha
