= Wildlife of Saint Helena, Ascension and Tristan da Cunha =

Flora and fauna of Saint Helena, Ascension and Tristan da Cunha

Saint Helena, Ascension Island and Tristan da Cunha, as well the other uninhabited islands nearby, are a haven for wildlife in the middle of the Atlantic Ocean. The islands are or were home to much endemic flora and fauna, especially invertebrates, and many endemic fish species are found in the reef ecosystems off the islands. The islands have been identified by BirdLife International as Important Bird Areas for both their endemic landbirds and breeding seabirds.

See Ascension scrub and grasslands, Saint Helena scrub and woodlands, and Tristan da Cunha–Gough Islands shrub and grasslands for more details of the World Wildlife Fund-designated ecoregions.

== Reptiles ==
There are no crocodilians or snakes on the islands. However, many sea turtles occur around the islands and breed on the beaches seasonally. Saint Helena has a small, introduced population of Asian house geckos, possibly the result of stowaways on produce shipments or cargo.

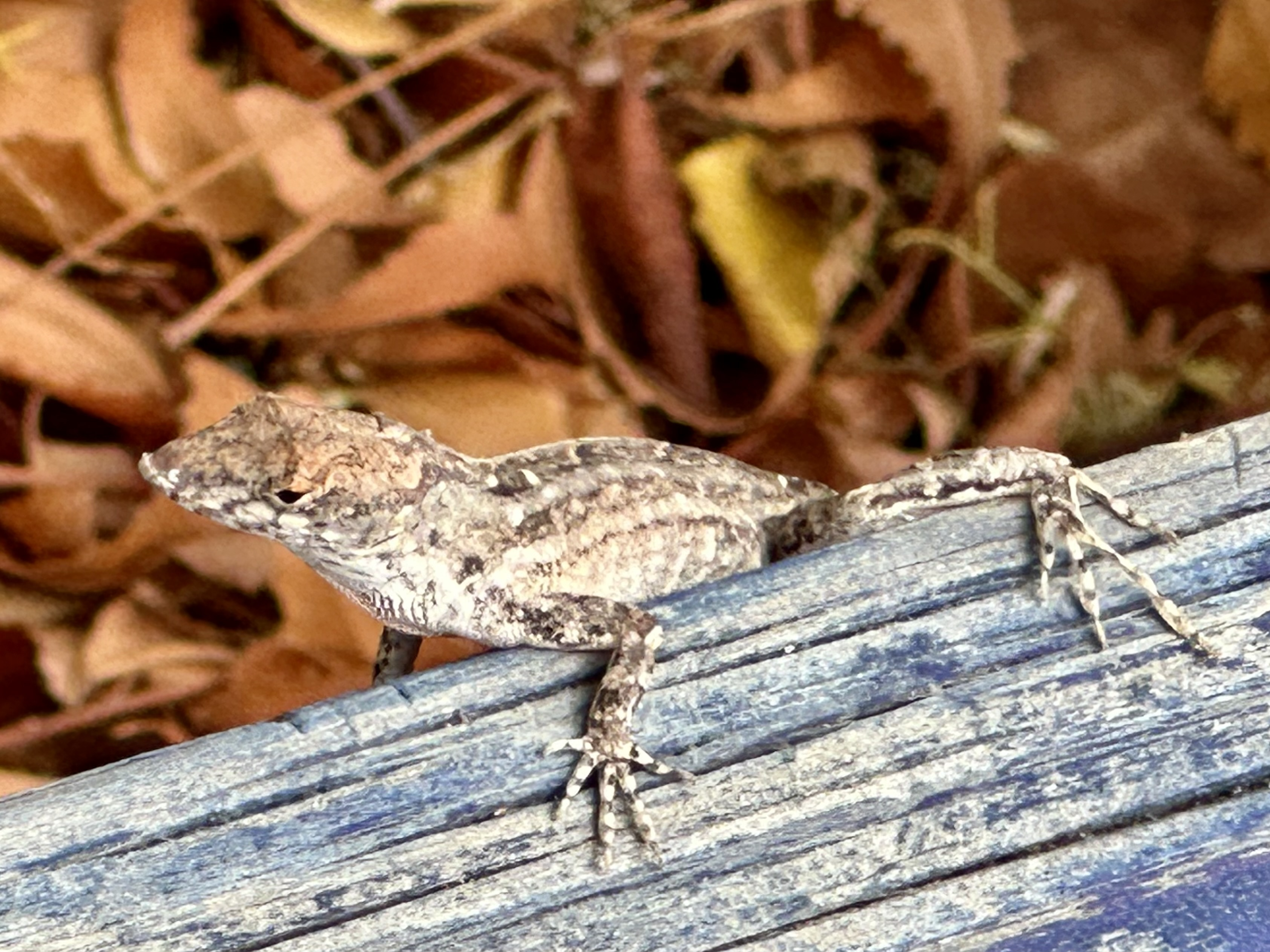
The Cuban brown anole (Anolis sagrei) was first recorded on Ascension Island in January 2017.

== Birds ==
=== Saint Helena ===
While Saint Helena is not as major of a breeding site for seabirds as Ascension is, it once had more endemic avian species prior to human discovery, all (but one) of which are now extinct; the wirebird (Charadrius sanctaehelenae) is a type of plover and is the national bird. It is called the "wirebird" due to its rather stilt-like, thin legs that look like wire. Extinct bird species on the island include both the large and small Saint Helena petrel, the Saint Helena crake, swamphen, dove, and cuckoo as well as, most famously, the St. Helena hoopoe.

=== Ascension Island ===
Ascension Island used to be home to many breeding seabirds; most are now all but extinct on the main island, and the main breeding site is on nearby rat-free Boatswain Bird Island. Over 10,000 birds breed on this tiny island, which is home to Ascension frigatebirds, red-footed, brown and masked boobies, red-billed and white-tailed tropicbirds (known as Boatswain birds), and petrels. The sooty tern, known locally as the wideawake tern because of its distinctive call, is the most common breeding seabird on the main island, and the airport is named after it. The Ascension crake and the Ascension night heron, both flightless landbirds, are now extinct. The largest native land animal is the land crab Johngarthia lagostoma (formerly Gecarcinus lagostoma).

=== Tristan da Cunha ===
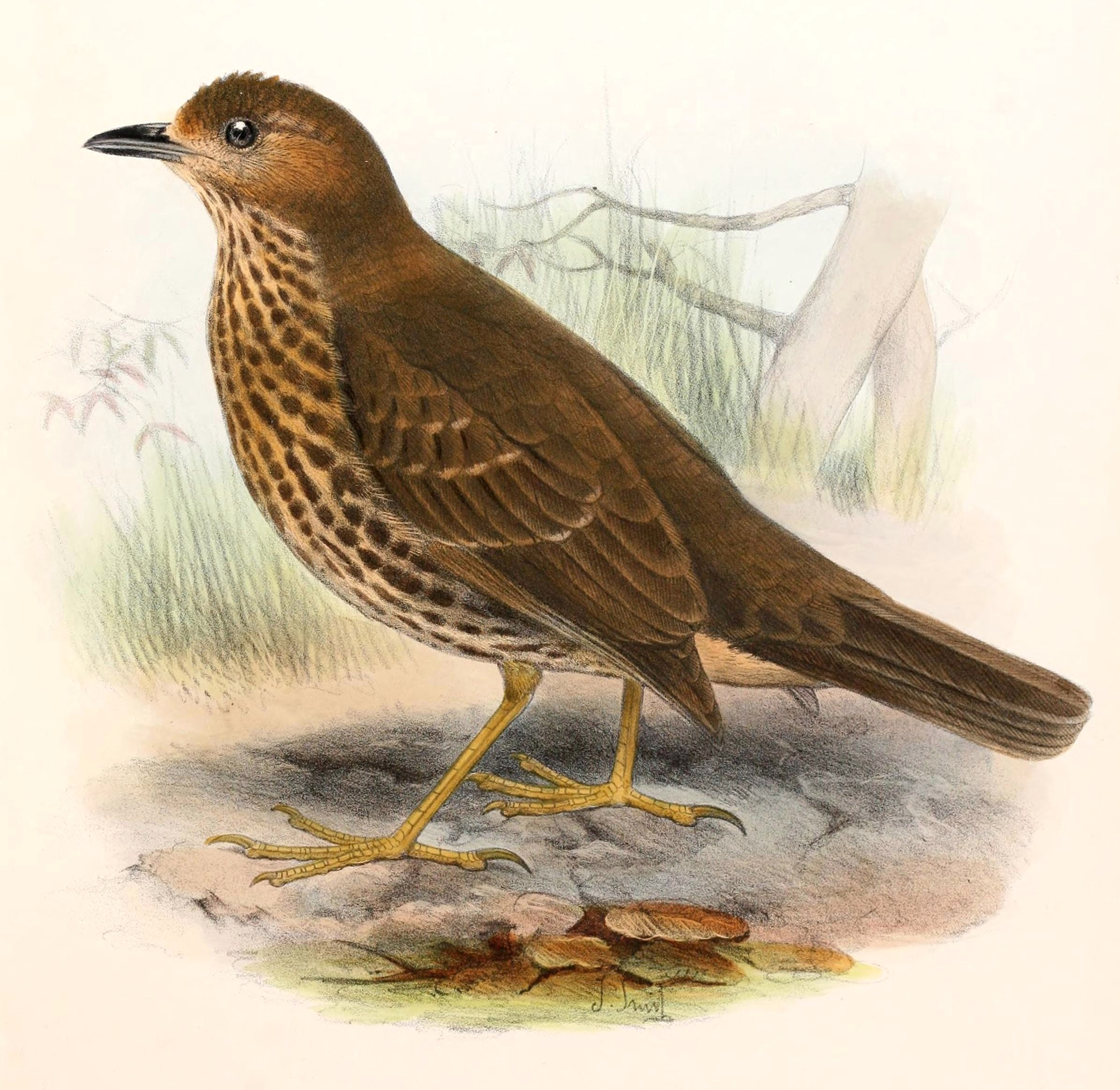
Nesocichla eremita, the Tristan thrush

Tristan da Cunha has a number of birds on par with Ascension. Inaccessible Island and Gough Island are together a UNESCO World Heritage Site and a wildlife reserve due to the large number of breeding seabirds found there, including endemics. The birds include the Tristan albatross, Atlantic yellow-nosed albatross, sooty albatross, Atlantic petrel, great-winged petrel, soft-plumaged petrel, grey petrel, broad-billed prion, Tristan skua, brown noddy, northern rockhopper penguin, great shearwater, sooty shearwater, Antarctic tern, and Tristan thrush. The Inaccessible Island rail, the world's smallest living flightless bird, is endemic to Inaccessible Island. The Tristan albatross is also native to the islands of Tristan da Cunha, as well as the Atlantic petrel. Gough Island is home to the almost flightless Gough Island moorhen and the critically endangered Gough bunting. The brown skua is the top predator of the island's ecosystem, feeding on other seabirds as well as landbirds such as the Inaccessible Island rail. However, birds of prey such as the barn owl and the Amur falcon are occasional visitors. In 1956, eight Gough moorhens were released at Sandy Point on Tristan, and have subsequently colonized the island. Patrick O'Brian, in the fourth volume of his Aubrey–Maturin series has the ornithologist Fortescue in discussion with Stephen Maturin speak of an indigenous gallinule he observed on the island.

== Mammals ==
There are no native terrestrial mammals on either Saint Helena or Ascension Island, but plentiful marine mammals, including cetaceans, such as orcas, humpback and sperm whales, and rough-toothed, bottlenose, and pantropical spotted dolphins. Over the centuries, several introduced mammals have gone feral, including domestic cats, dogs, mice, rats, and rabbits; donkeys and goats once inhabited the island, but no longer roam free. On Ascension, however, free-ranging donkeys and sheep, as well as invasive rats and mice, are still common; cats have been eliminated. Goats were, historically, introduced to Saint Helena by the Portuguese to provide passing ships with a source of fresh meat.

Tristan da Cunha is a key breeding site for subantarctic fur seals (Arctocephalus tropicalus) and southern elephant seals (Mirounga leonina); rogue leopard seals (Hydrurga leptonyx) have occasionally been sighted, as well, considerably further north from their typical Antarctic range. Feral cats were eradicated from Tristan da Cunha by 1974. The RSPB is also developing plans for the eradication of detrimental house mice from Gough Island.

== Terrestrial invertebrates ==
About 1,100 species of terrestrial invertebrates have been recorded on Saint Helena, with over 400 of these being endemic, occurring nowhere else. Prosperous Bay Plain (the site of Saint Helena Airport) is the only known habitat for about 55 of these endemic species. The Saint Helena giant earwig is almost certainly extinct, with the most recent chitinous remains having been found in the 1990s. However, its presence is firmly cemented within Saint Helena folklore, and hopes linger on.

The central peaks of Saint Helena are home to an extraordinary set of ground beetles of the tribe Bembidiini, which are strikingly morphologically different from bembidiines found elsewhere. They have been found to form a clade of genetically similar species, being related to Bembidion alsium from the Indian Ocean island of Réunion. The African Omotaphus is the sister-genera to Bembidion, suggesting that both the Saint Helena and Reunión beetles were derived from a single common ancestor, emerging from the same dispersal events from a now-extinct African lineage that was a sister to Omotaphus. All of the Saint Helena bembidiine species are threatened by habitat destruction and invasive species, with some likely to already be extinct.

The only venomous animal on Saint Helena is Isometrus maculatus, a scorpion from the family Buthidae. Restoration plans for Inaccessible Island include investigating the impact and feasibility of eradicating a known parasitic wasp, Ichneumon insulator.

== Marine life ==
Saint Helena and Ascension Island both have coral ecosystems which support many endemic and unique fish species.

=== Ascension Island ===
The following species of fish are endemic to Ascension Island:

- Resplendent pygmy angelfish (Centropyge resplendens)
- Apollo damselfish (Chromis sp.)
- Lubbock's yellowtail damselfish (Stegastes lubbocki)
- Ascension goby (Priolepis ascensionis)
- White hawkfish (Amblycirrhitus earnshawi)
- Marmalade razorfish (Xyrichtys blanchardi)
- Seabream (Diplodus sp.)
- Ascension wrasse (Thalassoma ascensionis)

=== Saint Helena and Ascension Island ===
The following species of fish are found off of both Saint Helena and Ascension Island:

- Bicolor butterflyfish (Prognathodes dichrous)
- Axillary-spot cardinalfish (Apogon axillaris)
- Parrotfish (Sparisoma strigatum)
- Hogfish Island wrasse (Bodianus insularis)

=== Saint Helena ===
The following species of fish are found only around Saint Helena:

- Saint Helena butterflyfish (Chaetodon sanctaehelenae)
- Saint Helena flounder (Bothus mellissi)
- Saint Helena pufferfish (Canthigaster sanctaehelenae)
- Saint Helena white seabream (Diplodus helenae)
- Saint Helena wrasse (Thalassoma sanctaehelenae)

Temperate-water fish are found in addition to those associated with the islands' coral ecosystems.

=== Marine reptiles ===
As mentioned under Reptiles above green sea turtles are present in the waters around the islands. Green sea turtles make a 3,000-mile (4,800 km) journey every 3–4 years from Brazil to Ascension Island to breed. They have been a protected species on the island since the mid-20th century, and lay their eggs on the pristine and quiet beaches of the island. The turtles which survive to adulthood will return to breed at the same beaches.

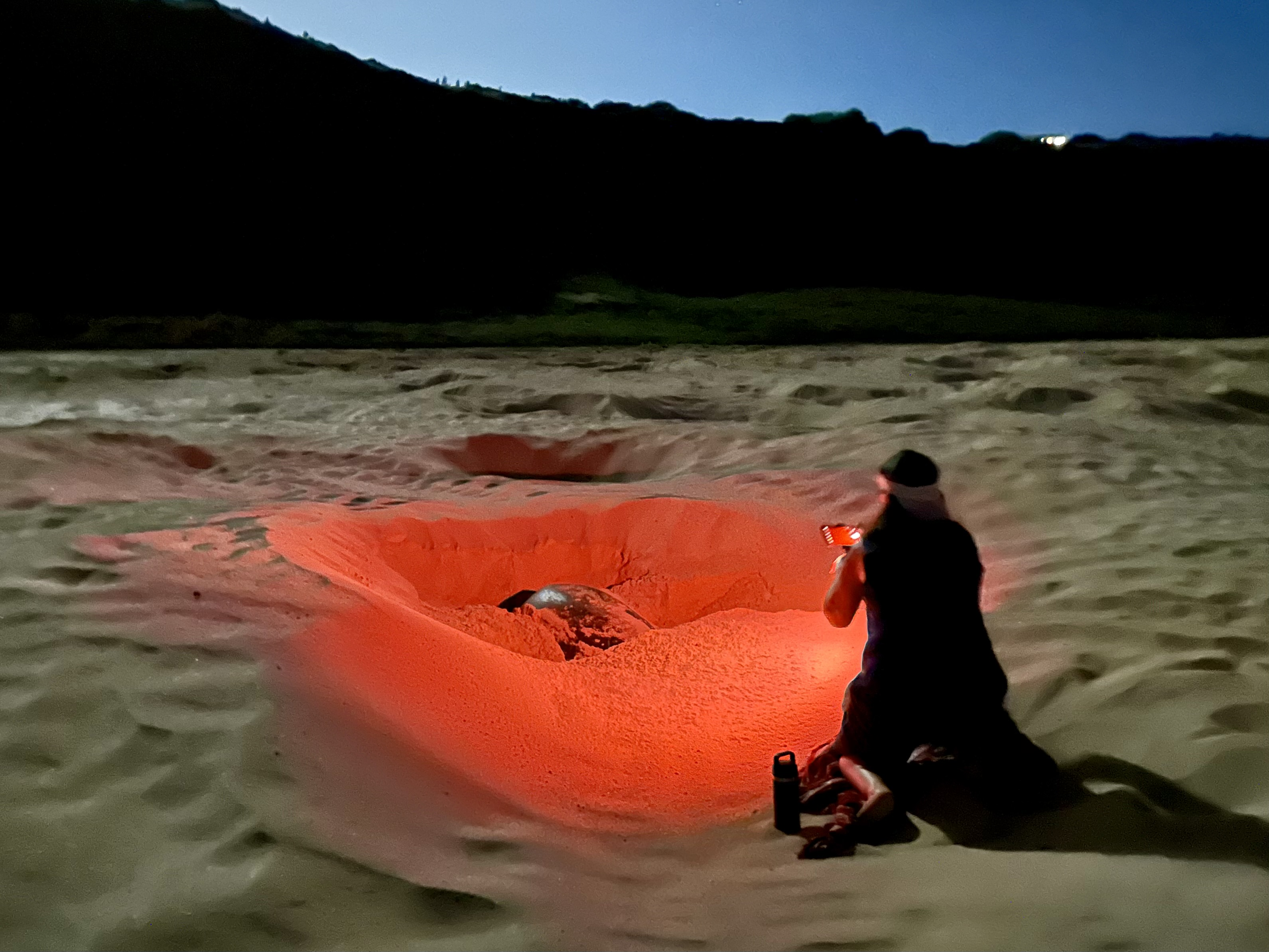
It is estimated 7,500- 30,000 turtle nests are laid on Ascensions beaches each season.

=== Marine invertebrtes ===
Within the waters surrounding Tristan da Cunha, the Tristan rock lobster is an endemic crustacean species, appearing on the territory's coat of arms.

== Flora ==
The flora of Saint Helena is particularly diverse, with hundreds of endangered endemic species. In recent years there has been a program to conserve and replant the great forest on the island, which was destroyed by human activity, causing widespread soil erosion. The Millennium Forest Project has been successful, and the forest is expanding rapidly.

There are a few plants endemic to Ascension Island also, these include the Marattia purpurascens, Asplenium ascensionis, Xiphopteris ascensionense, Pteris adscensionis, Euphorbia origanoides, and Sporobolus caespitosus. There are several other extinct species. Ascension includes large artificial forests planted over the past hundred years, mainly with introduced species, on Green Mountain. This has threatened the endemic species on the island.

The management plan for the Gough and Inaccessible Islands World Heritage Site includes actions to develop and implement a biosecurity plan for the islands. This includes steps to manage and eradicate non-native species such as an ongoing programme on Gough Island to eradicate Sagina procumbens. Eradication programs on Gough Island are ongoing and are expected to require years of "concerted effort". There is also a programme on Inaccessible Island to eradicate New Zealand flax and other invasive plants.

== Conservation ==
=== Saint Helena ===
Most of Saint Helena's endemic birds became extinct after human habitation began. Still, wirebird breeding programs are ongoing, although numbers are still falling. The Millennium Forest Project has been highly successful and has boosted the chances of Saint Helena's treasured flora and fauna, and this is the main concentration of conservation on the island.

Important Bird Areas

- North-east Saint Helena Important Bird Area
- South-west Saint Helena Important Bird Area

=== Ascension ===
Conservation has been a big issue on Ascension Island, and the Ascension Heritage Society has been set up to help deal with the issues. There have been successful programs for protecting green turtles, and the charity has worked hard with the RSPB to protect the bird life on the island. The main activities going on at the moment are a cat and rat eradication program, along with attempts to breed the native plant species on the island.

Important Bird Areas

- Ascension Island
- Boatswain Bird Island

=== Tristan da Cunha ===
Tristan da Cunha has implemented several extremely successful conservation programs, most notably, the World Heritage Sites of Inaccessible and Gough Islands. The low human population, and lack of feral cats and other predators, has helped the recovery of species on the islands.

Important Bird Areas

- Tristan da Cunha
- Inaccessible Island
- Nightingale Island
- Gough Island

=== Invasive species ===
A population of house mice is present on Tristan da Cunha. They are thought to have been accidentally introduced by 19th-century seal hunters who docked on the islands, and the mice have adapted by growing 50% larger than mainland house mice. These mice consume seabird eggs and chicks (as they nest on the ground), killing an estimated 2 million chicks annually.

== External links and sources ==
- UK Overseas Territories Conservation Forum
- The Tristan da Cunha Government official website
- Ascension Island Heritage Society
- The Official Website of the Royal Society for the Protection of Birds
- Ascension Island Administrator official website
- Ascension Conservation website
- British Geological Survey. (BGS) Ascension website
- Ascension Island Volcano Information
- Atlantic Green Turtle website
- Saint Helena Government official website
- Saint Helena Tourist office website
- Website with information on all three islands
