= Outline of Ascension Island =

British Overseas Territory in the South Atlantic Ocean

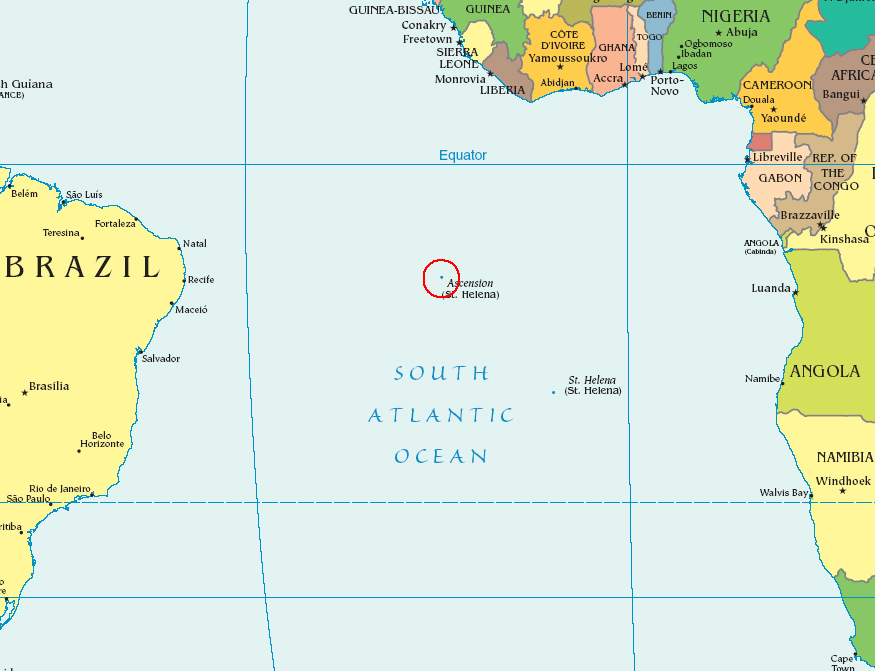
The location of Ascension Island

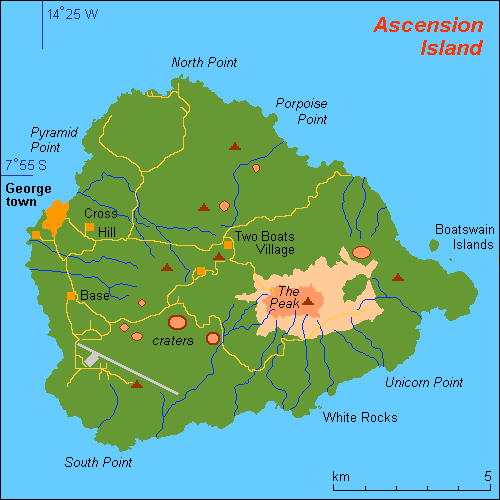
An enlargeable map of Ascension Island

The following outline is provided as an overview of and topical guide to Ascension Island:

Ascension Island is an isolated volcanic island, 7°56′ south of the Equator in the South Atlantic Ocean. It is about 960 miles (1,540 km) from the coast of Africa and 1,400 miles (2,300 km) from the coast of South America. It is governed as part of the British Overseas Territory of Saint Helena, Ascension and Tristan da Cunha, of which the main island, Saint Helena, is around 800 miles (1,300 km) to the southeast. The territory also includes the sparsely populated Tristan da Cunha archipelago, 2,000 miles (3,200 km) to the south, about halfway to the Antarctic Circle.

== General reference ==
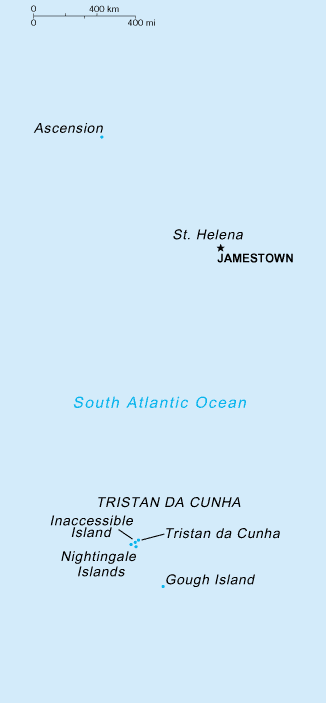
An enlargeable basic map of the British Overseas Territory of Saint Helena

- Pronunciation:
- Common English country name: Ascension Island
- Official English country name: Ascension Island
- Common endonym(s):
- Official endonym(s):
- Adjectival(s)
- Demonym(s)
- Etymology: Name of Ascension Island
- ISO region code: SH-AC
- Internet country code top-level domain: .ac

== Geography ==
Geography of Ascension Island

- Ascension Island is: an island, and a part of the British overseas territory of Saint Helena, Ascension and Tristan da Cunha
- Location: 7.56° S, 14.25° W
  - Western Hemisphere and Southern Hemisphere
  - Atlantic Ocean
    - South Atlantic (east of Brazil, midway between South America and Africa)
  - Time zone: Greenwich Mean Time (UTC+00)
  - Extreme points of Ascension Island
    - High: Green Mountain 859 m (2,818 ft)
    - Low: South Atlantic Ocean 0 m
  - Land boundaries: none
  - Coastline: South Atlantic Ocean
- Population of Ascension Island: 1,100
- Area of Ascension Island: 91 square kilometres (35 sq mi) - 222nd largest country
- Atlas of Ascension Island

=== Environment ===
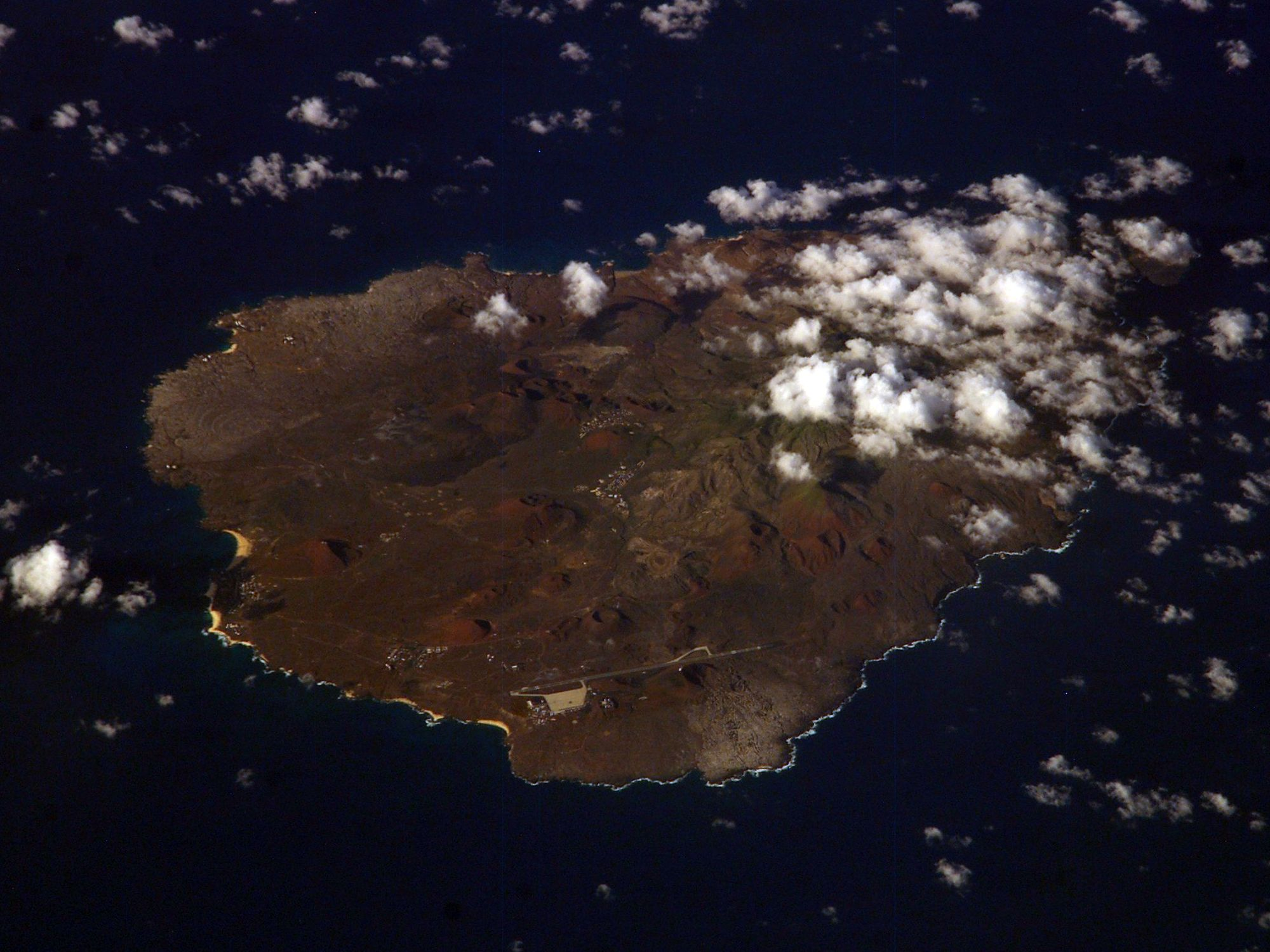
A satellite image of Ascension Island

- Climate of Ascension Island
- Environmental issues on Ascension Island
- Renewable energy in Ascension Island
- Geology of Ascension Island
- Protected areas of Ascension Island
  - Biosphere reserves in Ascension Island
  - National parks of Ascension Island
- Wildlife of Ascension Island
  - Fauna of Ascension Island
    - Birds of Ascension Island
    - Mammals of Ascension Island

==== Natural geographic features of Ascension Island ====
- Fjords of Ascension Island
- Glaciers of Ascension Island
- Islands of Ascension Island
- Lakes of Ascension Island
- Mountains of Ascension Island
  - Volcanoes in Ascension Island
- Rivers of Ascension Island
  - Waterfalls of Ascension Island
- Valleys of Ascension Island
- World Heritage Sites in Ascension Island: None

=== Regions ===
Regions of Ascension Island

==== Ecoregions ====
List of ecoregions in Ascension Island

==== Administrative divisions of Ascension Island ====
None.

=== Demography ===
Demographics of Ascension Island

== Government and politics ==
- Form of government:
- Capital of Ascension Island: Georgetown
- Elections in Ascension Island

=== Branches of government ===
Government of Ascension Island

==== Executive branch ====
- Head of state: British monarch
- Head of government: Governor of Saint Helena, Ascension and Tristan da Cunha
  - Administrator of Ascension Island

==== Legislative branch ====
- Ascension Island Council

==== Judicial branch ====
Court system of Saint Helena

- Saint Helena Supreme Court

=== Foreign relations ===
Foreign relations of Ascension Island

- Diplomatic missions in Ascension Island
- Diplomatic missions of Ascension Island

=== Law and order ===
Law of Ascension Island

- Constitution of Ascension Island
- Crime in Ascension Island
- Human rights in Ascension Island
  - LGBT rights in Ascension Island
  - Freedom of religion in Ascension Island
- Law enforcement in Ascension Island

=== Military ===
- Commander-in-Chief: Governor of Saint Helena, Ascension and Tristan da Cunha
- RAF Ascension Island (with US presence too)

=== Local government ===
Local government in Ascension Island

== History ==
History of Ascension Island

- Timeline of the history of Ascension Island
- Current events of Ascension Island
- Military history of Ascension Island

== Culture ==
Culture of Ascension Island

- Architecture of Ascension Island
- Cuisine of Ascension Island
- Festivals in Ascension Island
- Languages of Ascension Island
- Media in Ascension Island
- National symbols of Ascension Island
  - Coat of arms of Ascension Island
  - Flag of Ascension Island
  - National anthem of Ascension Island
- People of Ascension Island
- Public holidays in Ascension Island
- Records of Ascension Island
- Religion in Ascension Island
  - Christianity in Ascension Island
  - Hinduism in Ascension Island
  - Islam in Ascension Island
  - Judaism in Ascension Island
  - Sikhism in Ascension Island
- World Heritage Sites in Ascension Island: None

=== Art in Ascension Island ===
- Art in Ascension Island
- Cinema of Ascension Island
- Literature of Ascension Island
- Music of Ascension Island
- Television in Ascension Island
- Theatre in Ascension Island

=== Sports in Ascension Island ===
Sports in Ascension Island

- Football in Ascension Island
- Ascension Island at the Olympics

== Economy and infrastructure of Ascension Island ==
Economy of Ascension Island

- Economic rank, by nominal GDP (2007):
- Agriculture in Ascension Island
- Banking in Ascension Island
  - National Bank of Ascension Island
- Communications in Ascension Island
  - Internet in Ascension Island
- Companies of Ascension Island
- Currency of Ascension Island: Pound
  - ISO 4217: SHP
- Energy in Ascension Island
  - Energy in Ascension Island
  - Energy policy of Ascension Island
  - Oil industry in Ascension Island
- Health care in Ascension Island
- Mining in Ascension Island
- Tourism in Ascension Island
- Transport in Ascension Island
  - Airports in Ascension Island
  - Rail transport in Ascension Island
  - Roads in Ascension Island

== Education in Ascension Island ==
Education in Ascension Island

== See also ==
Ascension Island

- Index of Ascension Island–related articles
- List of Ascension Island-related topics
- List of international rankings
- Outline of Africa
- Outline of geography
- Outline of Saint Helena
- Outline of the United Kingdom
