= Cyperus appendiculatus =

Conservation status
- Least Concern (IUCN 3.1)

Scientific classification
- Kingdom: Plantae
- Clade: Tracheophytes
- Clade: Angiosperms
- Clade: Monocots
- Clade: Commelinids
- Order: Poales
- Family: Cyperaceae
- Genus: Cyperus
- Species: C. appendiculatus

Binomial name
- Cyperus appendiculatus (Brongn.) Kunth

Varieties
- Cyperus appendiculatus var. appendiculatus; Cyperus appendiculatus var. atlanticus (Hemsl.) Kük.; Cyperus appendiculatus var. noronhae (Ridl.) Kük.

Synonyms var. appendiculatus: Mariscus polycephalus A.Rich.; Mariscus polystachyus Brongn. ex A.Rich.; Cyperus capito Steud.; Cyperus dianae Steud.; Cyperus ligularis Hemsl.; Cyperus umbellatus Hemsl.; Cyperus appendiculatus var. gordonii Kük.; var. atlanticus: Cyperus atlanticus Hemsl.; var. noronhae: Cyperus noronhae Ridl.
- Mariscus appendiculatus Brongn.

Species of sedge

Cyperus appendiculatus is a species of sedge that is endemic to Ascension Island, Trindade and Martim Vaz, and Fernando de Noronha.

== Distribution and habitat ==
Cyperus appendiculatus is found only on Ascension Island and the Brazilian island territories of Trindade and Martim Vaz and Fernando de Noronha. On Ascension Island, it is mostly confined to the eastern side of the island, where it grows in bare, dry areas with little groundcover.

== Ecology ==
On Ascension Island, Cyperus appendiculatus grows alongside Aristida adscensionis, Euphorbia origanoides, and Portulaca oleracea.

== See also ==
- List of Cyperus species
