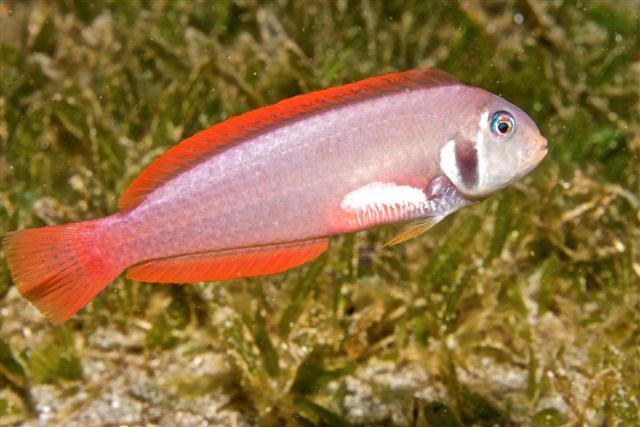
- Rosy razorfish (X. martinicensis)
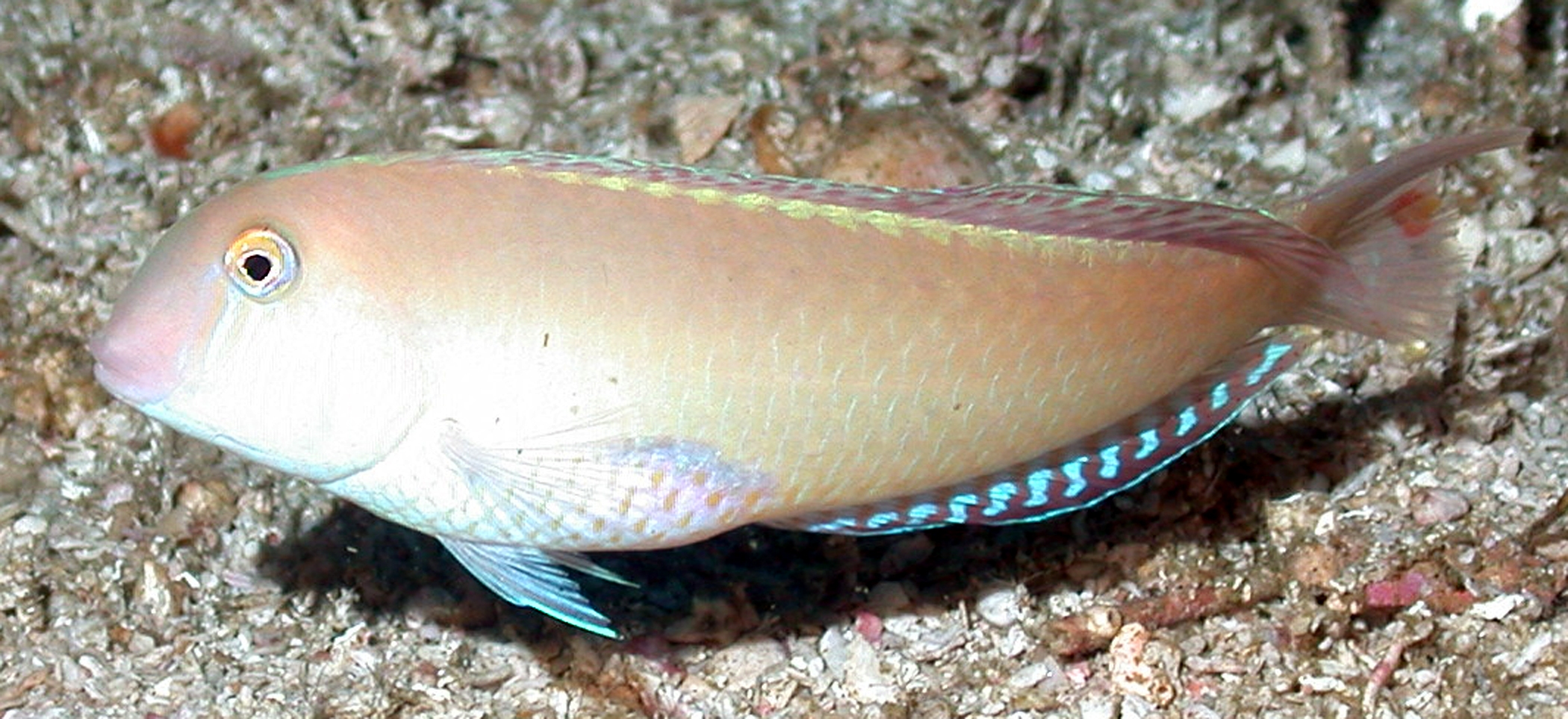
- Pearly razorfish (X. novacula)

Scientific classification
- Kingdom: Animalia
- Phylum: Chordata
- Class: Actinopterygii
- Order: Labriformes
- Family: Labridae
- Subfamily: Xyrichtyinae
- Genus: Xyrichtys; G. Cuvier, 1814

Type species
- Coryphaena novacula Linnaeus, 1758

Synonyms
- Hemipteronotus Lacépède, 1801 (suppressed in ICZN Opinion 1799); Novacula G. Cuvier, 1815; Amorphocephalus S. Bowdich, 1825; Xyrula D. S. Jordan, 1890

= Xyrichtys =

Genus of fishes

Xyrichtys is a genus of wrasses native to the Atlantic, Indian and Pacific Oceans, where they are found in sandy-bottomed habitats. They are commonly known as razorfishes, as they are very laterally compressed with a sharp bony ridge at the front of their heads. This adaptation allows them to burrow very quickly into the sand at any sign of danger.

== Species ==
The 11 currently recognized species in this genus are:

- Xyrichtys blanchardi (Cadenat & Marchal, 1963) (marmalade razorfish)
- Xyrichtys incandescens A. J. Edwards & Lubbock, 1981 (Brazilian razorfish)
- Xyrichtys javanicus (Bleeker, 1862) (Java razorfish)
- Xyrichtys martinicensis Valenciennes, 1840 (rosy razorfish)
- Xyrichtys mundiceps T. N. Gill, 1862 (Cape razorfish)
- Xyrichtys novacula (Linnaeus, 1758) (pearly razorfish)
- Xyrichtys rajagopalani Venkataramanujam, Venkataramani & Ramanathan, 1987 (Rajagopalan's razorfish)
- Xyrichtys sanctaehelenae (Günther, 1868) (yellow razorfish)
- Xyrichtys splendens Castelnau, 1855 (green razorfish)
- Xyrichtys victori Wellington, 1992 (Galapagos razorfish)
- Xyrichtys wellingtoni G. R. Allen & D. R. Robertson, 1995 (Clipperton razorfish)

== Gallery ==
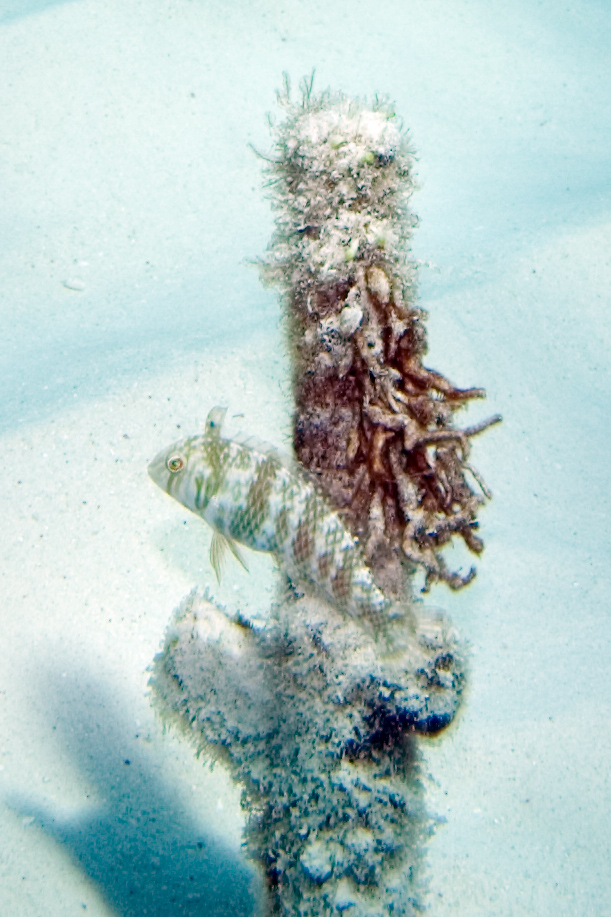
X. splendens

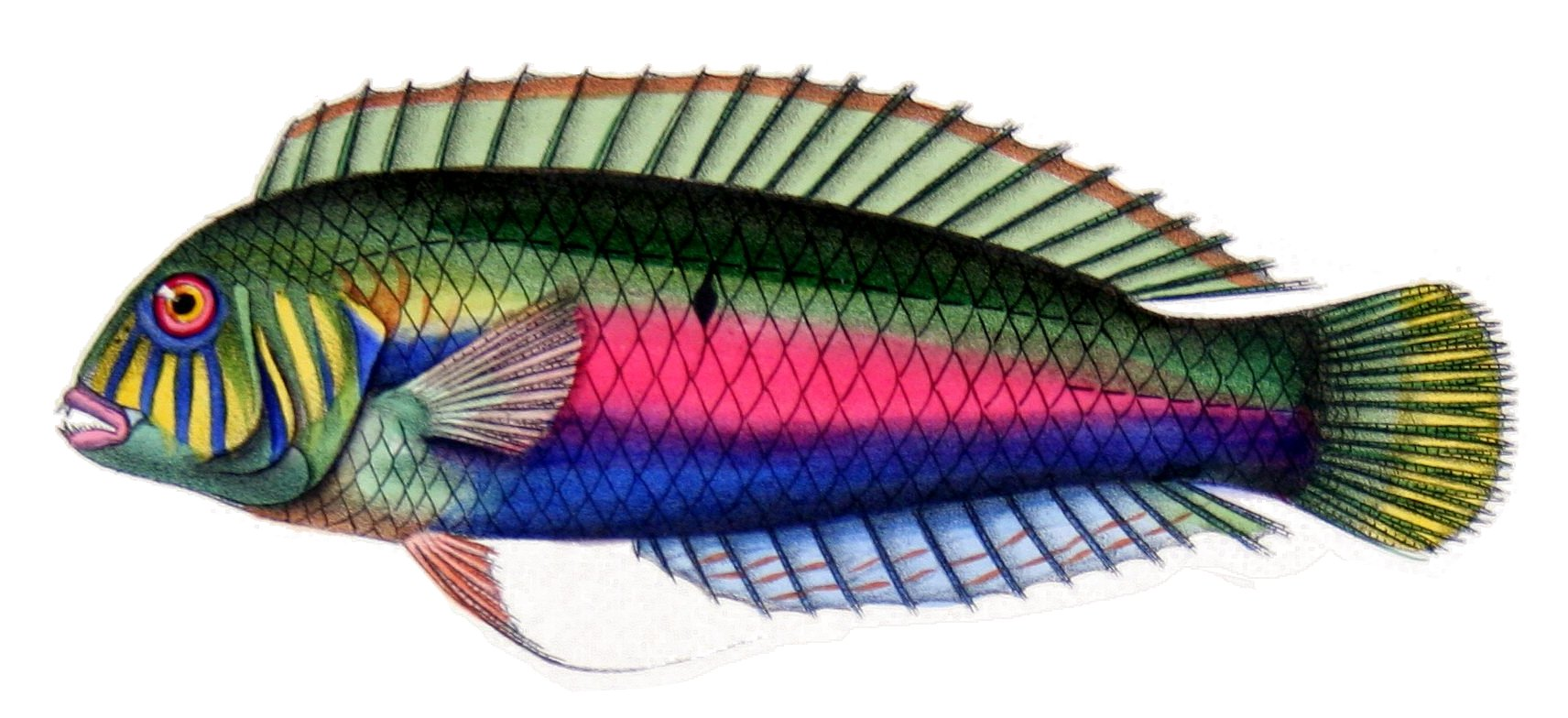
X. splendens illustration
