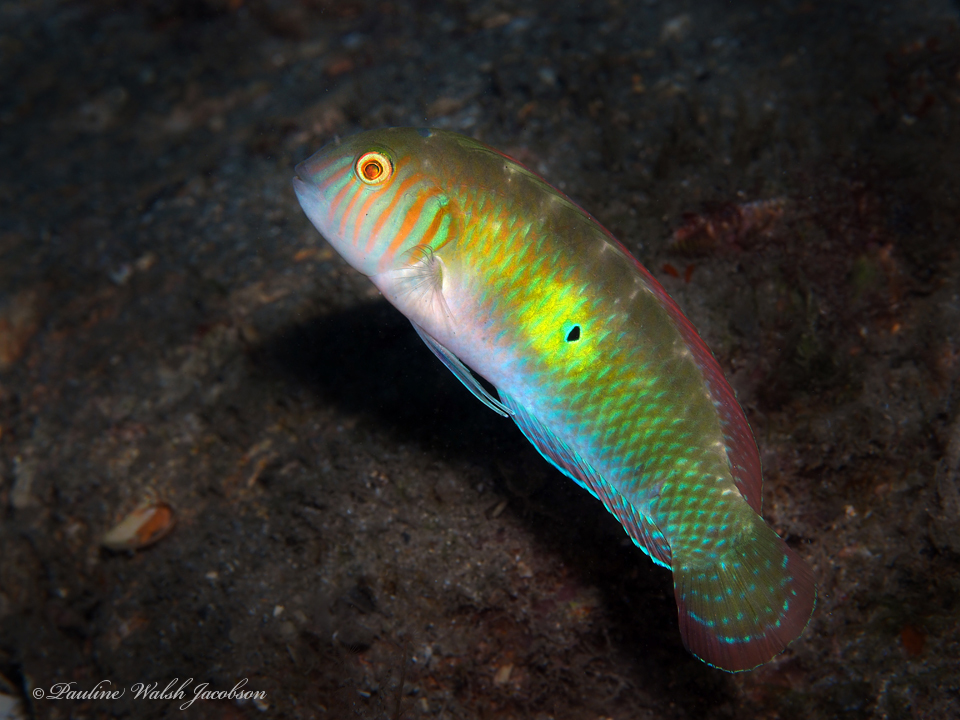

Conservation status
- Least Concern (IUCN 3.1)

Scientific classification
- Kingdom: Animalia
- Phylum: Chordata
- Class: Actinopterygii
- Order: Labriformes
- Family: Labridae
- Genus: Xyrichtys
- Species: X. splendens

Binomial name
- Xyrichtys splendens Castelnau, 1855

= Xyrichtys splendens =

Species of fish

Xyrichtys splendens, the green razorfish, is a species of marine ray-finned fish from the family Labridae, the wrasses. It is found in the western Atlantic Ocean.

== Description ==
This species reaches a length of 17.5 cm (6.9 in).

== Etymology ==
The fish's name means beautiful.
