= Xyrichtys mundiceps =

Conservation status
- Least Concern (IUCN 3.1)

Scientific classification
- Kingdom: Animalia
- Phylum: Chordata
- Class: Actinopterygii
- Order: Labriformes
- Family: Labridae
- Genus: Xyrichtys
- Species: X. mundiceps

Binomial name
- Xyrichtys mundiceps T. N. Gill, 1862

Species of fish

Xyrichtys mundiceps, the Cape razorfish, is a species of marine ray-finned fish in the family Labridae, the wrasses. It is found in the eastern-central Pacific Ocean.

== Description ==
This species reaches a length of 14.5 cm (5.7 in).

== Etymology ==
The fish is named by Gill.
