= Java razorfish =

Conservation status
- Data Deficient (IUCN 3.1)

Scientific classification
- Kingdom: Animalia
- Phylum: Chordata
- Class: Actinopterygii
- Order: Labriformes
- Family: Labridae
- Genus: Xyrichtys
- Species: X. javanicus

Binomial name
- Xyrichtys javanicus (Bleeker, 1862)

Synonyms
- Novacula javanica Bleeker, 1862; Iniistius javanicus (Bleeker, 1862)

Species of fish

The Java razorfish (Xyrichtys javanicus) is a doubtful species of wrasse about which little is known. This fish gets the name "javanicus" from Java, Indonesia, from which the type specimen was supposedly obtained. Also, some fish have been reported to have been spotted in the Red Sea, but these are considered erroneous. The validity of this species is questioned pending further studies.
