= Xyrichtys wellingtoni =

Conservation status
- Vulnerable (IUCN 3.1)

Scientific classification
- Kingdom: Animalia
- Phylum: Chordata
- Class: Actinopterygii
- Order: Labriformes
- Family: Labridae
- Genus: Xyrichtys
- Species: X. wellingtoni

Binomial name
- Xyrichtys wellingtoni G. R. Allen & D. R. Robertson, 1995

Species of fish

Xyrichtys wellingtoni, the Clipperton razorfish, is a species of marine ray-finned fish from the family Labridae, the wrasses. It is found in the eastern-central Pacific Ocean.

== Description ==
This species reaches a length of 7.2 cm (2.8 in).

== Etymology ==
The fish is named in honor of marine biologist Gerard M. Wellington of the University of Houston. It was he who assisted with the collection of the type specimens.
