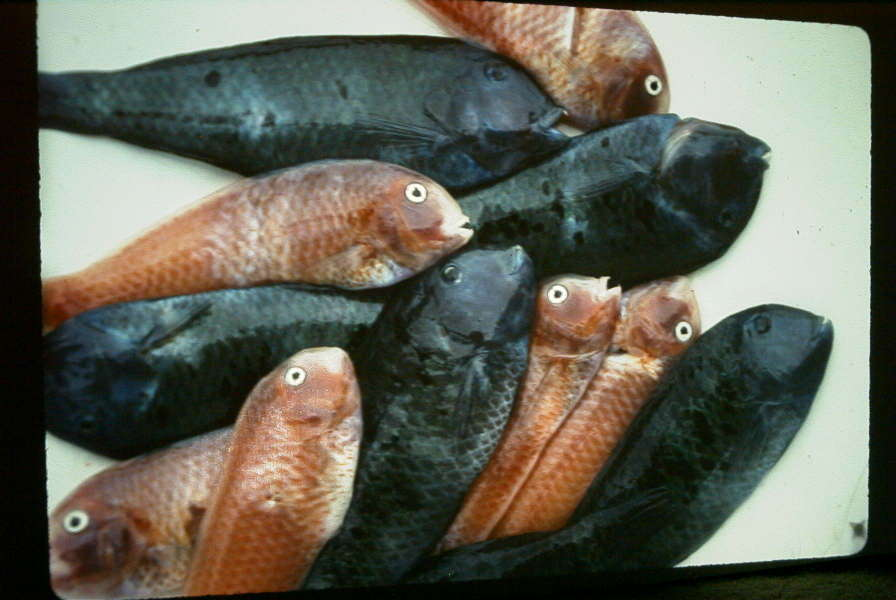

Conservation status
- Least Concern (IUCN 3.1)

Scientific classification
- Kingdom: Animalia
- Phylum: Chordata
- Class: Actinopterygii
- Order: Labriformes
- Family: Labridae
- Genus: Xyrichtys
- Species: X. victori

Binomial name
- Xyrichtys victori Wellington, 1992

= Xyrichtys victori =

Species of fish

Xyrichtys victori, the Galapagos razorfish, is a species of marine ray-finned fish in the family Labridae, the wrasses, found in the eastern Pacific Ocean.

== Description ==
This species reaches a length of 15.0 cm (5.9 in).

== Etymology ==
The fish is named in honor of Benjamin C. Victor, ichthyologist, CEO of Ocean Science Foundation. He co-discovered this species with Wellington in 1990.
