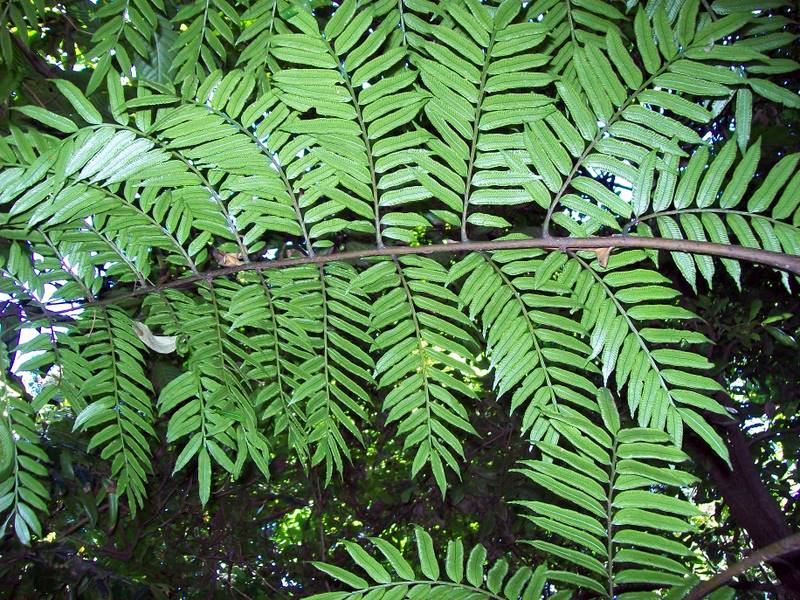

Scientific classification
- Kingdom: Plantae
- Clade: Embryophytes
- Clade: Tracheophytes
- Division: Polypodiophyta
- Class: Polypodiopsida
- Order: Marattiales
- Family: Marattiaceae
- Genus: Ptisana
- Species: P. howeana

Binomial name
- Ptisana howeana (W.R.B.Oliv.) Murdock

Synonyms
- Marattia fraxinea var. howeana W.R.B.Oliv.; Marattia howeana (W.R.B.Oliv.) P.S. Green

= Ptisana howeana =

Lord Howe Island king fern

Species of fern

Ptisana howeana is a rare fern endemic to Lord Howe Island, occasionally found in cultivation. The local names are horse shoe fern or king fern. A large plant, though not particularly tall. The fronds grow to four metres long. The habitat is near streams in dense forest at the southern part of Lord Howe Island, near Mount Lidgbird and Mount Gower.
