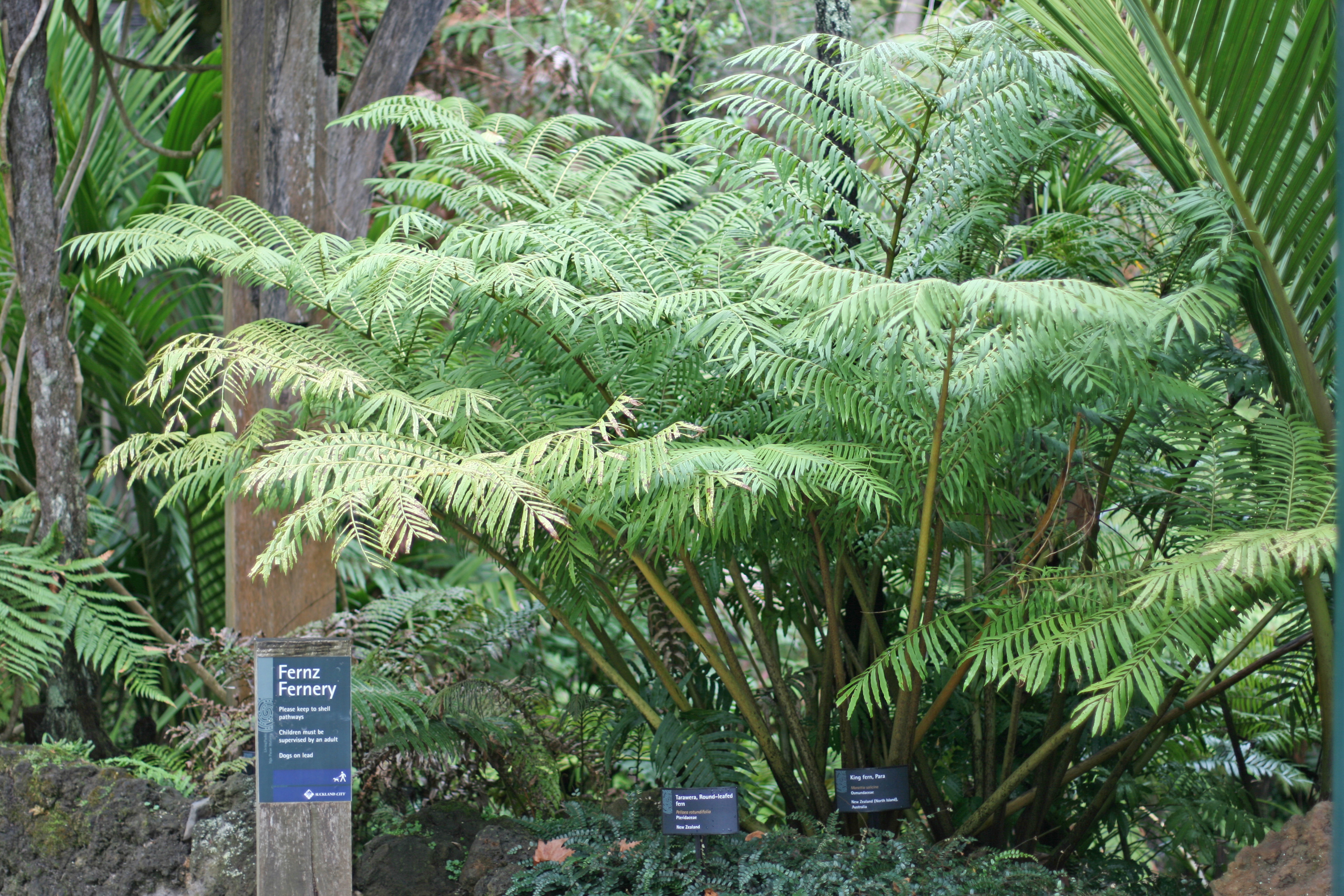
- King fern, Ptisana salicina

Scientific classification
- Kingdom: Plantae
- Clade: Tracheophytes
- Division: Polypodiophyta
- Class: Polypodiopsida
- Order: Marattiales
- Family: Marattiaceae
- Genus: Ptisana; Murdock

Type species
- Ptisana salicina (Sm.) Murdock

Species
- See text

= Ptisana =

Genus of ferns

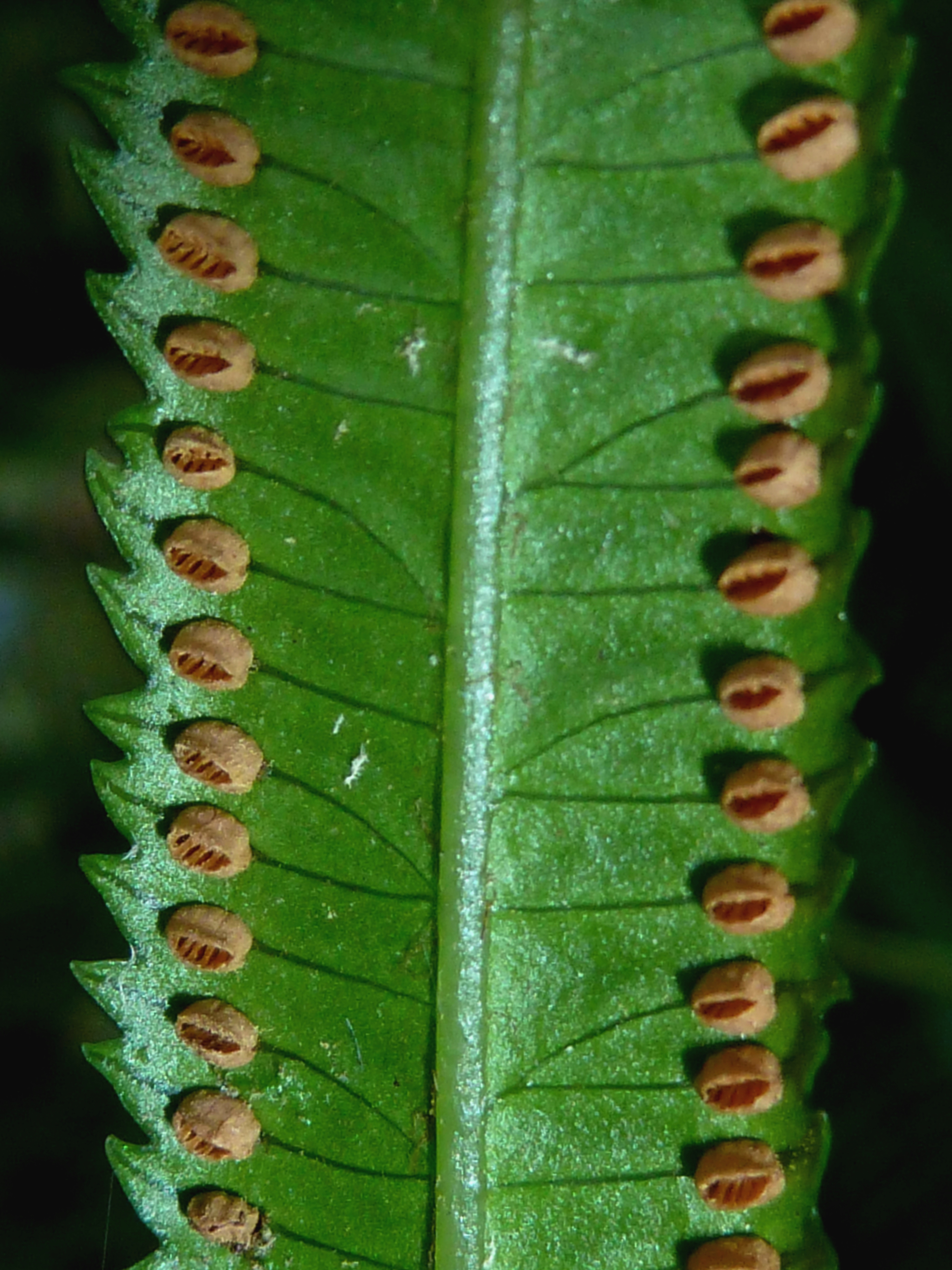
Sori of Ptisana salicifolia

Ptisana is a genus in the eusporangiate fern family Marattiaceae, comprising species historically treated in the genus Marattia. The establishment of this genus follows the 2008 work by Andrew G. Murdock, which supported recognition of this group on the basis of genetic analysis and morphology. Ptisana can be distinguished from Marattia by the presence of distinct sutures at the point of leaflet attachment, deeply cut synangia, and the absence of labiate sporangial apertures. The name Ptisana is derived from the Latin word for pearl barley, an allusion to the shape of the synangia.

Ptisana has a palaeotropical distribution, with the westernmost extreme of the range in Ascension Island and extending eastward through tropical Africa, Asia, and Oceania. Ferns in this genus are generally quite large, with fronds often reaching 2–3 meters in length; the one known exception to this is Ptisana rolandi-principis, a critically endangered dwarf species endemic to the Plateau de Dogny in New Caledonia. The basal chromosome number for Ptisana is 2n=78, whereas the one count for Marattia in the strict sense is 2n=80. The type species for the genus is Ptisana salicina, the type specimen of which was collected on Norfolk Island.

== Species ==
As of October 2026, the Checklist of Ferns and Lycophytes of the World and World Flora Online recognize 35 species in Ptisana. Plants of the World Online recognizes 38 species.

- Ptisana acuminata (Willd. ex. Kaulf.) Murdock & Perrie, formerly Ptisana attenutata (Labill.) Murdock – New Caledonia
- Ptisana africana Christenh. – East Africa
- Ptisana ambulans Murdock & C.W.Chen – Solomon Islands
- Ptisana boivinii (Mett. ex Kuhn) Senterre & Rouhan – Madagascar
- Ptisana boninensis (Nakai) Yonek. – Bonin Islands
- Ptisana costulisora (Altson) Murdock – New Guinea and nearby islands
- Ptisana decipiens Murdock & C.W.Chen – Solomon Islands
- Ptisana fraxinea (Sm.) Murdock (includes P. microcarpa comb. ined., recognized by POWO) – Africa to India, including Indian Ocean islands
- Ptisana grandifolia (Copel.) Murdock – New Guinea
- Ptisana howeana (W.R.B. Oliver) Murdock – Lord Howe Island
- Ptisana koordersii (Alderw.) Christenh. – Sulawesi
- Ptisana laboudalloniana Senterre & I.Fabre – Seychelles
- Ptisana melanesica (Kuhn) Murdock (includes P. kingii and P. werneri, recognized by POWO) – New Guinea and nearby islands
- Ptisana mertensiana (C.Presl) Murdock – Micronesia
- Ptisana novoguineensis (Rosenst.) Murdock – New Guinea
- Ptisana obesa (Christ) Murdock – New Guinea
- Ptisana odontosora (Christ) Senterre & Rouhan – Guinea
- Ptisana oreades (Domin) Murdock – northern Australia
- Ptisana paleolata (Alderw.) Govaerts & Christenh. – Sumatra
- Ptisana papuana (Alderw.) Murdock & C.W.Chen – Solomon Islands
- Ptisana pellucida (C.Presl) Murdock – Malaysia, Philippines
- Ptisana platybasis (Copel.) Murdock – New Guinea
- Ptisana purpurascens (de Vriese) Murdock – Ascension Island
- Ptisana rigida (Alderw.) Murdock – New Guinea, Sulawesi
- Ptisana robusta (Altson) Senterre & I.Fabre – São Tomé
- Ptisana rolandi-principis (Rosenst.) Christenh. – New Caledonia
- Ptisana salicifolia (Schrad.) Senterre & Rouhan (P. sorbifolia comb. ined. in POWO) – South Africa, Zimbabwe, Malawi and Mozambique
- Ptisana salicina (Sm.) Murdock – king fern; South Pacific islands, including New Guinea
- Ptisana sambucina (Blume) Murdock – Malesia and Vietnam
- Ptisana senterreana Christenh. – Cameroon, Gabon, Equatorial Guinea
- Ptisana smithii (Mett. ex Kuhn) Murdock – Vanuatu, Fiji, Samoa, Tonga
- Ptisana soluta (Compton) Murdock & Perrie – New Caledonia
- Ptisana squamosa (Christ) Murdock – New Guinea
- Ptisana sylvatica (Blume) Murdock – Malesia
- Ptisana ternatea (de Vriese) Murdock – Moluccas, New Guinea, the Philippines

== Phylogeny ==
Phylogeny of Ptisana

- - - P. fraxinea
    - P. purpurascens
  - - P. salicifolia
    - - P. oreades
      - - - P. salicina
          - P. smithii
        - - - P. attenuata
            - P. squamosa
          - - - P. rolandi-principis
              - - P. boninensis
                - - - P. papuana
                    - P. novoguineensis
                  - - P. melanesica
                    - P. sambucina
            - - P. howeana
              - - P. pellucida
                - - P. mertensiana
                  - - P. sylvatica
                    - - P. ambulans
                      - P. decipiens
