= Xyrichtys sanctaehelenae =

Conservation status
- Least Concern (IUCN 3.1)

Scientific classification
- Kingdom: Animalia
- Phylum: Chordata
- Class: Actinopterygii
- Order: Labriformes
- Family: Labridae
- Genus: Xyrichtys
- Species: X. sanctaehelenae

Binomial name
- Xyrichtys sanctaehelenae (Günther, 1868)

Synonyms
- Novacula sanctaehelenae Günther, 1868; Hemipteronotus sanctaehelenae (Günther, 1868)

Species of fish

Xyrichtys sanctaehelenae, the yellow razorfish, is a species of marine ray-finned fish from the family Labridae, the wrasses. It is found in the central Atlantic Ocean.

== Description ==
This species reaches a length of 23.3 cm (9.2 in).

== Etymology ==
The fish is named in honor of the island of St. Helens in the Atlantic.
