= Xyrichtys rajagopalani =

Conservation status
- Data Deficient (IUCN 3.1)

Scientific classification
- Kingdom: Animalia
- Phylum: Chordata
- Class: Actinopterygii
- Order: Labriformes
- Family: Labridae
- Genus: Xyrichtys
- Species: X. rajagopalani

Binomial name
- Xyrichtys rajagopalani Venkataramanujam, Venkataramani & Ramanathan, 1987

Species of fish

Xyrichtys rajagopalani, the Rajagopalan's razorfish, is a species of marine ray-finned fish from the family Labridae, the wrasses. It is found in the Indian Ocean.

== Etymology ==
The fish is named in honor of V. Rajagopalan, of the Central Marine Fisheries Research Institute in India.
