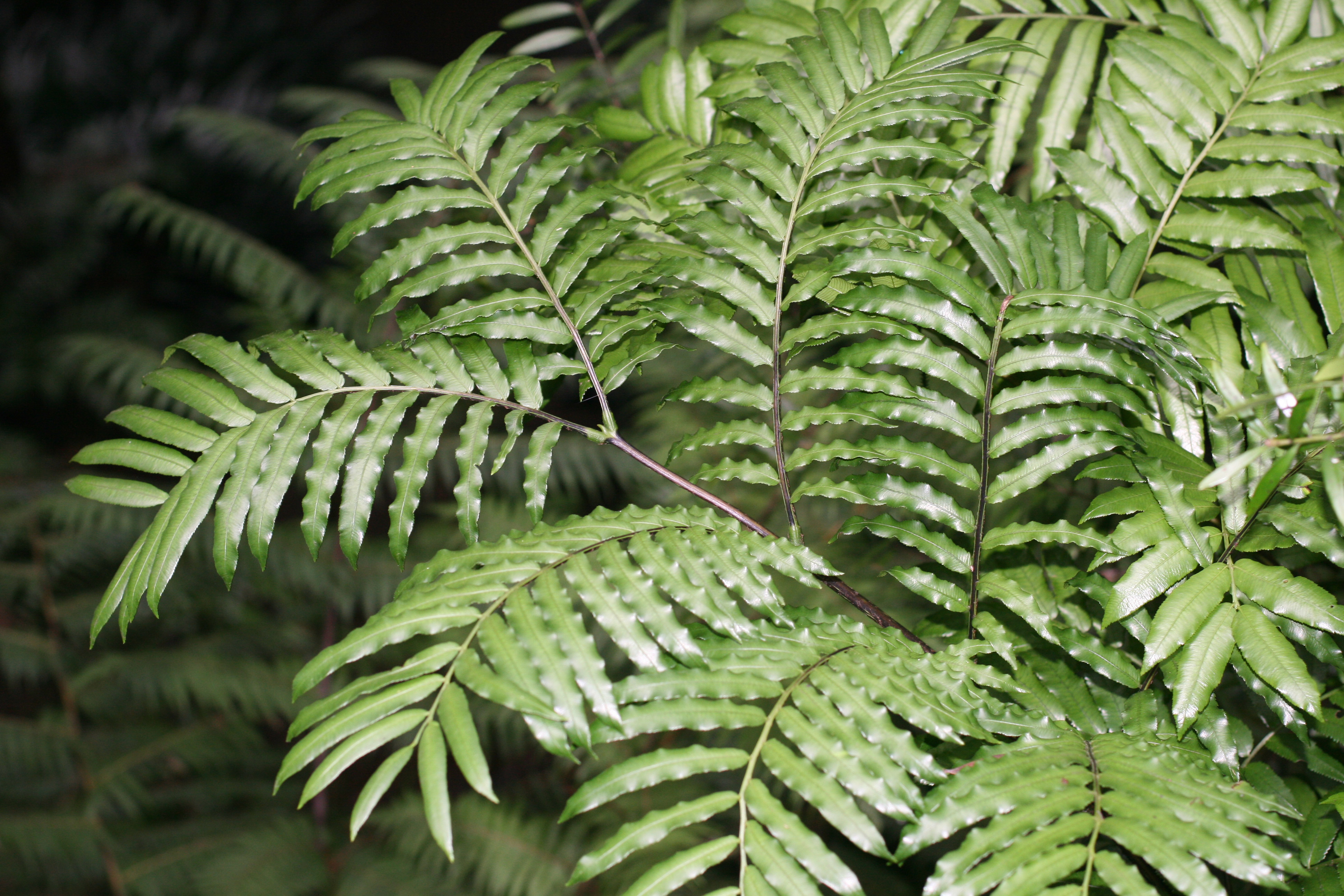

Scientific classification
- Kingdom: Plantae
- Clade: Tracheophytes
- Division: Polypodiophyta
- Class: Polypodiopsida
- Order: Marattiales
- Family: Marattiaceae
- Genus: Ptisana
- Species: P. salicina

Binomial name
- Ptisana salicina (Sm.) Murdock

Synonyms
- Marattia salicina Sm.; Marattia elegans Endl.; Marattia calliodous de Vriese; Marattia fraxinea var. salicina (Sm.) Domin; Marattia stokesii E.D.Br.; Marattia cincta Copel.; Marattia grantii Copel.

= Ptisana salicina =

Species of fern

Ptisana salicina, commonly known as para, tawhiti-para, king fern, or horseshoe fern, is a species of fern native to Norfolk Island, New Zealand and the South Pacific. It has fronds up to 5 metres (16 ft) long that arise from a starchy base that was a traditional food for the Maori.

== Distribution ==
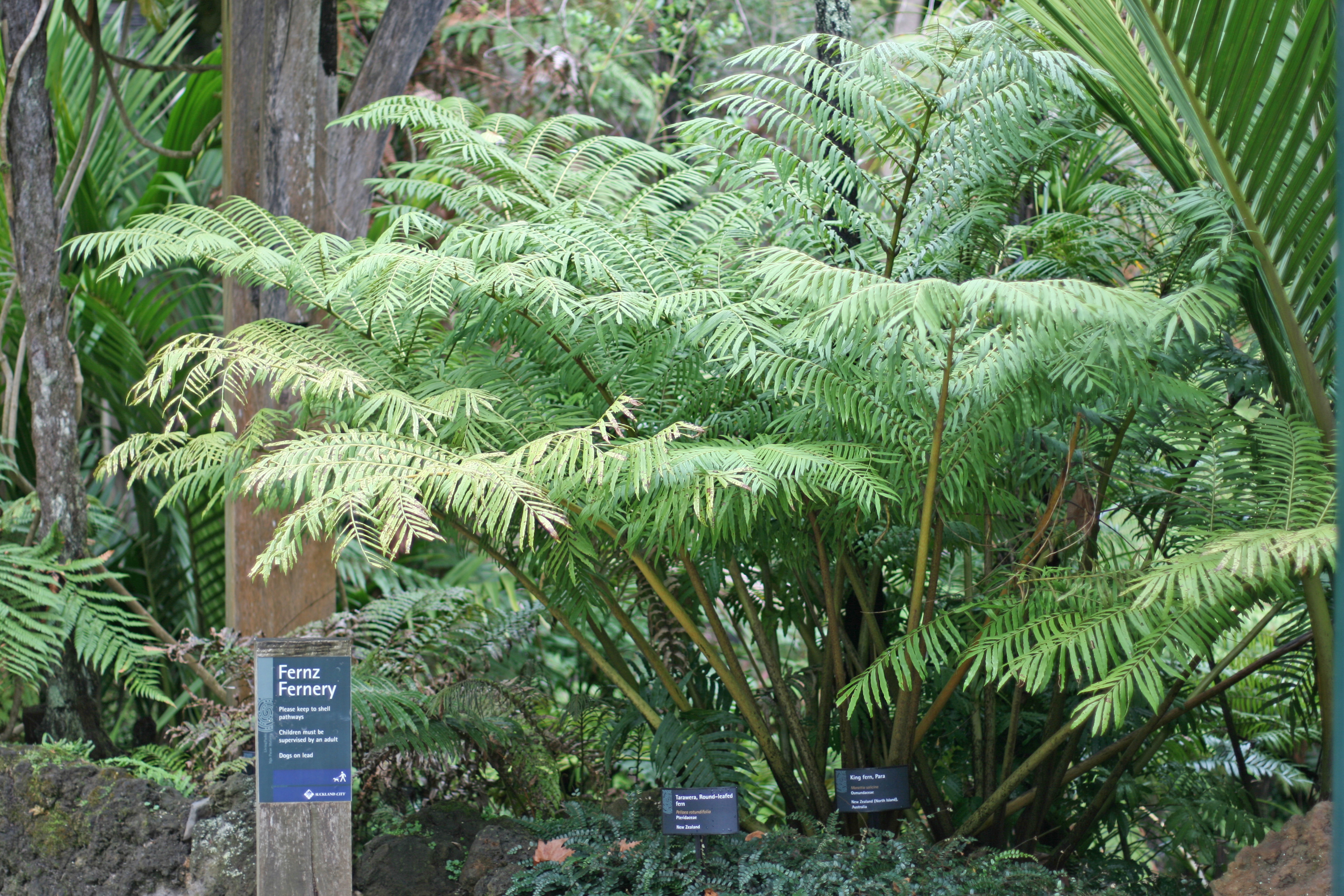
Auckland Domain

Ptisana salicina is indigenous to Norfolk Island (the type locality), New Zealand, New Caledonia, Cook Islands, Austral Islands, Society Islands and the Marquesas. It is closely related to Ptisana smithii of Vanuatu, Fiji, the Solomon Islands, Samoa and Tonga.

In New Zealand it is found in lowland areas on the north-western half of the North Island from inland Wanganui northwards. It is most abundant in the western Waikato, where it is found in forests and forest remnants. It prefers limestone-rich soils, including the entrances to caves and shady stream sides. It often grows in New Zealand association with parataniwha (Elatostema rugosum) and supplejack (Ripogonum scandens).

== Threats ==
This species is in serious decline in New Zealand, seriously threatened throughout its range by feral and domestic cattle, wild pigs and goats. Large plants no longer exist except in areas where there has been rigorous control of animals, or in inaccessible cave entrances or steep-sided gorges in karst areas. Another serious threat comes from plant collectors who are said to have wiped out several large populations in the Kawhia district.

== Description ==
The green cane-like leaf stalks are 1 to 3 metres (3 ft 3 in to 9 ft 10 in) long. The young fronds are protected as they uncoil by a large ear-shaped basal lobe at the base called a stipule. The glossy, dark green fronds are 4–5 metres (13–16 ft) long and 2 metres (6 ft 7 in) wide. The juvenile fronds are less robust, and wilt quickly if exposed to sunlight. In the Kawhia area, a distinctive form is sometimes encountered, which has crested tips on the adult leaflets. Specimens of suitable age may produce spores at any time in the year.

== Propagation ==
Propagation is difficult. It can be grown from spores, but this is extremely slow. It is sometimes offered for sale in nurseries that specialise in native plants.
