= Xyrichtys incandescens =

Conservation status
- Least Concern (IUCN 3.1)

Scientific classification
- Kingdom: Animalia
- Phylum: Chordata
- Class: Actinopterygii
- Order: Labriformes
- Family: Labridae
- Genus: Xyrichtys
- Species: X. incandescens

Binomial name
- Xyrichtys incandescens A. J. Edwards & Lubbock, 1981

Species of fish

Xyrichtys incandescens, the Brazilian razorfish, is a species of marine ray-finned fish from the family Labridae, the wrasses. It is found in the western Atlantic Ocean.

== Etymology ==
The fish's name means "glowing".
