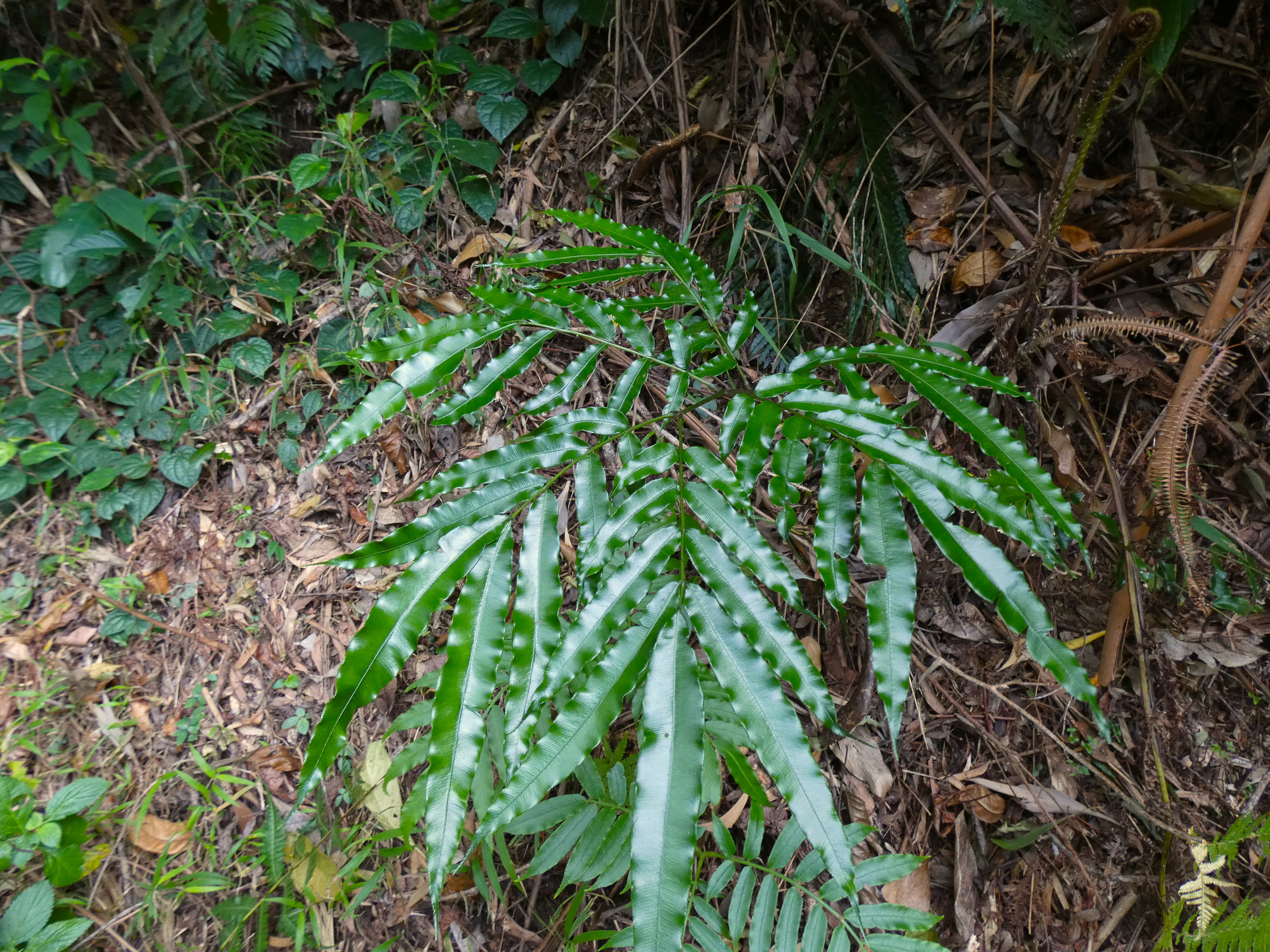

Conservation status
- Least Concern (NCA)

Scientific classification
- Kingdom: Plantae
- Clade: Embryophytes
- Clade: Tracheophytes
- Division: Polypodiophyta
- Class: Polypodiopsida
- Order: Marattiales
- Family: Marattiaceae
- Genus: Ptisana
- Species: P. oreades

Binomial name
- Ptisana oreades (Domin) Murdock

Synonyms
- Marattia oreades Domin

= Ptisana oreades =

Species of fern

Ptisana oreades is a species of fern in the family Marattiaceae. It is native to northeast Queensland, Australia.

== Description ==
This fern has a large erect rhizome reaching up to about 50 cm (20 in) high, which is obscured by accumulated stipules. The arching fronds are usually bipinnate and grow to about 4 m (13 ft) in length.

== Taxonomy ==
This species was first described in 1913 as Marattia oreades by Czech botanist Karel Domin. In 2008, botanist Andrew G. Murdock transferred it to the new genus Ptisana, retaining the species epithet oreades.

== Distribution and habitat ==
It is a terrestrial fern, and grows in rainforested areas close to water courses, from the McIlwraith Range on Cape York Peninsula south along the east coast to about the Eungella National Park west of Mackay.

== Conservation ==
This species is listed as least concern under the Queensland Government's Nature Conservation Act. As of August 2025, it has not been assessed by the International Union for Conservation of Nature.

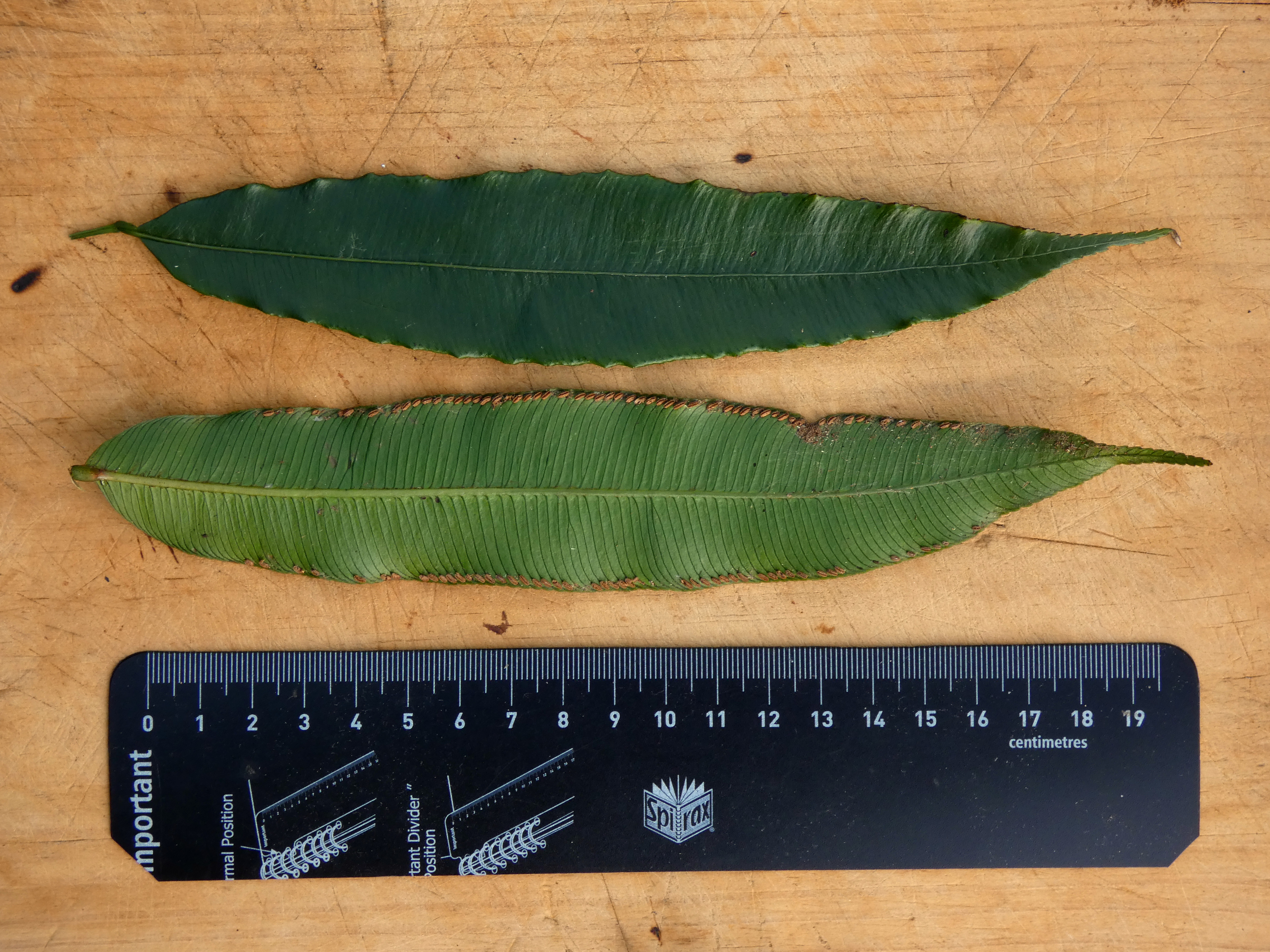
Leaflet with synangia
