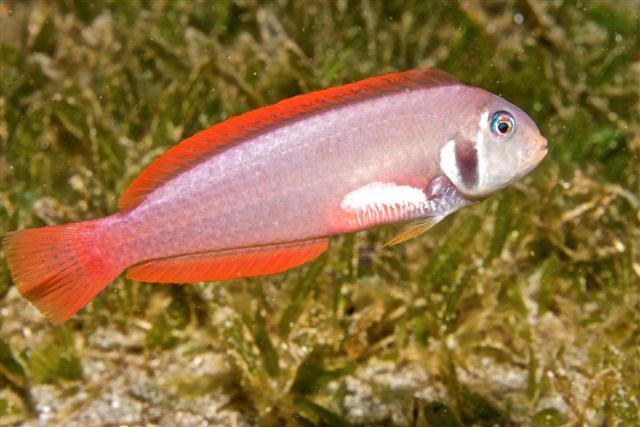

Conservation status
- Least Concern (IUCN 3.1)

Scientific classification
- Kingdom: Animalia
- Phylum: Chordata
- Class: Actinopterygii
- Order: Labriformes
- Family: Labridae
- Genus: Xyrichtys
- Species: X. martinicensis

Binomial name
- Xyrichtys martinicensis Valenciennes, 1840

= Xyrichtys martinicensis =

Rosy razorfish

Species of fish

Xyrichtys martinicensis, the rosy razorfish, is a species of marine ray-finned fish from the family Labridae, the wrasses. It is found in the western Atlantic Ocean.

== Description ==
This species reaches a length of 15.0 cm (5.9 in).

== Etymology ==
The fish is named in honor of the island of Martinique, FWI.
