= Geology of Ascension Island =

The geology of Ascension Island is the geologically young, exposed part of a large volcano, 80 kilometers west of the Mid-Atlantic Ridge. The island formed within the last six to seven million years and is primarily mafic rock with some felsic rock.

Physical map of Ascension Island

== Origins and petrology ==
Geologists debate the exact origins of the island and some have proposed that Ascension Island may overlie a diverted shallow mantle plume. Alternately, the island may have originated from anomalously enriched magma, originally at the Mid-Atlantic Ridge, but now situated to the west of it.

The petrology of Ascension is unusual. Compared to most other volcanic islands, which only have a few mafic and felsic endmembers such as basalt or rhyolite, Ascension has a full-range from some of the most mafic to most felsic. This includes basalt, hawaiite, mugearite, benmoreite, trachyte and rhyolite.

Potassium-argon dating indicates that the oldest rocks exposed above the water are one million year old rhyolites. Geologists have divided the island's mafic and felsic rocks into different named sequences and sub-divided mafic rocks based on their ratio of zirconium and niobium.

=== Sister's Peak Region ===
The Sister's Peak region in northwest Ascension has intermediate mafic lava flows, scoria cones and mafic ash fall deposits near Long Beach. The flows formed approximately 829,000 years ago and range between basalt, hawaiite and mugearite compositions. Benmoreite flows outcrop near Long Bay and west of Lady Hill. Additionally, benmoreite cinder cones are found near Broken Tooth and Hollow Tooth. The two youngest eruptions on the Island occurred in the Sisters Peak Region around 500 years ago.

=== Eastern Felsic Complex ===
The Eastern Felsic Complex (EFC), in northeastern Ascension has a ring-shape geometry with felsic flows and pyroclastic deposits. Rocks in the EFC constitute trachyte, rhyolite and formations such as lava domes and thick flows. Pyroclastics exhibit a blend of ash and pumice. These rocks formed approximately 517,000 years ago.

=== Letterbox area ===
The Devil's Inkpot lava flows formed from a fissure around the same time as the Sister's Peak region 829,000 years ago. Benmoreite scoria cones record evidence of mafic volcanism, although older rhyolite and trachyte flows, domes and pyroclastic deposits point to felsic eruptions as well.

=== Central Felsic Complex ===
The Central Felsic Complex (CFC), centers on Green Mountain and Middleton Ridge and is older than the Eastern Felsic Complex. Here, ash is typically welded together and breccia is laden with rhyolite and obsidian fragments. Middleton Ridge formed more than one million years ago and is accompanied trachyte and rhyolite flows. By comparison, Green Mountain formed as recently as 395,000 years ago with trachyte flows and pyroclastics grouped around a mafic scoria cone.

The scoria hosts pluton xenoliths.

=== Wideawakes ===
The 758,000 year old intermediate bentmoreite lava flows of southwest Ascension are interspersed with scoria cones and periodically mafic ash falls.

=== South Coast ===
The South Coast of Ascension has old, highly mafic lava flows. Bentmoreite flows are most common, although a basalt flow outcrops in Crystal Bay, a mafic scoria cone forms Ragged Hill and trachyte outcrops immediately south of the hill.
