= Xyrichtys blanchardi =

Conservation status
- Least Concern (IUCN 3.1)

Scientific classification
- Kingdom: Animalia
- Phylum: Chordata
- Class: Actinopterygii
- Order: Labriformes
- Family: Labridae
- Genus: Xyrichtys
- Species: X. blanchardi

Binomial name
- Xyrichtys blanchardi (Cadenat & Marchal, 1963)

Synonyms
- Novaculichthys blanchardi Cadenat & Marchal, 1963; Hemipteronotus blanchardi (Cadenat & Marchal, 1963)

Species of fish

Xyrichtys blanchardi, the marmalade razorfish, is a species of marine ray-finned fish from the family Labridae, the wrasses. It is found in the south-eastern Atlantic Ocean.

== Description ==
This species reaches a length of 21.2 cm (8.3 in).

== Etymology ==
The fish is named in honor of H. Blanchard, captain of the research vessel Reine-Pokou from which the type specimen was collected.
