= List of birds of Ascension Island =

This list of the bird species recorded on Ascension Island includes a total of 102 species. Ascension Island is an isolated volcanic island, south of the Equator in the South Atlantic Ocean. It is about 1,000 miles (1,600 km) from the coast of Africa and 1,400 miles (2,300 km) from the coast of South America.

This list's taxonomic treatment (designation and sequence of orders, families and species) and nomenclature (common and scientific names) follow the conventions of The Clements Checklist of Birds of the World, 2022 edition. The family accounts at the beginning of each heading reflect this taxonomy, as do the species counts found in each family account. Introduced and accidental species are included in the total counts for Ascension Island.

The following tags have been used to highlight several categories. The commonly occurring native species do not fall into any of these categories.

- (A) Accidental - a species that rarely or accidentally occurs on Ascension Island.
- (E) Endemic - a species endemic to Ascension Island.

== Guineafowl ==
Order: Galliformes Family: Numididae

Guineafowl are a group of African, seed-eating, ground-nesting birds that resemble partridges, but with featherless heads and spangled grey plumage.

- Helmeted guineafowl, Numida meleagris (A)

== Pheasants, grouse, and allies ==
Order: Galliformes Family: Phasianidae

The Phasianidae are a family of terrestrial birds which consists of quails, partridges, snowcocks, francolins, spurfowls, tragopans, monals, pheasants, peafowls and jungle fowls. In general, they are plump (although they vary in size) and have broad, relatively short wings.

- Ring-necked pheasant, Phasianus colchicus (I)
- Red junglefowl, Campocolinus coqui (I)
- Common quail, Coturnix coturnix (A)
- Red-necked francolin, Pternistis afer (I)

== Pigeons and doves ==
Order: Columbiformes Family: Columbidae

Pigeons and doves are stout-bodied birds with short necks and short slender bills with a fleshy cere.

- Rock pigeon, Columba livia (I)
- Zebra dove, Geopelia striata

== Cuckoos ==
Order: Cuculiformes Family: Cuculidae

The family Cuculidae includes cuckoos, roadrunners, and anis. These birds are of variable size with slender bodies, long tails, and strong legs. The Old World cuckoos are brood parasites.

- St. Helena cuckoo, Nannococcyx psix extinct
- Common cuckoo, Cuculus canorus (A)

== Nightjars and allies ==
Order: Caprimulgiformes Family: Caprimulgidae

Nightjars are medium-sized nocturnal birds that usually nest on the ground. They have long wings, short legs and very short bills. Most have small feet, of little use for walking, and long pointed wings. Their soft plumage is camouflaged to resemble bark or leaves.

- Eurasian nightjar, Caprimulgus europaeus (A)

== Swifts ==
Order: Caprimulgiformes Family: Apodidae

Swifts are small birds which spend the majority of their lives flying. These birds have very short legs and never settle voluntarily on the ground, perching instead only on vertical surfaces. Many swifts have long swept-back wings which resemble a crescent or boomerang.

- Common swift, Apus apus (A)
- Little swift, Apus affinis (A)

== Rails, gallinules, and coots ==
Order: Gruiformes Family: Rallidae

Rallidae is a large family of small to medium-sized birds which includes the rails, crakes, coots and gallinules. Typically they inhabit dense vegetation in damp environments near lakes, swamps or rivers. In general they are shy and secretive birds, making them difficult to observe. Most species have strong legs and long toes which are well adapted to soft uneven surfaces. They tend to have short, rounded wings and to be weak fliers.

- Corn crake, Crex crex
- Ascension crake, Mundia elpenor (E) extinct
- Eurasian moorhen, Gallinula chloropus
- Allen's gallinule, Porphyrio alleni (A)
- Purple gallinule, Porphyrio martinica (A)

== Oystercatchers ==
Order: Charadriiformes Family: Haematopodidae

The oystercatchers are large and noisy plover-like birds, with strong bills used for smashing or prising open molluscs.

- Eurasian oystercatcher, Haematopus ostralegus (A)

== Plovers and lapwings ==
Order: Charadriiformes Family: Charadriidae

The family Charadriidae includes the plovers, dotterels, and lapwings. They are small to medium-sized birds with compact bodies, short thick necks, and long, usually pointed, wings. They are found in open country worldwide, mostly in habitats near water.

- Black-bellied plover, Pluvialis squatarola (A)
- Greater sand-plover, Charadrius leschenaultii (A)
- Common ringed plover, Charadrius hiaticula (A)

== Sandpipers and allies ==
Order: Charadriiformes Family: Scolopacidae

Scolopacidae is a large diverse family of small to medium-sized shorebirds including the sandpipers, curlews, godwits, shanks, tattlers, woodcocks, snipes, dowitchers and phalaropes. The majority of these species eat small invertebrates picked out of the mud or soil. Variation in length of legs and bills enables multiple species to feed in the same habitat, particularly on the coast, without direct competition for food.

- Upland sandpiper, Bartramia longicauda (A)
- Whimbrel, Numenius phaeopus (A)
- Bar-tailed godwit, Limosa lapponica (A)
- Ruddy turnstone, Arenaria interpres (A)
- Sanderling, Calidris alba (A)
- Little stint, Calidris minuta (A)
- Semipalmated sandpiper, Calidris pusilla (A)
- Common sandpiper, Actitis hypoleucos (A)
- Spotted redshank, Tringa erythropus (A)
- Common greenshank, Tringa nebularia (A)
- Wood sandpiper, Tringa glareola (A)
- Common redshank, Tringa totanus (A)

== Skuas and jaegers ==
Order: Charadriiformes Family: Stercorariidae

The family Stercorariidae are, in general, medium to large birds, typically with grey or brown plumage, often with white markings on the wings. They nest on the ground in temperate and arctic regions and are long-distance migrants.

- South polar skua, Stercorarius maccormicki (A)
- Pomarine jaeger, Stercorarius pomarinus (A)
- Parasitic jaeger, Stercorarius parasiticus (A)
- Long-tailed jaeger, Stercorarius longicaudus (A)

== Gulls, terns, and skimmers ==
Order: Charadriiformes Family: Laridae

Laridae is a family of medium to large seabirds, the gulls, terns, and skimmers. Gulls are typically grey or white, often with black markings on the head or wings. They have stout, longish bills and webbed feet. Terns are a group of generally medium to large seabirds typically with grey or white plumage, often with black markings on the head. Most terns hunt fish by diving but some pick insects off the surface of fresh water. Terns are generally long-lived birds, with several species known to live in excess of 30 years.

- Kelp gull, Larus dominicanus (A)
- Brown noddy, Anous stolidus
- Black noddy, Anous minutus
- Lesser noddy, Anous tenuirostris
- White tern, Gygis alba
- Sooty tern, Onychoprion fuscatus
- Arctic tern, Sterna paradisaea (A)
- Antarctic tern, Sterna vittata

== Tropicbirds ==
Order: Pelecaniformes Family: Phaethontidae

Tropicbirds are slender white birds of tropical oceans, with exceptionally long central tail feathers. Their heads and long wings have black markings.

- White-tailed tropicbird, Phaethon lepturus
- Red-billed tropicbird, Phaethon aethereus

== Southern storm-petrels ==
Order: Procellariiformes Family: Oceanitidae

The southern storm-petrels are relatives of the petrels and are the smallest seabirds. They feed on planktonic crustaceans and small fish picked from the surface, typically while hovering. The flight is fluttering and sometimes bat-like.

- Wilson's storm-petrel, Oceanites oceanicus (A)
- White-bellied storm-petrel, Fregetta grallaria (A)
- Black-bellied storm-petrel, Fregetta tropica (A)

== Northern storm-petrels ==
Order: Procellariiformes Family: Hydrobatidae

Though the members of this family are similar in many respects to the southern storm-petrels, including their general appearance and habits, there are enough genetic differences to warrant their placement in a separate family.

- Leach's storm-petrel, Hydrobates leucorhous (A)
- Band-rumped storm-petrel, Hydrobates castro

== Shearwaters and petrels ==
Order: Procellariiformes Family: Procellariidae

The procellariids are the main group of medium-sized "true petrels", characterised by united nostrils with medium septum and a long outer functional primary.

- Trindade petrel, Pterodroma arminjoniana (A)
- Bulwer's petrel, Bulweria bulwerii (A)
- Cory's shearwater, Calonectris diomedea
- Great shearwater, Ardenna gravis (A)
- Sooty shearwater, Ardenna grisea (A)
- Subantarctic shearwater, Puffinus elegans (A)
- Tropical shearwater, Puffinus bailloni (A)

== Storks ==
Order: Ciconiiformes Family: Ciconiidae

Storks are large, long-legged, long-necked, wading birds with long, stout bills. Storks are mute, but bill-clattering is an important mode of communication at the nest. Their nests can be large and may be reused for many years. Many species are migratory.

- White stork, Ciconia ciconia (A)

== Frigatebirds ==
Order: Suliformes Family: Fregatidae

Frigatebirds are large seabirds usually found over tropical oceans. They are large, black-and-white, or completely black, with long wings and deeply forked tails. The males have colored inflatable throat pouches. They do not swim or walk and cannot take off from a flat surface. Having the largest wingspan-to-body-weight ratio of any bird, they are essentially aerial, able to stay aloft for more than a week.

- Ascension frigatebird, Fregata aquila (E)
- Great frigatebird, Fregata minor

== Boobies and gannets ==
Order: Suliformes Family: Sulidae

The sulids comprise the gannets and boobies. Both groups are medium-large coastal seabirds that plunge-dive for fish.

- Masked booby, Sula dactylatra
- Brown booby, Sula leucogaster
- Red-footed booby, Sula sula

== Herons, egrets, and bitterns ==
Order: Pelecaniformes Family: Ardeidae

The family Ardeidae contains the bitterns, herons and egrets. Herons and egrets are medium to large wading birds with long necks and legs. Bitterns tend to be shorter necked and more wary. Members of Ardeidae fly with their necks retracted, unlike other long-necked birds such as storks, ibises and spoonbills.

- Gray heron, Ardea cinerea (A)
- Purple heron, Ardea purpurea (A)
- Cattle egret, Bubulcus ibis (A)
- Squacco heron, Ardeola ralloides (A)

== Rollers ==
Order: Coraciiformes Family: Coraciidae

Rollers resemble crows in size and build, but are more closely related to the kingfishers and bee-eaters. They share the colourful appearance of those groups with blues and browns predominating. The two inner front toes are connected, but the outer toe is not.

- European roller, Coracias garrulus (A)

== Shrikes ==
Order: Passeriformes Family: Laniidae

Shrikes are passerine birds known for their habit of catching other birds and small animals and impaling the uneaten portions of their bodies on thorns. A typical shrike's beak is hooked, like a bird of prey.

- Red-backed shrike, Lanius collurio (A)

== Larks ==
Order: Passeriformes Family: Alaudidae

Larks are small terrestrial birds with often extravagant songs and display flights. Most larks are fairly dull in appearance. Their food is insects and seeds. There are 91 species worldwide and 4 species which occur in Burundi.

- Eurasian skylark, Alauda arvensis (A)

== Swallows ==
Order: Passeriformes Family: Hirundinidae

The family Hirundinidae is adapted to aerial feeding. They have a slender streamlined body, long pointed wings, and a short bill with a wide gape. The feet are adapted to perching rather than walking, and the front toes are partially joined at the base.

- Bank swallow, Riparia riparia (A)
- Barn swallow, Hirundo rustica (A)
- Common house-martin, Delichon urbicum (A)

== Starlings ==
Order: Passeriformes Family: Sturnidae

Starlings are small to medium-sized passerine birds. Their flight is strong and direct and they are very gregarious. Their preferred habitat is fairly open country. They eat insects and fruit. Plumage is typically dark with a metallic sheen.

- Common hill myna, Gracula religiosa (I)
- European starling, Sturnus vulgaris (A)
- Common myna, Acridotheres tristis (I)

== Thrushes and allies ==
Order: Passeriformes Family: Turdidae

The thrushes are a group of passerine birds that occur mainly in the Old World. They are plump, soft plumaged, small to medium-sized insectivores or sometimes omnivores, often feeding on the ground. Many have attractive songs.

- Song thrush, Turdus philomelos (A)
- Eurasian blackbird, Turdus merula (A)

== Old World flycatchers ==
Order: Passeriformes Family: Muscicapidae

Old World flycatchers are a large group of small passerine birds native to the Old World. They are mainly small arboreal insectivores. The appearance of these birds is highly varied, but they mostly have weak songs and harsh calls.

- European robin, Erithacus rubecula (A)

== Weavers and allies ==
Order: Passeriformes Family: Ploceidae

The weavers are small passerine birds related to the finches. They are seed-eating birds with rounded conical bills. The males of many species are brightly colored, usually in red or yellow and black, though some species show variation in color only in the breeding season.

- Red fody, Foudia madagascariensis (I)
- Southern red bishop, Euplectes orix (A)
- White-winged widowbird, Euplectes albonotatus (A)
- Long-tailed widowbird, Euplectes progne (A)

== Waxbills, munias, and allies ==
Order: Passeriformes Family: Estrildidae

The members of this family are small passerine birds native to the Old World tropics. They are gregarious and often colonial seed eaters with short thick but pointed bills. They are all similar in structure and habits, but have wide variation in plumage colors and patterns.

- Black-faced waxbill, Brunhilda erythronotos (A)
- Common waxbill, Estrilda astrild (I)
- Violet-eared waxbill, Granatina granatina (A)
- Southern cordonbleu, Uraeginthus angolensis (A)
- Green-winged pytilia, Pytilia melba (A)

== Indigobirds ==
Order: Passeriformes Family: Viduidae

The indigobirds are finch-like species which usually have black or indigo predominating in their plumage. All are brood parasites, which lay their eggs in the nests of estrildid finches.

- Eastern paradise-whydah, Vidua paradisaea (A)
- Shaft-tailed whydah, Vidua regia (I)

== Old World sparrows ==
Order: Passeriformes Family: Passeridae

Sparrows are small passerine birds. In general, sparrows tend to be small, plump, brown or gray birds with short tails and short powerful beaks. Sparrows are seed eaters, but they also consume small insects.

- House sparrow, Passer domesticus (A)

== Finches, euphonias, and allies ==
Order: Passeriformes Family: Fringillidae

Finches are seed-eating passerine birds, that are small to moderately large and have a strong beak, usually conical and in some species very large. All have twelve tail feathers and nine primaries. These birds have a bouncing flight with alternating bouts of flapping and gliding on closed wings, and most sing well.

- Common chaffinch, Fringilla coelebs (A)
- European greenfinch, Chloris chloris (A)
- Yellow-fronted canary, Crithagra mozambica (A)
- Yellow canary, Crithagra flaviventris (I)
- European goldfinch, Carduelis carduelis (A)

== See also ==
- List of birds
- Lists of birds by region
