= Stenogrammitis ascensionensis =

Conservation status
- Critically Endangered (IUCN 3.1)

Scientific classification
- Kingdom: Plantae
- Clade: Tracheophytes
- Division: Polypodiophyta
- Class: Polypodiopsida
- Order: Polypodiales
- Suborder: Polypodiineae
- Family: Polypodiaceae
- Genus: Stenogrammitis
- Species: S. ascensionensis

Binomial name
- Stenogrammitis ascensionensis (Hieron.) Labiak

Synonyms
- Xiphopteris ascensionense (Hieron.) Cronk

Species of fern

Stenogrammitis ascensionensis is a species of grammitid fern in the family Polypodiaceae. It is endemic to Ascension Island. Its natural habitats are introduced vegetation. It is threatened by habitat loss.
