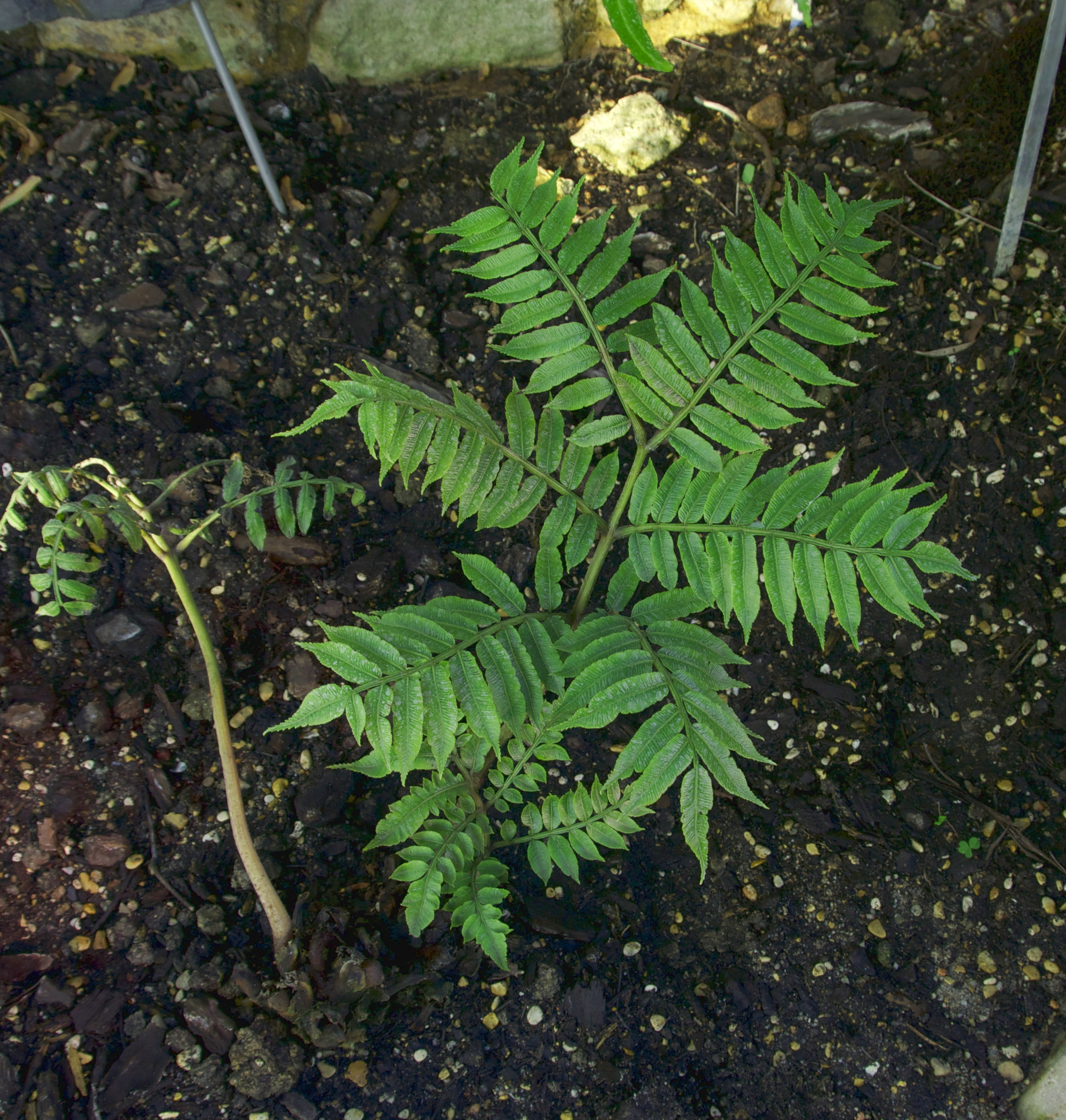
- P. purpurascens photographed at the Jardin des plantes de Paris

Conservation status
- Critically Endangered (IUCN 3.1)

Scientific classification
- Kingdom: Plantae
- Clade: Tracheophytes
- Division: Polypodiophyta
- Class: Polypodiopsida
- Order: Marattiales
- Family: Marattiaceae
- Genus: Ptisana
- Species: P. purpurascens

Binomial name
- Ptisana purpurascens (de Vriese) Murdock

Synonyms
- Marattia purpurascens de Vriese; Marattia ascensionis J.Sm.; Marattia ascensionis var. cristata J.Sm.; Marattia elegans var. erecta Houlston & T. Moore; Marattia fraxinea var. purpurascens (de Vriese) Baker

= Ptisana purpurascens =

Species of fern

Ptisana purpurascens is a species of fern in the family Marattiaceae that is endemic to Ascension Island. It is considered a critically endangered species.

== Taxonomy and history ==
This species was first formally described by Dutch botanist Willem Hendrik de Vriese in 1853 as Marattia purpurascens, placing it in the existing genus Marattia. It was transferred into the newly described genus Ptisana by Andrew G. Murdock in 2008 alongside several other species previously placed in the genus Marattia. Genetic and morphological similarities indicate that P. purpurascens is closely linked to the Ptisana fraxinia species complex, and may even be a part of it.

== Distribution and habitat ==
Endemic to central Ascension Island in the South Atlantic Ocean, P. purpurascens is known only from a single population on the upper slopes of Green Mountain at altitudes of 700–860 m (2,300–2,820 ft). The majority of the population can be found on the south and east facing slopes, with a few isolated plants growing on the south-west slopes or amongst a bamboo thicket near the summit. The total extent of this species is estimated to be approximately 12 ha (30 acres), with the area of occupancy estimated to be less than 4.5 ha (11 acres).

== Description ==
P. purpurascens is the largest endemic plant species on Ascension Island. It has a globular rhizome with stipule-like fleshy outgrowths. The fronds are large, measuring up to 1 m (3 ft 3 in) long, with purplish petioles and dark green, bipinnate leaves.

== Ecology ==
The native high-altitude plant community of Green Mountain is severely degraded, and the exact composition of the plant community originally inhabited by P. purpurascens is not known. Currently, the native species most strongly associated with P. purpurascens is Histiopteris incisa.

== Conservation status ==
P. purpurascens is listed as critically endangered by the International Union for Conservation of Nature under criteria B1ab(iii) and B2ab(iii), based on its restricted area of occupancy and the decline of its habitat. Its primary threats include habitat loss, invasive species, climate change, severe weather, and landslides. The entire wild population is estimated to consist of 600–800 mature plants, and the small size of the area occupied by this species makes it especially susceptible to these threats.

The natural habitat of P. purpurascens on Green Mountain has largely been replaced by man-made cloud forest, with the remaining areas of intact habitat becoming increasingly fragmented. Lower areas of this habitat have been partially smothered by Buddleja madagascariensis and Clerodendrum chinense, while other weeds such as Miconia crenata, Paspalum scrobiculatum, Piper aduncum, and Rubus species threaten to crowd out young ferns. Young ferns are also grazed on by invasive rabbits.

The entire population of P. purpurascens is located within the boundaries of Green Mountain National Park, a protected area, and the species is protected under a local wildlife protection ordinance that prohibits the taking or damaging of scheduled species. P. purpurascens is cultivated by the Royal Botanic Gardens, Kew for the purpose of ex situ conservation.
