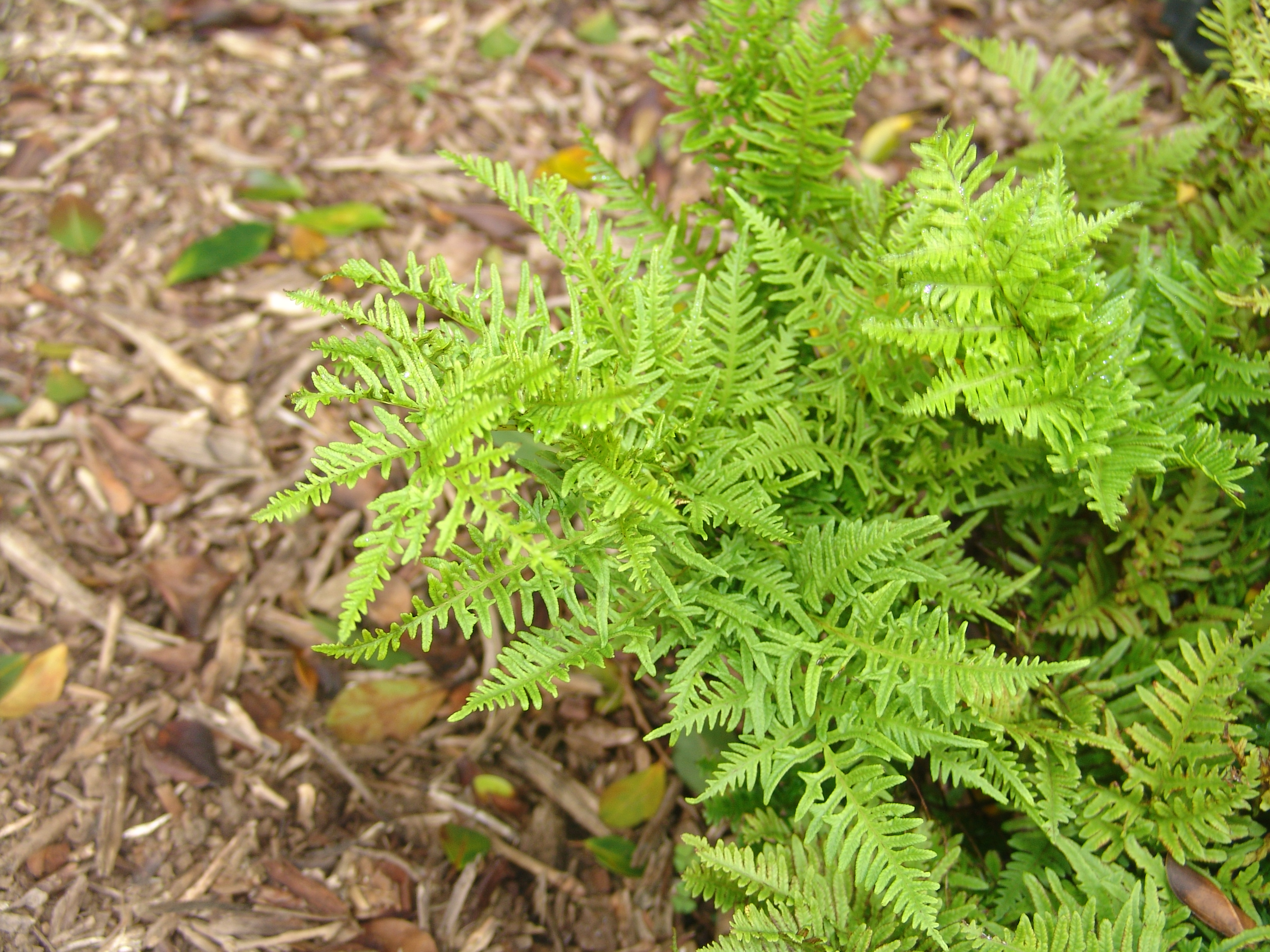

Conservation status
- Critically Endangered (IUCN 3.1)

Scientific classification
- Kingdom: Plantae
- Clade: Tracheophytes
- Division: Polypodiophyta
- Class: Polypodiopsida
- Order: Polypodiales
- Family: Pteridaceae
- Genus: Pteris
- Species: P. adscensionis

Binomial name
- Pteris adscensionis Sw.

= Pteris adscensionis =

Species of fern

Pteris adscensionis is a fern species in the subfamily Pteridoideae of the family Pteridaceae. It is endemic to Ascension Island, and there are thought to be fewer than 500 individuals left in the wild. Its natural habitat has been severely reduced due to the large number of species introduced to the island when it was first settled in the 18th century.
