= Asplenium ascensionis =

Conservation status
- Vulnerable (IUCN 3.1)

Scientific classification
- Kingdom: Plantae
- Clade: Tracheophytes
- Division: Polypodiophyta
- Class: Polypodiopsida
- Order: Polypodiales
- Suborder: Aspleniineae
- Family: Aspleniaceae
- Genus: Asplenium
- Species: A. ascensionis

Binomial name
- Asplenium ascensionis S.Watson

Species of fern in the spleenwort family

Asplenium ascensionis is a species of fern in the family Aspleniaceae that is endemic to Ascension Island. Its natural habitats are receding due to introduced vegetation. It is threatened by habitat loss.

== Distribution and habitat ==
A. ascensionis is endemic to central Ascension Island in the South Atlantic Ocean, where it grows on Green Mountain and the surrounding areas at altitudes of 430–770 m (1,410–2,530 ft) above sea level.

== Description ==
A. ascensionis is a small fern with a creeping habit. The fronds measure 3–6 in (76–152 mm) long with 15–25 irregularly-shaped pinnae on each side.

== Ecology ==
Adult A. ascensionis plants are capable of reproducing vegetatively, with small plantlets growing from the tips of the fronds, or sexually, with spores that are dispersed by the wind. Spores seem to require damp, shaded conditions to germinate, with most young plants and gametophytes occurring in sheltered crevices.

== Conservation status ==
A. ascensionis is listed as vulnerable by the International Union for the Conservation of Nature under criteria B1ab(iii) and B2ab(iii), based on its restricted area of occupancy and the decline of its habitat. It is primarily threatened by invasive species.

All known populations of A. ascensionis are located within the boundaries of Green Mountain National Park, a protected area, and the species is protected under a local wildlife protection ordinance that prohibits the taking or damaging of scheduled species.
