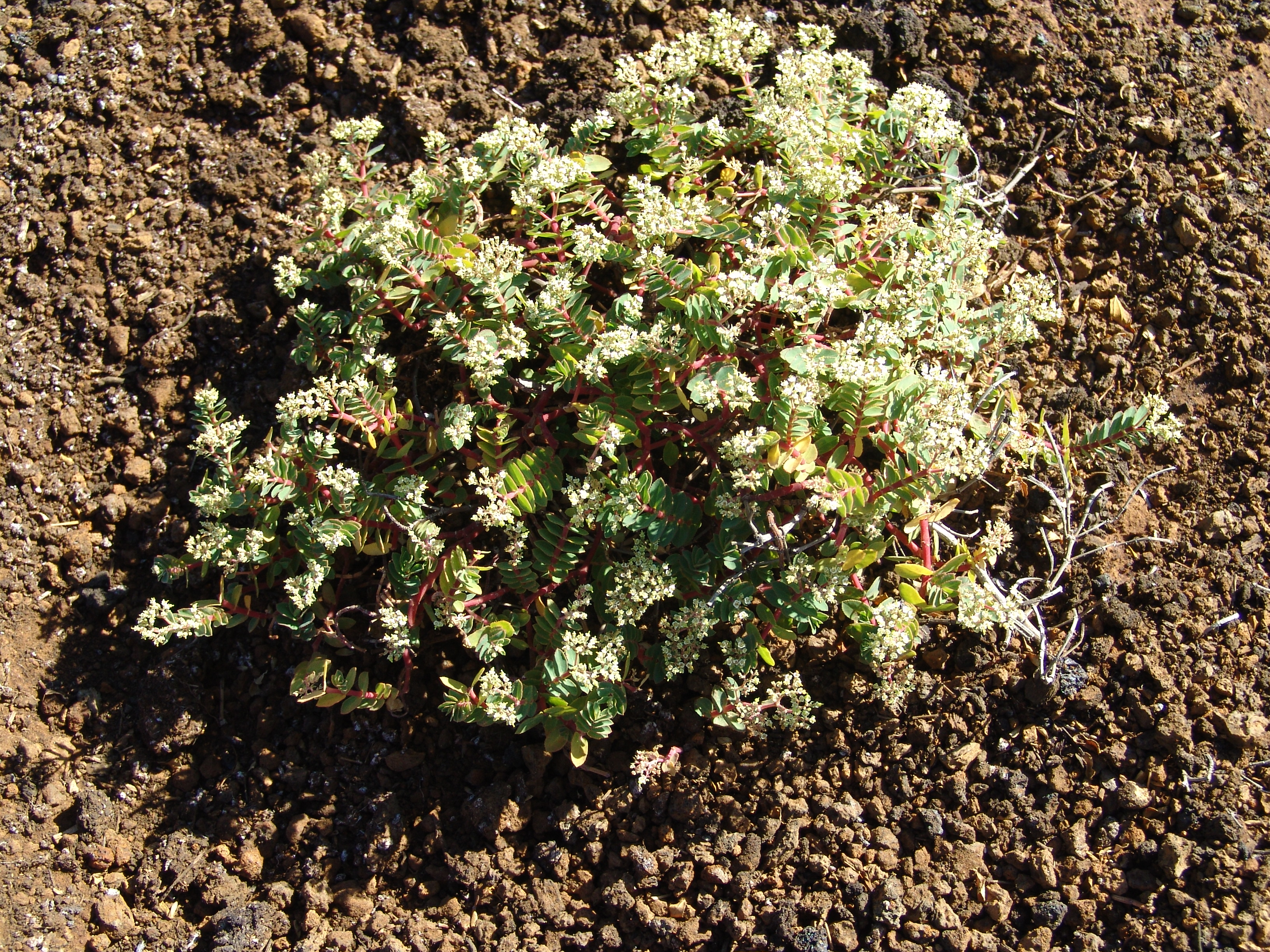

Conservation status
- Critically Endangered (IUCN 3.1)

Scientific classification
- Kingdom: Plantae
- Clade: Tracheophytes
- Clade: Angiosperms
- Clade: Eudicots
- Clade: Rosids
- Order: Malpighiales
- Family: Euphorbiaceae
- Genus: Euphorbia
- Species: E. origanoides

Binomial name
- Euphorbia origanoides L.

= Euphorbia origanoides =

Species of flowering plant

Euphorbia origanoides, also called Ascension spurge, is a species of plant in the family Euphorbiaceae. It is endemic to Ascension Island, a dependency of the UK overseas territory of Saint Helena. Its natural habitats are introduced vegetation. It is threatened by habitat loss.
