= Telephone numbers in Africa =

Africa\Asia telephone calling codes

The following are country calling codes in Africa.+223 ******80

== States and territories with country calling codes ==
Country name	Country Code	International Call Prefix	Trunk Prefix	Main article
North Africa
Algeria	+213	00	0	Telephone numbers in Algeria
Egypt	+20	00	0	Telephone numbers in Egypt
Libya	+218	00	0	Telephone numbers in Libya
Morocco	+212	00	0	Telephone numbers in Morocco
South Sudan	+211	00	0	Telephone numbers in South Sudan
Sudan	+249	00	0	Telephone numbers in Sudan
Tunisia	+216	00		Telephone numbers in Tunisia
East Africa
Burundi	+257	00		Telephone numbers in Burundi
Comoros	+269	00		Telephone numbers in the Comoros
Kenya	+254	000	0	Telephone numbers in Kenya
Madagascar	+261	00	0	Telephone numbers in Madagascar
Malawi	+265	00	0	Telephone numbers in Malawi
Mauritius	+230	00		Telephone numbers in Mauritius
Mayotte (France)	+262	00		Telephone numbers in Mayotte
Mozambique	+258	00		Telephone numbers in Mozambique
Réunion (France)	+262	00		Telephone numbers in Réunion
Rwanda	+250	00	0	Telephone numbers in Rwanda
Seychelles	+248	00		Telephone numbers in Seychelles
Tanzania	+255	000	0	Telephone numbers in Tanzania
Uganda	+256	000	0	Telephone numbers in Uganda
Horn of Africa
Djibouti	+253	00		Telephone numbers in Djibouti
Eritrea	+291	011 & 00	0	Telephone numbers in Eritrea
Somalia	+252	00	0	Telephone numbers in Somalia
Central Africa
Angola	+244	00		Telephone numbers in Angola
Cameroon	+237	00		Telephone numbers in Cameroon
Central African Republic	+236	00		Telephone numbers in the Central African Republic
Chad	+235	00		Telephone numbers in Chad
Democratic Republic of the Congo	+243	00	0	Telephone numbers in the Democratic Republic of the Congo
Republic of the Congo	+242	00		Telephone numbers in the Republic of the Congo
Equatorial Guinea	+240	00		Telephone numbers in Equatorial Guinea
Gabon	+241	00		Telephone numbers in Gabon
São Tomé and Príncipe	+239	00		Telephone numbers in São Tomé and Príncipe
Southern Africa
Botswana	+267	00		Telephone numbers in Botswana
Lesotho	+266	00		Telephone numbers in Lesotho
Namibia	+264	00	0	Telephone numbers in Namibia
South Africa	+27	00	0	Telephone numbers in South Africa
Eswatini	+268	00		Telephone numbers in Eswatini
Zambia	+260	00	0	Telephone numbers in Zambia
Zimbabwe	+263	00	0	Telephone numbers in Zimbabwe
West Africa
Ascension Island (United Kingdom)	+247	00		Telephone numbers in Ascension Island
Benin	+229	00		Telephone numbers in Benin
Burkina Faso	+226	00		Telephone numbers in Burkina Faso
Cape Verde	+238	00		Telephone numbers in Cape Verde
Ivory Coast	+225	00		Telephone numbers in Ivory Coast
Gambia	+220	00		Telephone numbers in the Gambia
Ghana	+233	00	0	Telephone numbers in Ghana
Guinea	+224	00		Telephone numbers in Guinea
Guinea-Bissau	+245	00		Telephone numbers in Guinea-Bissau
Liberia	+231	00	0	Telephone numbers in Liberia
Mali	+223	00		Telephone numbers in Mali
Mauritania	+222	00		Telephone numbers in Mauritania
Niger	+227	00		Telephone numbers in Niger
Nigeria	+234	009	0	Telephone numbers in Nigeria
Saint Helena (United Kingdom)	+290	00		Telephone numbers in Saint Helena
Senegal	+221	00		Telephone numbers in Senegal
Sierra Leone	+232	00	0	Telephone numbers in Sierra Leone
Togo	+228	00		Telephone numbers in Togo
Tristan da Cunha (United Kingdom)	+290	00		Telephone numbers in Tristan da Cunha

== States and territories without a country calling code ==
Country name	Country Code	International Call Prefix	Main article
Canary Islands (Spain)	+34 922 (Province of Santa Cruz de Tenerife), +34 928 (Province of Las Palmas)	00	Telephone numbers in the Canary Islands
Ceuta (Spain)	+34 956	00	Telephone numbers in Ceuta
Madeira (Portugal)	+351 291	00	Telephone numbers in Madeira
Melilla (Spain)	+34 952	00	Telephone numbers in Melilla
Plazas de soberanía (Spain)	+34	00	Telephone numbers in Plazas de soberanía
