= 020 (disambiguation) =

020 is the dialing code for London, UK.

020 may also refer to:

- The Nairobi area code, for telephone numbers in Kenya
- The Amsterdam area code, for telephone numbers in the Netherlands
- The Guangzhou area code, for telephone numbers in China
- The Pune area code, for telephone numbers in India
- The Motorola 68020 processor
- Tyrrell 020, a Formula One racing car
