= Telephone numbers in Madagascar =

- Country: Madagascar
- Continent: Africa
- NSN length: 7
- Country code: +261
- International access: 00
- Long-distance: 0

Telephone numbers in Madagascar are seven digits long, the first two digits being an area code.

Recent ITU documents suggest the area code is preceded by a two digit operator code, for example "20" for Telecom Malagasy.

== International numbering plan ==
International numbering format: +261 AB Z PQMCDU

where:

- +261 international prefix
- AB operator code (two digits for each operator)
- Z area code (described as administrative area)
- PQMCDU subscriber number

Country code 261
Country code 261 for all existing telecommunication networks in Madagascar.
AB – operator code
Each operator is identified by two digits described by the characters AB:
- 20-29 identification code for fixed service operators,
- 30-39 identification code for mobile service operators
Z – area code valid for Telecom Malagasy (fixed-service operator)
Madagascar is divided into six zones:
- Z = 2 Antananarivo zone
- Z = 4 Antananarivo zone (rest of the province)
- Z = 5 Toamasina zone
- Z = 6 Mahajanga zone
- Z = 7 Fianarantsoa zone
- Z = 8 Antsiranana zone
- Z = 9 Toliara zone

== National numbering plan ==
At national level, a closed numbering system of seven digits is used. That is, all subscriber numbers requested to the same operator Telecom Malagasy (local and national) can be obtained by dialling seven digits (ZPQMCDU).

== List of National Destination codes in Madagascar ==
Operator code (AB)	Type	Operator
20	Geographic number	Telecom Malagasy
22	Non geographic number	Gulfsat Madagascar
32 or 37	Non geographic number	Orange Madagascar
33	Non geographic number	Airtel Madagascar
34	Non geographic number	Telma mobile
38	Non geographic number	Telecom Malagasy
39	Non geographic number	bip Madagascar

== List of area codes in Madagascar ==
LIST OF AREA CODES
Area Code (ZP)	Area Code (AB ZP) (ITU)	Area/City
22	20 22	Antananarivo
42	—	Ambatolampy
44	—	Antsirabe
47	—	Ambositra
48	—	Mid-West Madagascar
53	20 53	Toamasina
54	20 54	Ambatondrazaka
56	20 56	Moramanga
57	—	Maroantsetra
—	20 57	Sainte Marie
62	20 62	Mahajanga
67	20 67	Antsohihy
—	20 69	Maintirano
72	—	Manakara — Mananjary
—	20 722	Manakara
—	20 729	Mananjary
73	20 73	Farafangana
75	20 75	Fianarantsoa
82	20 82	Antsiranana (Diego Suarez)
86	20 86	Nosy Be
88	20 88	Sambava
92	20 92	Fort Dauphin
94	20 94	Toliary (Tulear)
95	20 95	Morondava
