= Saint Helena, Ascension and Tristan da Cunha =

British Overseas Territory in the South Atlantic

- Overseas territory of the United Kingdom
- Flag
- Anthem: "God Save the King"
- Location of Saint Helena, Ascension and Tristan da Cunha (circled in red). Ascension is the northernmost circle, Tristan da Cunha is the two adjacent circles in the far south, and Saint Helena is in the middle. The United Kingdom is located at the top in white.
- Sovereignty: United Kingdom
- Saint Helena colonial charter: 1657
- Crown colony: 22 April 1834
- Ascension added: 13 September 1922
- Tristan da Cunha added: 13 January 1938
- Current constitution: 1 September 2009
- Capital: Jamestown; 15°56′S 05°43′W
- Largest city: Half Tree Hollow; 15°56′0″S 5°43′12″W
- Official languages: English
- Government: Self-governing dependency under a constitutional monarchy
  - Monarch: Charles III
  - Governor of Saint Helena, Ascension and Tristan da Cunha: Nigel Phillips
  - Administrator of Ascension: Simon Minshull
  - Administrator of Tristan da Cunha: Philip Kendall
  - Chief Minister of Saint Helena: Rebecca Cairns-Wicks

Government of the United Kingdom
  - Minister: Stewart Wood

Area
  - Total: 394 km^{2} (152 sq mi)
- Highest elevation: 2,062 m (6,765 ft)

Population
  - 2016 census: 5,633 (not ranked)
  - Density: 13.4/km^{2} (34.7/sq mi) (not ranked)
- GDP (nominal): 2015 estimate
  - Total: $43 million
  - Per capita: $7,724
- Currency: Saint Helena pound (£) (SHP) (Saint Helena and Ascension); Pound sterling (£) (GBP) (Tristan da Cunha)
- Time zone: UTC±00:00 (GMT)
- Date format: dd/mm/yyyy
- Driving side: Left
- Calling code: +290 (Saint Helena and Tristan da Cunha); +247 (Ascension)
- UK postcode: STHL 1ZZ (Saint Helena); ASCN 1ZZ (Ascension); TDCU 1ZZ (Tristan da Cunha)
- ISO 3166 code: SH
- Internet TLD: .sh; .ac (Ascension only)
- Website: www.sainthelena.gov.sh

Saint Helena, Ascension and Tristan da Cunha is a British Overseas Territory located in the South Atlantic and consisting of the island of Saint Helena, Ascension Island, and the archipelago of Tristan da Cunha (including Gough Island). Its name was Saint Helena and Dependencies until 1 September 2009, when a new constitution came into force, giving the three islands equal status as three territories, with a grouping under the Crown.

== History ==
Of volcanic origin, the islands of Saint Helena, Ascension Island, and Tristan da Cunha were all formerly separate colonies of the English crown, though separately discovered by several Portuguese explorers between 1502 and 1504.

=== Portuguese discovery ===
The Portuguese found Saint Helena uninhabited, with an abundance of trees and fresh water. They imported livestock, fruit trees and vegetables, and built a chapel and one or two houses. Though they formed no permanent settlement, the island became crucially important for the collection of food and as a rendezvous point for homebound voyages from Asia. English privateer Francis Drake very probably located the island on the final lap of his circumnavigation of the world (1577–1580). Further visits by other English explorers followed, and, once St Helena's location was more widely known, English warships began to lie in wait in the area to attack Portuguese carracks on their way home from India. In developing their Far East trade, the Dutch also began to frequent the island. They made a formal claim to it in 1633 but did not settle the isle, and by 1651 largely abandoned it in favour of their colony at the Cape of Good Hope.

=== English colonisation ===
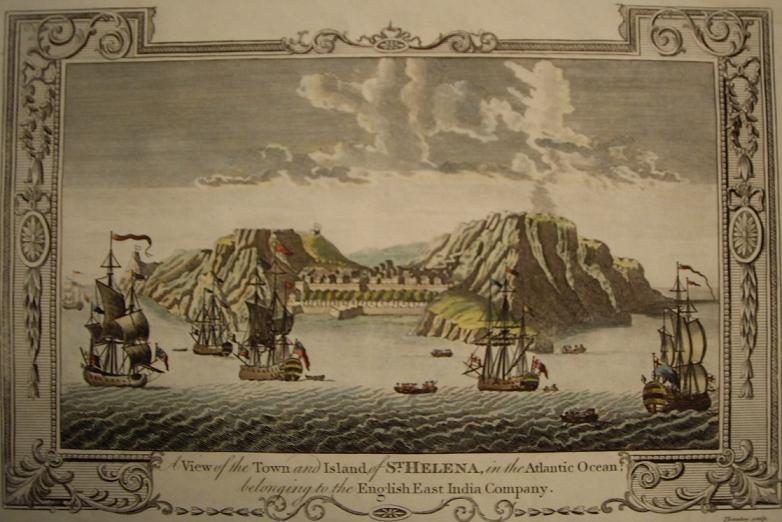
A View of the Town and Island of St Helena in the Atlantic Ocean belonging to the English East India Company (engraving c. 1790)

In 1657, the English East India Company was granted a charter to govern Saint Helena by Oliver Cromwell, and the following year the Company decided to fortify the island and colonise it with planters. The first governor, Captain John Dutton, arrived in 1659, and it is from this date that St Helena claims to be Britain's second oldest remaining colony, after Bermuda. A fort was completed and a number of houses were built. After the Restoration of the British monarchy in 1660, the East India Company received a Royal Charter giving it the sole right to fortify and colonise the island. The fort was renamed James Fort and the town Jamestown, in honour of the Duke of York and heir apparent, later King James II of England and VII of Scotland.

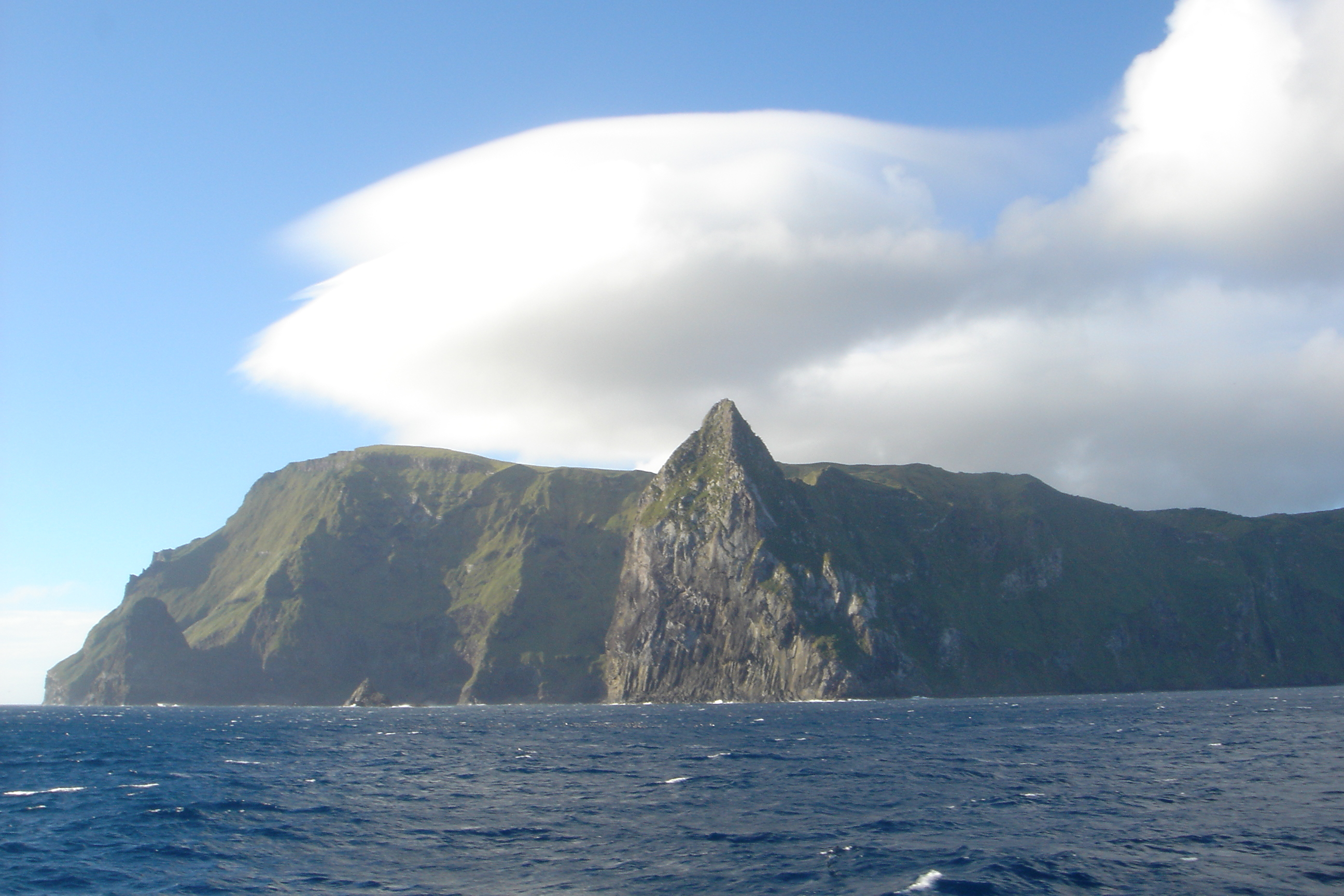
Gough and Inaccessible Islands were declared a World Heritage Site by UNESCO in 1995.

The Kingdom of England became part of the new Kingdom of Great Britain in 1707 and then the United Kingdom in 1801; the British Empire grew into a global great power. The island of Saint Helena became internationally known as the British government's chosen place of exile of Napoleon Bonaparte, who was detained on the island from October 1815 until his death on 5 May 1821, and it was made a British crown colony in 1834 by the Government of India Act 1833. Unoccupied Ascension Island was garrisoned by the Royal Navy on 22 October 1815, shortly after which the end of the Age of Sail made its difficult location in the equatorial doldrums less important relative to its strategic importance as a centrally positioned naval coaling station. For similar reasons Tristan da Cunha was annexed as a dependency of the Cape Colony (British South Africa) on 14 August 1816, at the settlement of the Napoleonic Wars. For a short period just previously, Tristan da Cunha had been inhabited by a private American expedition who named the territory the Islands of Refreshment.

The political union between these colonies began to take shape on 12 September 1922, when by letters patent Ascension Island became a dependency of Saint Helena. Lightly populated Tristan da Cunha, even today little more than an outpost with a population of less than three hundred, followed suit on 12 January 1938. The three island groups shared this constitutional relationship until 1 September 2009, when the dependencies were raised to equal status with St. Helena and the territories changed its name from "Saint Helena and Dependencies" to "Saint Helena, Ascension and Tristan da Cunha".

=== World War II and subsequent military presence ===
During the Battle of the Atlantic of World War II and the following several years of U-boat warfare in the Atlantic, both Saint Helena and Ascension Island were used by the Allies to base patrolling anti-surface-commerce-raider and anti-submarine warfare (ASW) forces against the Axis powers' naval units. Initially long range naval patrol flying boats were used in the effort, and later in the war during the struggle to improve air coverage over the commercially important sea lanes, air strips were built to support land based aircraft which supplied, augmented and complemented the PBY Catalina patrol planes in the vitally important ASW mission.

The United Kingdom and the United States still jointly operate the airfield (RAF Ascension Island) on Ascension, which also serves as a space-based communications, signals intelligence, and navigation nexus and hub (Ground station). One of only four GPS satellite ground antennas is located there.

== Geography ==
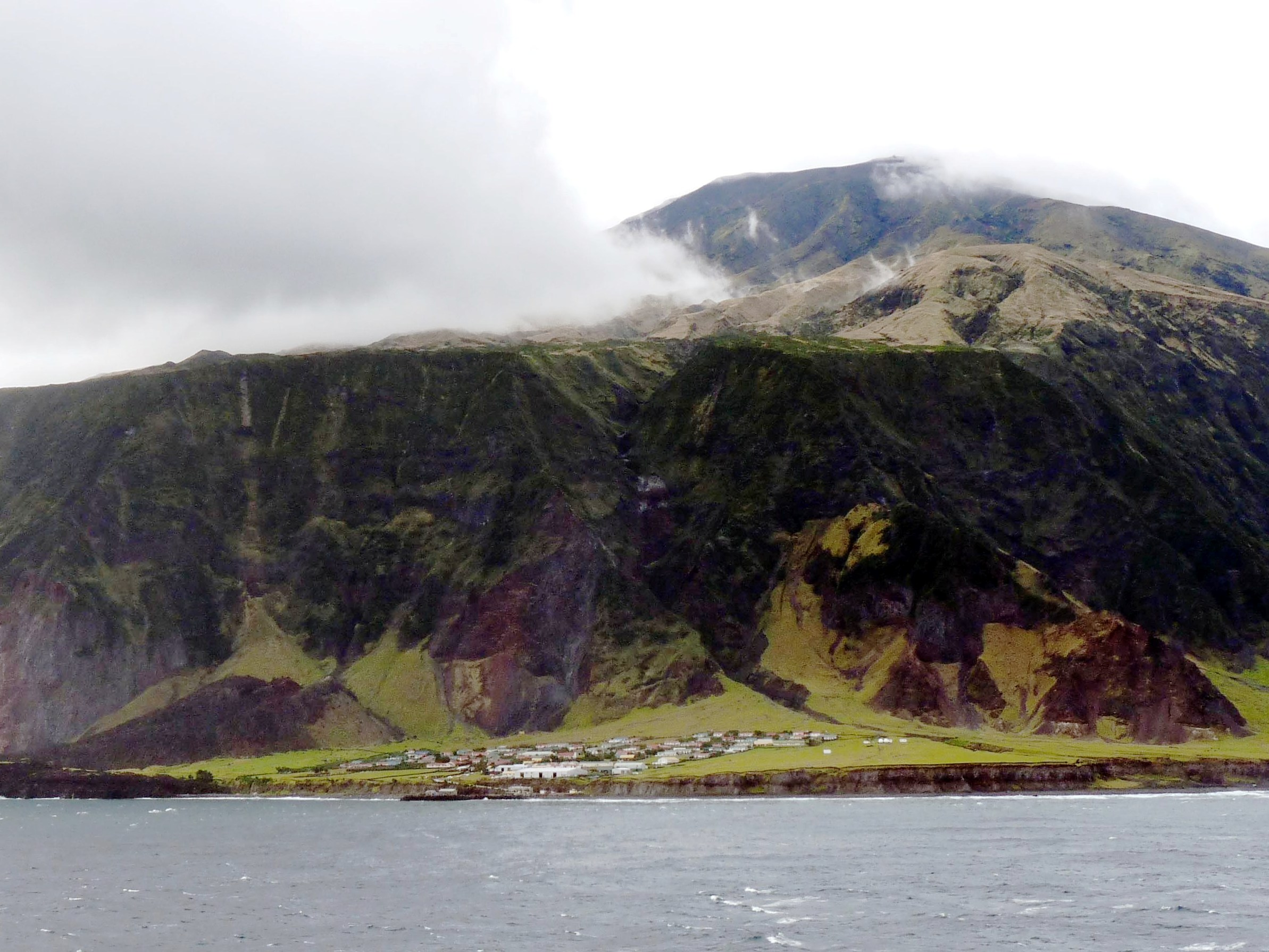
Edinburgh of the Seven Seas, the only settlement on Tristan da Cunha. Behind it is Queen Mary's Peak, a shield volcano.

The territories stretch across a huge distance of the South Atlantic Ocean with the northernmost island, Ascension, having a latitude of 7° 56′ S of the equator and the southernmost island, Gough Island, at 40° 19′ S. Between Saint Helena and Tristan da Cunha is the Tropic of Capricorn. The distance between the northern tip of Ascension Island and the southern tip of Gough Island is 3,642 kilometres (2,263 mi) (an equivalent distance between London and the Dead Sea). The three territories lie in the Western Hemisphere and have the same time zone: Greenwich Mean Time. Daylight saving time is not observed.

Although all three territories were formed by volcanic activity, only the Tristan da Cunha group of islands are volcanically active at the moment.

The highest point of the territories is Queen Mary's Peak on the island of Tristan da Cunha, with an elevation of 2,062 metres (6,765 ft) above sea level. The mountain is listed as an ultra prominent peak.

=== Climate ===
Because of the massive distance from north to south (over 3,600 km (2,200 mi)), the territories have various climates. Ascension has a warm, arid climate, with temperatures all year long reaching above 20 °C (68 °F). St Helena is more moderate (and arid near the coasts). Tristan da Cunha, being closer to the Antarctic Circle, is much cooler and wetter. The uninhabited southernmost Gough Island is wetter and has freezing winter temperatures.

=== Territorial waters ===
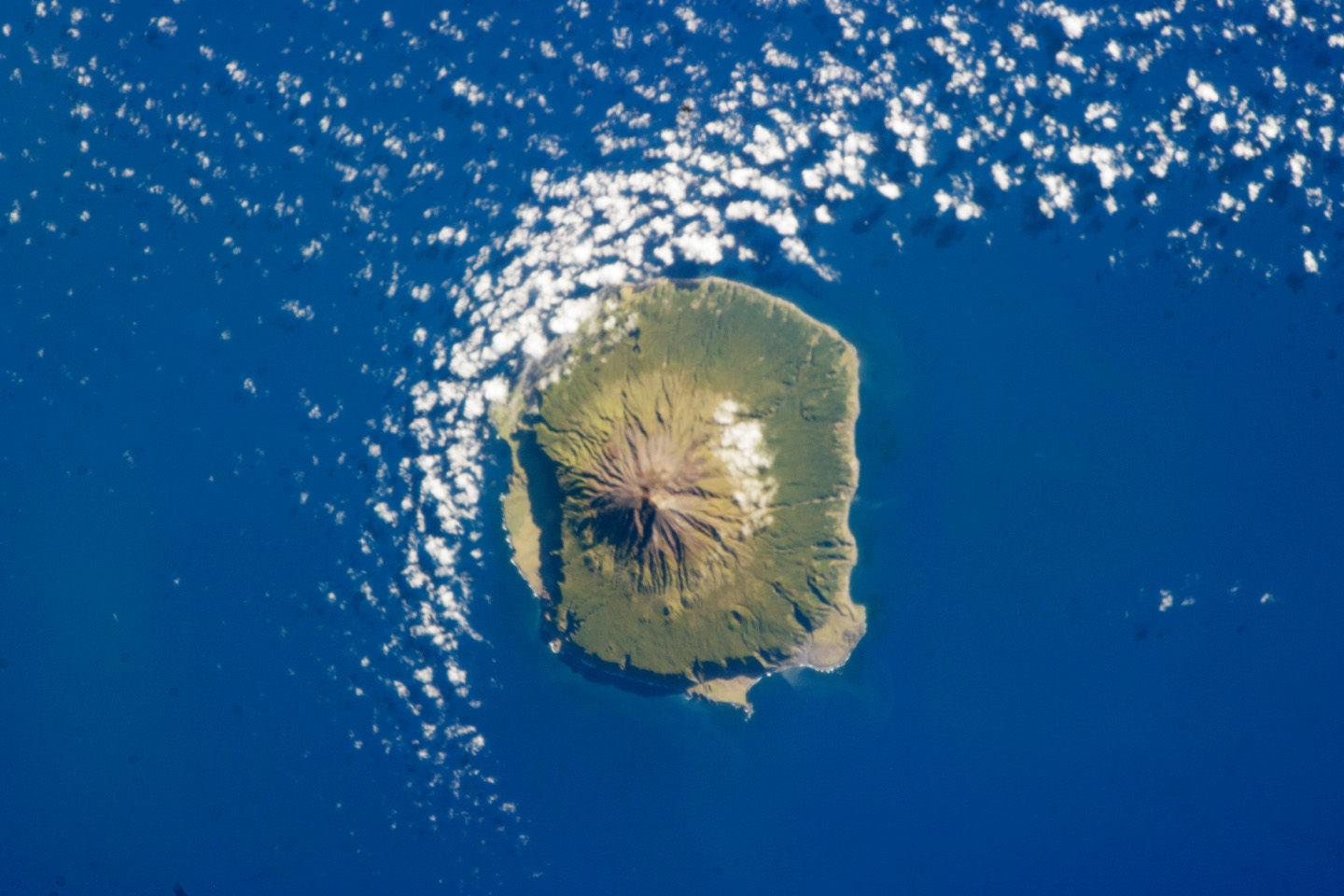
Tristan da Cunha on 6 February 2013, as seen from the International Space Station

The territorial waters of the islands extend out to 12 nautical miles (22 km) from their coastal baselines. The Exclusive Economic Zones (EEZs) extend 200 nautical miles (370 km) from the islands' baselines. The three EEZs do not overlap or touch one another, nor do they reach the EEZs of any other country or territory. The territories have the largest EEZ of any of the British overseas territories (indeed larger than the United Kingdom's) and if included in the ranking of countries by size of EEZ, the territories would be 21st, behind Portugal and ahead of the Philippines. Neither the islands nor their EEZs are the subject of any current international dispute.

EEZs of the three territories
Part	km^{2}	sq mi
Ascension	441,658	170,525
Saint Helena	444,916	171,783
Tristan da Cunha	754,720	291,400
Total	1,641,294	633,708

An application was made in 2008 by the United Kingdom to the United Nations Commission on the Limits of the Continental Shelf to extend the limit of the continental shelf claim of Ascension Island beyond 200 nautical miles (370 km). The Commission recommended in 2010 that the limit not be extended beyond the standard limit, based on scientific surveys.

=== Administrative divisions ===
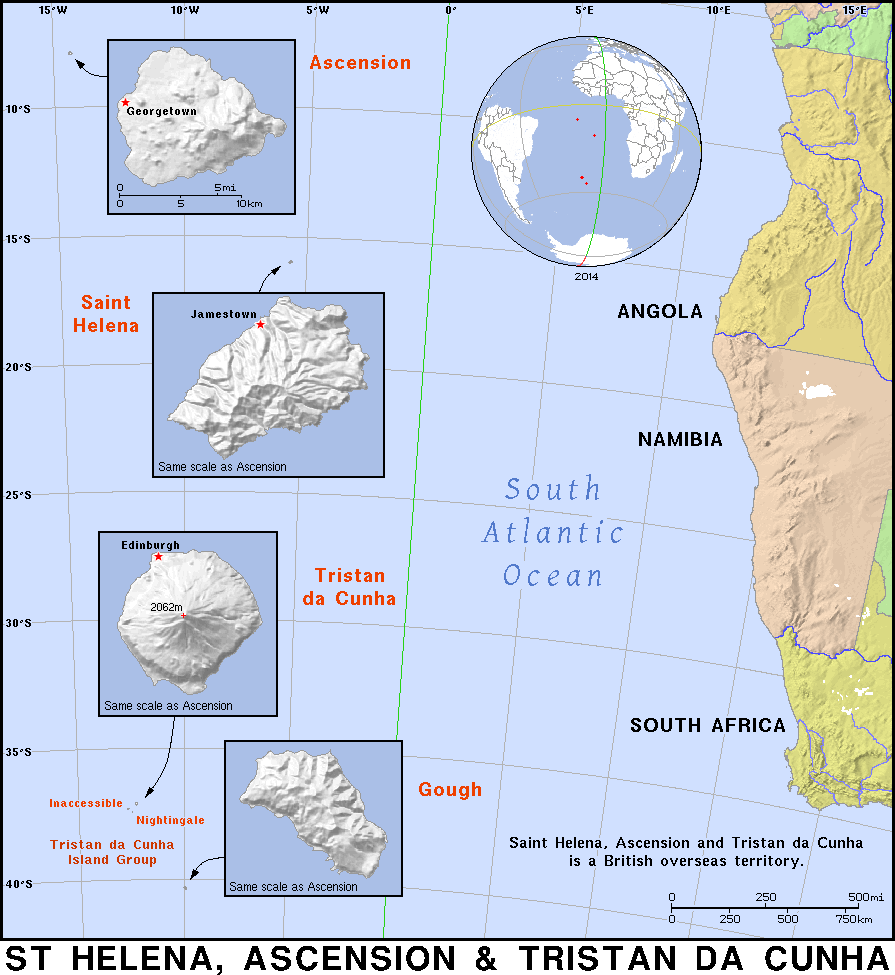

Administratively, each territory of Saint Helena, Ascension and Tristan da Cunha is governed by a council. The Governor of the territory presides over the Saint Helena Legislative Council, and an Administrator on Ascension Island and an Administrator on Tristan da Cunha preside over these two areas' Island Councils. See Constitution section below.

Administrative area	Area km^{2}	Area mi^{2}	Population	Administrative centre
Saint Helena	122	47	4,534	Jamestown
Ascension Island	88	34	806	Georgetown
Tristan da Cunha	207	71	293	Edinburgh of the Seven Seas
Main island	98	39	293	
Inaccessible Island	14	5	0	
Nightingale Islands	3.4	1.3	0	
Gough Island	91	35	0	
Total	394	152	5,633	Jamestown

The island of St Helena is then further divided into eight districts.

== Constitution ==
King Charles III is the head of state of Saint Helena, Ascension and Tristan da Cunha.

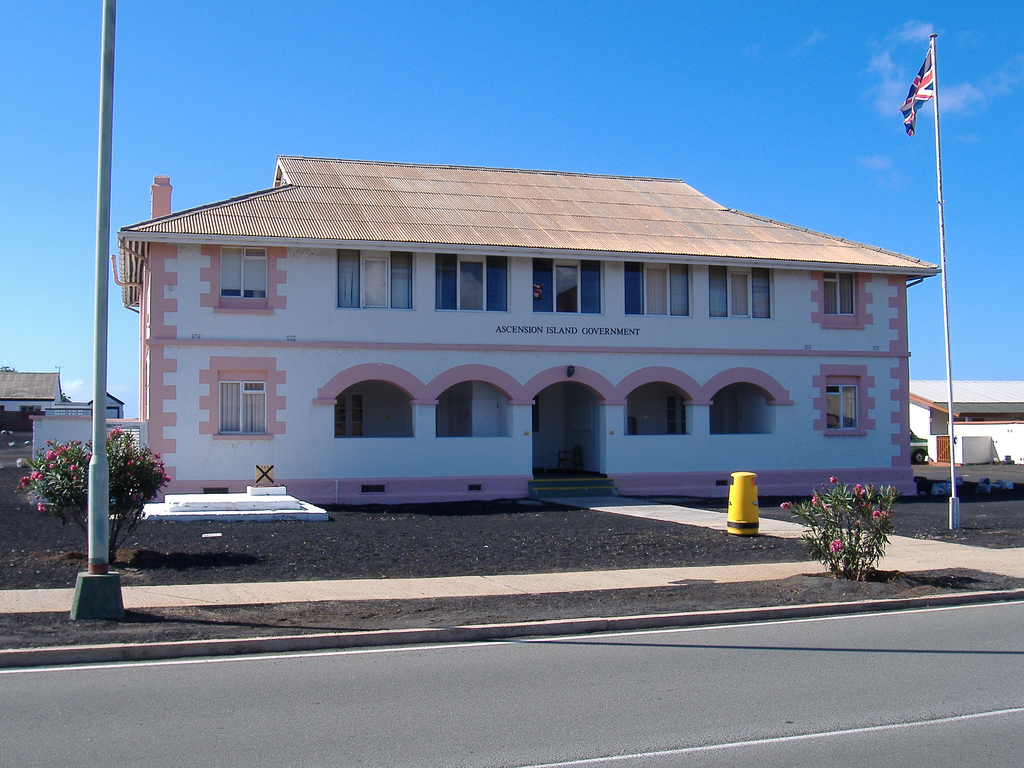
Ascension Government House

The St Helena, Ascension and Tristan da Cunha Constitution Order 2009 (an Order in Council of the Privy Council of the United Kingdom) enacted a new constitution for the territory, which came into effect on 1 September 2009, and elevated Ascension Island and Tristan da Cunha from being dependencies of Saint Helena to equal constituent parts. Each constituent part has its own government, however the constitution order states that Governor of Saint Helena is ex officio also the Governor of Ascension and the Governor of Tristan da Cunha. Due to the distance between the three constituent parts of the territory the Ascension and Tristan da Cunha each have an Administrator who represents the Governor when they are off island. Notably the constitution includes (for each territory) the "fundamental rights and freedoms of individuals".

Part	Crown representative	Council
Saint Helena	Governor of Saint Helena	Legislative Council of Saint Helena
Ascension Island	Governor of Ascension; Represented by the Administrator of Ascension	Ascension Island Council
Tristan da Cunha	Governor of Tristan da Cunha; Represented by the Administrator of Tristan da Cunha	Tristan da Cunha Island Council

Saint Helena also has an Executive Council. The Governor of Saint Helena is the British monarch's representative. The three territories share the same Attorney General, and the same Supreme Court and Court of Appeal.

== Police and defence ==
The Royal Saint Helena Police Service is responsible for policing on the islands. Defence is the responsibility of the United Kingdom, though no military forces are stationed on either Saint Helena or Tristan da Cunha. The Royal Air Force maintains a staging base at Ascension Island as part of British military forces in the South Atlantic.

== Education ==
Saint Helena has multiple schools, including St Helena Secondary School. Ascension has Two Boats School. Tristan da Cunha also has its own school named St. Mary's School.

== Religion ==
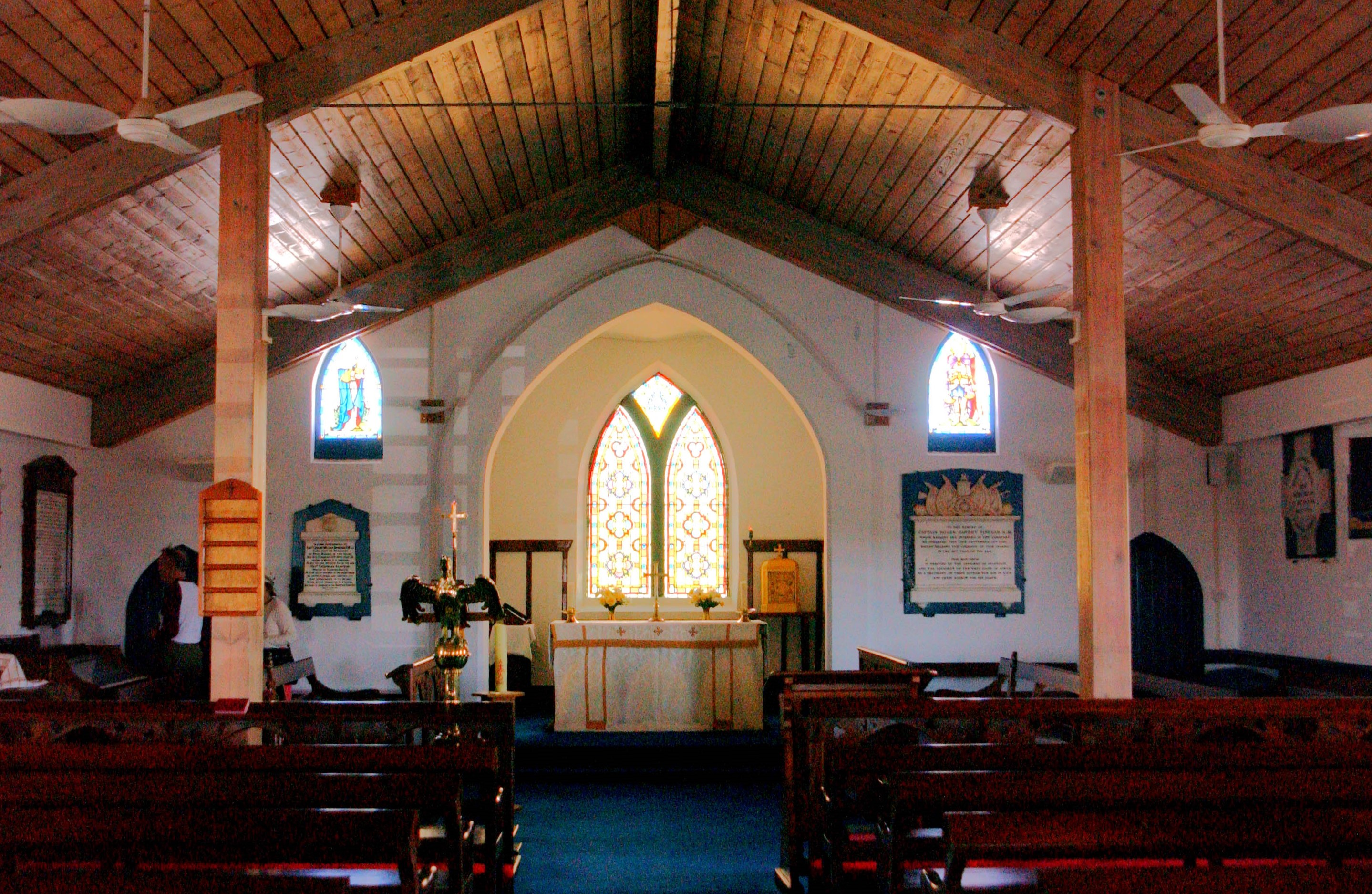
St. Mary's Anglican Church, Ascension

Most residents of St. Helena belong to the Anglican Communion through the Anglican Church of Southern Africa and are members of the Diocese of St Helena, which has its own bishop and includes Ascension Island.

Catholics are pastorally served by the Missio sui iuris of Saint Helena, Ascension and Tristan da Cunha, whose office of ecclesiastical superior is vested in the Apostolic Prefecture of the Falkland Islands.

== Currency ==
In 1821 a copper halfpenny was struck specifically for use in St. Helena, which subsequently intermingled with British coinage.

Saint Helena used sterling currency as in the United Kingdom until 1976, when it began to issue its own banknotes at par with sterling. In 1984, the territory also began to issue its own coinage for both St. Helena and Ascension Island, with the same sizes as the coinage of the United Kingdom. Also similar to British coinage, Queen Elizabeth II is found on the obverse, but the reverse have quite different designs referring to the territory. Whereas the coins are struck with "Saint Helena • Ascension", the banknotes only say, "Government of St. Helena". Commemorative coins are struck separately for the two entities and say either just "St. Helena" or "Ascencion Island". The Saint Helena pound also circulates on Ascension Island, but not in the other territory, Tristan da Cunha, where UK currency circulates.

The Currency Commissioners, part of the Government of Saint Helena, issue the St Helena pound banknotes and coins. There is no central bank; the currency is pegged to the pound sterling, which is controlled by the Bank of England in London. The Bank of Saint Helena is the territory's only bank. The bank sets its own deposit and lending rates, and has branches in Jamestown on Saint Helena and Georgetown on Ascension Island. Although the bank does not have a physical presence on Tristan da Cunha, the residents of Tristan are entitled to use its services.

== Communications ==
=== Telecommunications ===
Sure South Atlantic provide the telecommunications service in the territories. Saint Helena has the international calling code +290 which, since 2006, Tristan da Cunha shares. Since 2013, telephone numbers have been five digits long, with fixed line numbers beginning with "2" and mobile numbers with "5" or "6". Ascension Island has a separate country code, +247 and also has five-digit numbers on the island, having changed in 2015. Ascension Island also held an extensive broadcast facility for international shortwave transmissions to Africa and South America.

=== Mail ===
Ascension Island, Tristan da Cunha and Saint Helena all issue their own postage stamps, which provide a significant income. The three territories each have their own Royal Mail postal code:

- Ascension Island: ASCN 1ZZ
- Saint Helena: STHL 1ZZ
- Tristan da Cunha: TDCU 1ZZ

== Flags ==
The Flag of the United Kingdom is used for all official purposes; and each of the three territories has its own flag for official use. Between 2002 and 2013 Saint Helena and Tristan da Cunha each had their own separate flags, whilst Ascension Island used the Union Flag, and before 2002 the flag of Saint Helena was used in Tristan da Cunha for all official purposes.

=== Saint Helena ===
The flag of Saint Helena

The flag of Saint Helena was adopted on 4 October 1984. It is a defaced (i.e. differentiated) Blue Ensign, i.e. a blue field with the Union Jack in the upper hoist-side quadrant and the shield from the coat of arms of Saint Helena centred on the outer half of the flag. The shield features a rocky coastline and a three-masted sailing ship, with a Saint Helena plover, also known as a wirebird, atop. It was updated in 2018 to depict a more realistic-looking wirebird.

=== Ascension Island ===
The flag of Ascension Island

The flag of Ascension Island was adopted on 11 May 2013. The flag is a Blue Ensign design, defaced with the coat of arms of Ascension Island. Prior to the adoption of this flag, the island used the Union Flag of the United Kingdom for official purposes.

=== Tristan da Cunha ===
The flag of Tristan da Cunha

The flag of Tristan da Cunha was adopted on 20 October 2002, in a proclamation made by the Governor of Saint Helena under a Royal Warrant granted by Queen Elizabeth II. Prior to this, as a dependency of Saint Helena, Tristan da Cunha used the flag of Saint Helena for official purposes.

The flag is a Blue Ensign design, defaced with the coat of arms of Tristan da Cunha – a Tristan longboat above a Naval Crown, with a central shield decorated with four yellow-nosed albatrosses and flanked by two Tristan rock lobsters. Below this is a scroll with the territory's motto, Our faith is our strength.

== Transport ==
=== Maritime transport ===
Each of the three main islands has a harbour or small port, situated in the islands' chief settlements (Georgetown, Jamestown, and Edinburgh). In addition, St. Helena has a 118 m-long (387 ft) permanent wharf facility, built as part of the airport project, in Rupert's Bay for bulk, containerised, and general cargos, as well as for passenger landings.

=== Airports ===
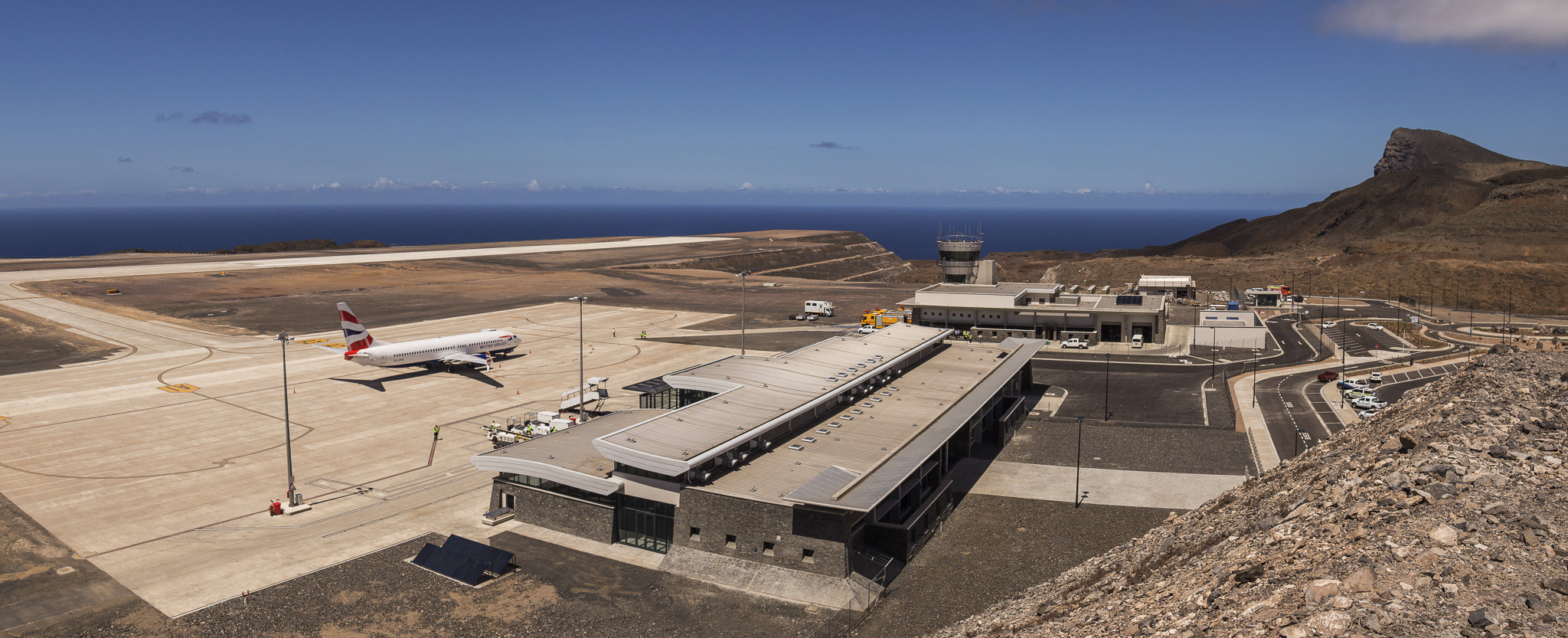
The airport of Saint Helena

St. Helena Airport received its first scheduled commercial flight on 14 October 2017. Commercial flights, operated by Airlink using an Embraer E190, are scheduled from OR Tambo Airport in Johannesburg each Saturday, returning the same day (or Sunday when the extension to Ascension Island is operating).

Commercial flights between St. Helena and Ascension Island operate on the second Saturday of each month, with the aircraft returning to St. Helena on the Sunday, before continuing on to Johannesburg.

There is a military airfield on Ascension Island (RAF Ascension Island), though potholes on the runway resulted in the April 2017 cancellation of all but essential personnel/supply flights as well as emergency medical evacuations. Regular RAF flights connected Ascension with RAF Brize Norton in the UK and RAF Mount Pleasant in the Falkland Islands, a transport link called the South Atlantic Air Bridge. The flights are mainly to transport military personnel, though the RAF did allow fare-paying civilians to use them. Ascension Island is also used by the US military (which supply the base using MV Ascension) and was a designated emergency landing site for the Space Shuttle program.

The islands of Tristan da Cunha can only be accessed by sea due to the lack of an airport.

Location	ICAO	IATA	Airport name	Runway length
Ascension Island	FHAW	ASI	RAF Ascension Island	3,054 metres (10,020 ft)
Saint Helena	FHSH	HLE	Saint Helena Airport	1,950 metres (6,400 ft)

=== Vehicular traffic ===
Saint Helena has 138 kilometres (86 mi)—118 kilometres (73 mi) paved and 20 kilometres (12 mi) unpaved—of roads. Tristan da Cunha has approximately 10 kilometres (6 mi) of paved roads, while Ascension has around 40 kilometres (25 mi) paved. Each island has its own vehicle registration plate system. Traffic drives on the left in all three territories, as in the United Kingdom. Two of the nearest countries to the islands—South Africa and Namibia—also drive on the left.

== See also ==
- ISO 3166-2:SH
- British Overseas Territories
- List of towns in Saint Helena, Ascension and Tristan da Cunha
- Public holidays in Saint Helena, Ascension and Tristan da Cunha
