= Local telephone area codes in France =

Local telephone area codes in France allowed, until 2022, the identification of a traditional landline subscriber's geographic area, with the exception of non-geographic phone numbers beginning with the prefix 09 - such as VoIP numbers provided with triple play subscriptions. Since 1 January 2023, geographic location is no longer required to correspond to local area codes.

Area code zones of metropolitan France.

Area codes are issued by default with the prefix 0 by telephone carriers. The area codes are defined as the second "Z" digit in the dialing encoding pattern E Z AB PQ MCDU.

French territory (except for Pacific Ocean dependencies, which have their own dialing patterns) was divided into five broad areas grouping multiple regions between 18 October 1996 and 1 January 2023. These divisions are defined by ARCEP.

Area codes:

- 01 : Île-de-France region
- 02 : Northwest region: (Brittany, Centre-Val de Loire, Normandy, Pays de la Loire) and "Indian Ocean" (Réunion and Mayotte).
- 03 : Northeast region: Bourgogne-Franche-Comté, Grand Est, and Hauts-de-France.
- 04 : Southeast region: Auvergne-Rhône-Alpes, Corsica, Provence-Alpes-Côte d'Azur, and Occitania (Languedoc-Roussillon).
- 05 : Southwest region: Nouvelle-Aquitaine and Occitania (Midi-Pyrénées). Other departments, collectivities, and overseas territories: Guadeloupe, Martinique, and French Guiana.

Note 1 : The departmental code is defined by the third and fourth "AB" digits in the dialing encoding pattern E Z AB PQ MCDU. These areas don't necessarily correspond to the departmental limits; each zone can contain multiple departments.

Note 2 : Smaller, more precise area codes also exist, defined by the third to the sixth "AB PQ" digits in the dialing encoding pattern E Z AB PQ MCDU. These codes (numbering around 17000 in France) are grouped by areas known as elementary dialing area codes (such as 420 for all of France, and 412 for the mainland).

Note 3 : Area codes don't consider newer regions. Thus, Occitania is split between two area codes: 04 for Languedoc-Roussillon and 05 for Midi-Pyrénées.

Other prefixes are dedicated to specific uses, for example 06 and 07 to mobile numbers. (List of area codes of mobile carriers in France).

The portability of local area code phone numbers — in terms of porting a landline number — is permitted since January 2020 within the five metropolitan areas, and since January 2024, within all of metropolitan France.

Starting 1 January 2023, certain area codes are reserved for telemarketing platforms and became the only codes authorised for this use.

== List of departmental area codes by geographic location ==
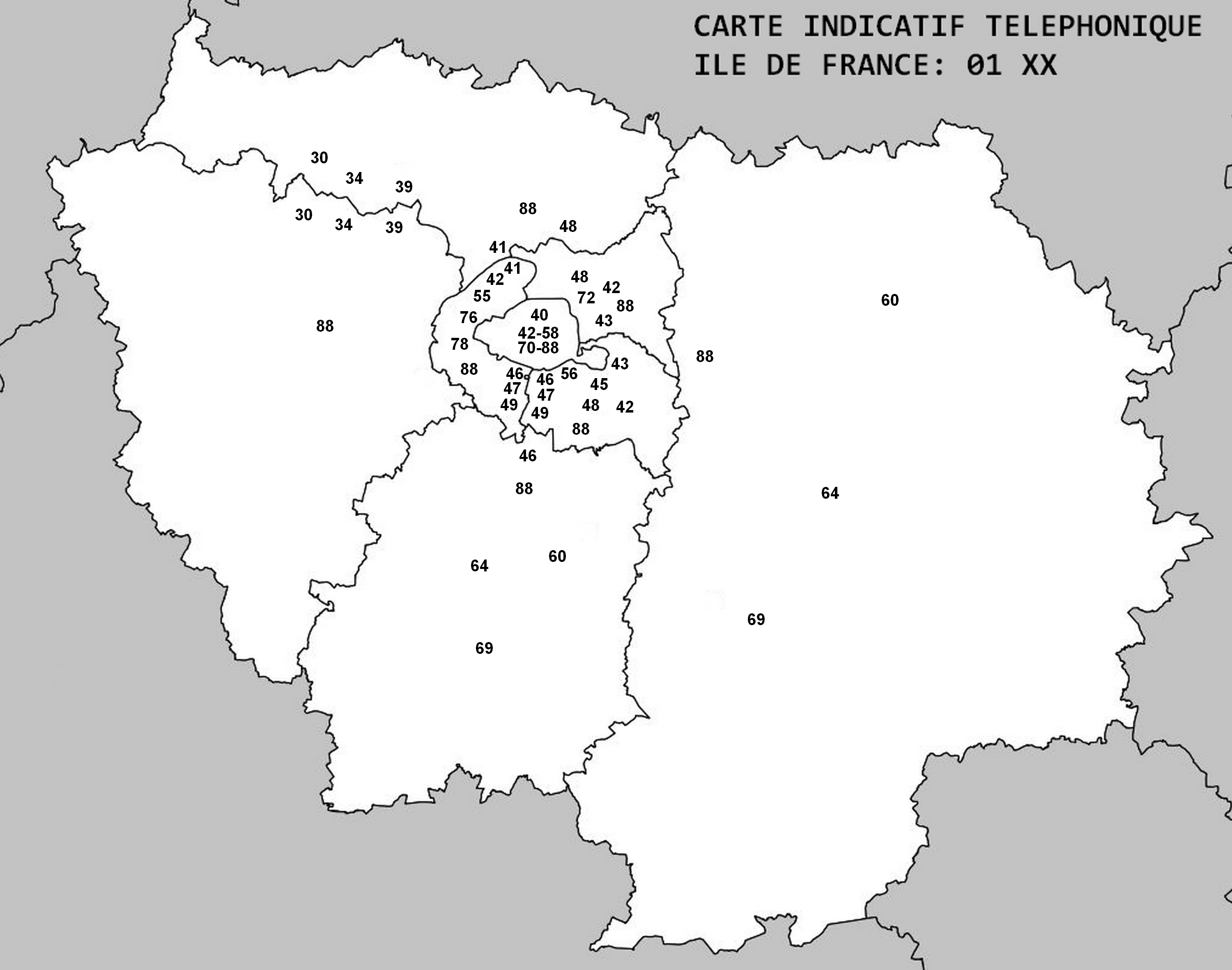
Departmental area codes in Île-de-France

Note :

- Area codes without an assignment date were assigned after 31 October 1996.

- Departments that did not have a code at a given point were assigned re-used codes.

Region Code	Department Code	Department(s)	Since,
01	30	Yvelines, Val-d'Oise	1973 - 1976
01	34	Yvelines, Val-d'Oise	1964
01	39	Yvelines, Val-d'Oise	1955
01	40	Paris	25 October 1985
01	41	Hauts-de-Seine, Val-d'Oise	25 October 1985
01	42	Paris, Hauts-de-Seine, Seine-Saint-Denis, Val-de-Marne	1955
01	43	Paris, Seine-Saint-Denis, Val-de-Marne	1955
01	44	Paris	25 October 1985
01	45	Paris, Val-de-Marne	1955
01	46	Paris, Essonne, Hauts-de-Seine, Val-de-Marne	1955
01	47	Paris, Hauts-de-Seine, Val-de-Marne	1955
01	48	Paris, Seine-Saint-Denis, Val-de-Marne, Val-d'Oise	1955
01	49	Paris, Hauts-de-Seine, Val-de-Marne	25 October 1985
01	53	Paris	26 May 1992
01	55	Paris, Hauts-de-Seine	26 May 1992
01	56	Paris, Val-de-Marne	
01	58	Paris	
01	60	Seine-et-Marne, Essonne	1973 - 1976
01	62	Telemarketing	2022
01	63	Telemarketing	2022
01	64	Seine-et-Marne, Essonne	1964
01	69	Essonne, Seine-et-Marne	1955
01	70	Paris	
01	72	Paris, Seine-Saint-Denis	
01	73	Paris	
01	74	Paris	
01	75	Paris	
01	76	Paris, Hauts-de-Seine	
01	77	Paris	
01	78	Paris, Hauts-de-Seine	
01	79	Paris	
01	80	Paris	
01	81	Paris	
01	82	Paris	
01	83	Paris	
01	88	Paris, Seine-et-Marne, Yvelines, Essonne, Hauts-de-Seine, Seine-Saint-Denis, Val-de-Marne, Val-d'Oise	2018
02	14	Calvados, Manche, Orne	
02	18	Cher, Eure-et-Loir, Indre, Indre-et-Loire, Loir-et-Cher, Loiret	
02	19	Cher, Eure-et-Loir, Indre, Indre-et-Loire, Loir-et-Cher, Loiret	
02	21	Côtes-d'Armor, Finistère, Ille-et-Vilaine, Morbihan	
02	22	Côtes-d'Armor, Finistère, Ille-et-Vilaine, Morbihan	
02	23	Ille-et-Vilaine	
02	28	Loire-Atlantique, Vendée	
02	29	Finistère	
02	30	Côtes-d'Armor, Finistère, Ille-et-Vilaine, Morbihan	
02	31	Calvados	1955
02	32	Eure	1955
02	33	Manche, Orne	7 March 1977
02	34	Cher, Eure-et-Loir, Indre, Indre-et-Loire, Loir-et-Cher, Loiret	
02	35	Seine-Maritime	1955
02	36	Cher, Eure-et-Loir, Indre, Indre-et-Loire, Loir-et-Cher, Loiret	
02	37	Eure-et-Loir	1955
02	38	Loiret	1955
02	40	Loire-Atlantique	1955
02	41	Maine-et-Loire	1955
02	43	Mayenne, Sarthe	5 March 1995
02	44	Loire-Atlantique, Maine-et-Loire, Mayenne, Sarthe, Vendée	
02	45	Cher, Eure-et-Loir, Indre, Indre-et-Loire, Loir-et-Cher, Loiret	
02	46	Cher, Eure-et-Loir, Indre, Indre-et-Loire, Loir-et-Cher, Loiret	
02	47	Indre-et-Loire	1955
02	48	Cher	15 March 1979
02	49	Loire-Atlantique, Maine-et-Loire, Mayenne, Sarthe, Vendée	
02	50	Calvados, Manche, Orne	
02	51	Vendée, Loire-Atlantique	27 January 1977
02	52	Loire-Atlantique, Maine-et-Loire, Mayenne, Sarthe, Vendée	
02	53	Loire-Atlantique, Maine-et-Loire, Mayenne, Sarthe, Vendée	
02	54	Indre, Loir-et-Cher	19 February 1977
02	55	Loire-Atlantique, Maine-et-Loire, Mayenne, Sarthe, Vendée	
02	56	Côtes-d'Armor, Finistère, Ille-et-Vilaine, Morbihan	
02	57	Côtes-d'Armor, Finistère, Ille-et-Vilaine, Morbihan	
02	58	Calvados, Manche, Orne	
02	61	Calvados, Manche, Orne	
02	62	Réunion	18 October 1996
02	63	Réunion	20 August 2018
02	69	Mayotte	18 October 1996
02	70	Telemarketing	2022
02	71	Telemarketing	2022
02	72	Loire-Atlantique, Maine-et-Loire, Mayenne, Sarthe, Vendée	
02	76	Eure, Seine-Maritime	
02	77	Eure, Seine-Maritime	
02	78	Eure, Seine-Maritime	
02	79	Eure, Seine-Maritime	
02	85	Loire-Atlantique, Maine-et-Loire, Mayenne, Sarthe, Vendée	
02	90	Côtes-d'Armor, Finistère, Ille-et-Vilaine, Morbihan	
02	96	Côtes-d'Armor	1955
02	97	Morbihan	1955
02	98	Finistère	1955
02	99	Ille-et-Vilaine	1955
03	10	Ardennes, Aube, Marne, Haute-Marne	
03	20	Central Nord	8 September 1979
03	21	Pas-de-Calais	1955
03	22	Somme	1955
03	23	Aisne	1955
03	24	Ardennes	1955
03	25	Aube, Haute-Marne	6 May 1976
03	26	Marne	1955
03	27	South of Nord	8 September 1979
03	28	North of Nord	8 September 1979
03	29	Meuse, Vosges	1 July 1977
03	39	Doubs, Jura, Haute-Saône, Territoire de Belfort	
03	44	Oise	7 February 1976
03	45	Côte-d'Or, Nièvre, Saône-et-Loire, Yonne	
03	51	Ardennes, Aube, Marne, Haute-Marne	
03	52	Ardennes, Aube, Marne, Haute-Marne	
03	53	Ardennes, Aube, Marne, Haute-Marne	
03	54	Meurthe-et-Moselle, Meuse, Moselle, Vosges	
03	55	Meurthe-et-Moselle, Meuse, Moselle, Vosges	
03	56	Meurthe-et-Moselle, Meuse, Moselle, Vosges	
03	57	Meurthe-et-Moselle, Meuse, Moselle, Vosges	
03	58	Côte-d'Or, Nièvre, Saône-et-Loire, Yonne	
03	59	Nord, Pas-de-Calais	
03	60	Aisne, Oise, Somme	1 November 1985 - 18 August 1996
03	61	Nord, Pas-de-Calais	
03	62	Nord, Pas-de-Calais	
03	63	Doubs, Jura, Haute-Saône, Territoire de Belfort	
03	64	Aisne, Oise, Somme	
03	65	Aisne, Oise, Somme	
03	66	Nord, Pas-de-Calais	
03	67	Bas-Rhin, Haut-Rhin	
03	68	Bas-Rhin, Haut-Rhin	
03	69	Bas-Rhin, Haut-Rhin	
03	70	Doubs, Jura, Haute-Saône, Territoire de Belfort	
03	71	Côte-d'Or, Nièvre, Saône-et-Loire, Yonne	
03	72	Meurthe-et-Moselle, Meuse, Moselle, Vosges	
03	73	Côte-d'Or, Nièvre, Saône-et-Loire, Yonne	
03	75	Aisne, Oise, Somme	
03	76	Nord, Pas-de-Calais	
03	77	Telemarketing	2022
03	78	Telemarketing	2022
03	79	Côte-d'Or, Nièvre, Saône-et-Loire, Yonne	
03	80	Côte-d'Or	1955
03	81	Doubs	1955
03	82	North of Meurthe-et-Moselle, Moselle	7 December 1978
03	83	South of Meurthe-et-Moselle	7 December 1978
03	84	Jura, Haute-Saône, Territoire de Belfort	8 September 1976
03	85	North of l'Ain, Saône-et-Loire	1955
03	86	Yonne, Nièvre	14 August 1974
03	87	Moselle	1955
03	88	Bas-Rhin	1955
03	89	Haut-Rhin	1955
03	90	Bas-Rhin, Haut-Rhin	
03	92	Bas-Rhin	
04	11	Aude, Gard, Hérault, Lozère, Pyrénées-Orientales	
04	13	Alpes-de-Haute-Provence, Hautes-Alpes, Bouches-du-Rhône, Vaucluse	
04	15	Allier, Cantal, Haute-Loire, Puy-de-Dôme	
04	20	Corse-du-Sud, Haute-Corse	
04	22	Alpes-Maritimes, Var	
04	23	Alpes-Maritimes, Var	
04	24	Telemarketing	2022
04	25	Telemarketing	2022
04	26	Ain, Allier, Ardèche, Drôme, Loire, Rhône	
04	27	Ain, Ardèche, Drôme, Loire, Rhône	
04	30	Aude, Gard, Hérault, Lozère, Pyrénées-Orientales	
04	32	Bouches-du-Rhône, Vaucluse	
04	34	Aude, Gard, Hérault, Lozère, Pyrénées-Orientales	
04	37	Rhône	
04	38	Isère	
04	42	Central and eastern Bouches-du-Rhône, except Marseille	15 June 1977
04	43	Allier, Cantal, Haute-Loire, Puy-de-Dôme	
04	44	Allier, Cantal, Haute-Loire, Puy-de-Dôme	
04	48	Aude, Gard, Hérault, Lozère, Pyrénées-Orientales	
04	50	Far northeast of l'Ain, Haute-Savoie	1971
04	56	Isère, Savoie, Haute-Savoie	
04	57	Isère, Savoie, Haute-Savoie	
04	58	Isère, Savoie, Haute-Savoie	
04	63	Allier, Cantal, Haute-Loire, Puy-de-Dôme	
04	65	Alpes-de-Haute-Provence, Hautes-Alpes, Bouches-du-Rhône, Vaucluse	
04	66	Gard, Lozère	1 February 1975
04	67	Gard, Hérault	1980 or 1981
04	68	Aude, Pyrénées-Orientales	14 May 1976
04	69	Ain, Ardèche, Drôme, Loire, Rhône	1 November 1985 - 18 August 1996
04	70	Allier	1955
04	71	Cantal, Haute-Loire	8 July 1975
04	72	Lyon	26 August 1980
04	73	Puy-de-Dôme	1955
04	74	Ain, Rhône except Lyon, North of Isère	1974
04	75	Ardèche, Drôme	1955
04	76	Isère	1955
04	77	Loire	1955
04	78	Lyon	10 December 1979
04	79	Far east of l'Ain, Savoie	1971
04	80	Isère, Savoie, Haute-Savoie	
04	81	Ain, Ardèche, Drôme, Loire, Rhône	
04	82	Ain, Ardèche, Drôme, Loire, Rhône	
04	83	Alpes-Maritimes, Var	
04	84	Alpes-de-Haute-Provence, Hautes-Alpes, Bouches-du-Rhône, Vaucluse	
04	85	Isère, Savoie, Haute-Savoie	
04	86	Alpes-de-Haute-Provence, Hautes-Alpes, Bouches-du-Rhône, Vaucluse	
04	87	Ain, Ardèche, Drôme, Loire, Rhône	
04	88	Alpes-de-Haute-Provence, Hautes-Alpes, Bouches-du-Rhône, Vaucluse	
04	89	Alpes-Maritimes, Bouches-du-Rhône, Var	
04	90	West of Bouches-du-Rhône, Vaucluse	17 September 1973
04	91	Marseille	15 June 1977
04	92	Alpes-de-Haute-Provence, Hautes-Alpes, Alpes-Maritimes	1989
04	93	Alpes-Maritimes	1955
04	94	Var	1955
04	95	Corse-du-Sud, Haute-Corse	1955
04	96	Marseille	19 June 1997
04	97	Alpes-Maritimes	
04	98	Var	
04	99	Hérault	
05	08	Saint-Pierre-et-Miquelon	18 October 1996
05	16	Charente, Charente-Maritime, Deux-Sèvres, Vienne	
05	17	Charente, Charente-Maritime, Deux-Sèvres, Vienne	
05	18	Corrèze, Creuse, Haute-Vienne	
05	19	Corrèze, Creuse, Haute-Vienne	
05	24	Dordogne, Gironde, Landes, Lot-et-Garonne, Pyrénées-Atlantiques	
05	31	Ariège, Aveyron, Haute-Garonne, Gers, Lot, Hautes-Pyrénées, Tarn, Tarn-et-Garonne	
05	32	Ariège, Aveyron, Haute-Garonne, Gers, Lot, Hautes-Pyrénées, Tarn, Tarn-et-Garonne	
05	33	Dordogne, Gironde, Landes, Lot-et-Garonne, Pyrénées-Atlantiques	
05	34	Haute-Garonne	1 November 1985 - 18 August 1996
05	35	Dordogne, Gironde, Landes, Lot-et-Garonne, Pyrénées-Atlantiques	
05	36	Ariège, Aveyron, Haute-Garonne, Gers, Lot, Hautes-Pyrénées, Tarn, Tarn-et-Garonne	
05	40	Dordogne, Gironde, Landes, Lot-et-Garonne, Pyrénées-Atlantiques	
05	45	Charente	1955
05	46	Charente-Maritime	1955
05	47	Dordogne, Gironde, Landes, Lot-et-Garonne, Pyrénées-Atlantiques	
05	49	Deux-Sèvres, Vienne	13 May 1976
05	53	Dordogne, Lot-et-Garonne	September 1981
05	54	Dordogne, Gironde, Landes, Lot-et-Garonne, Pyrénées-Atlantiques	
05	55	Corrèze, Creuse, Haute-Vienne	2 January 1975
05	56	Gironde	1955
05	57	North of Gironde	15 March 1982
05	58	Landes	September 1981
05	59	Pyrénées-Atlantiques	1955
05	61	Ariège, Haute-Garonne	1955
05	62	Gers, Hautes-Pyrénées	1955
05	63	Tarn, Tarn-et-Garonne	1955
05	64	Dordogne, Gironde, Landes, Lot-et-Garonne, Pyrénées-Atlantiques	
05	65	Aveyron, Lot	30 June 1975
05	67	Ariège, Aveyron, Haute-Garonne, Gers, Lot, Hautes-Pyrénées, Tarn, Tarn-et-Garonne	
05	68	Telemarketing	2022
05	69	Telemarketing	2022
05	79	Charente, Charente-Maritime, Deux-Sèvres, Vienne	
05	81	Ariège, Aveyron, Haute-Garonne, Gers, Lot, Hautes-Pyrénées, Tarn, Tarn-et-Garonne	
05	82	Ariège, Aveyron, Haute-Garonne, Gers, Lot, Hautes-Pyrénées, Tarn, Tarn-et-Garonne	
05	86	Charente, Charente-Maritime, Deux-Sèvres, Vienne	
05	87	Corrèze, Creuse, Haute-Vienne	
05	90	Guadeloupe, Saint Barthélemy, Collectivity Saint Martin	18 October 1996
05	94	French Guiana	18 October 1996
05	96	Martinique	18 October 1996

== List of departmental area codes by department ==
INSEE Code	Department	Region	Departmental Code(s)
01	Ain	04	26 - 27 - 50 - 69 - 72 - 74 - 78 - 79 - 81 - 82 - (03) 85 - 87
02	Aisne	03	23 - 60 - 64 - 65 - 75
03	Allier	04	15 - 26 - 43 - 44 - 63 - 70
04	Alpes-de-Haute-Provence	04	13 - 65 - 84 - 86 - 88 - 92
05	Hautes-Alpes	04	13 - 65 - 84 - 86 - 88 - 92
06	Alpes-Maritimes	04	22 - 23 - 83 - 89 - 92 - 93 - 97
07	Ardèche	04	26 - 27 - 69 - 75 - 81 - 82 - 87
08	Ardennes	03	10 - 24 - 51 - 52 - 53
09	Ariège	05	31 - 32 - 36 - 61 - 67 - 81 - 82
10	Aube	03	10 - 25 - 51 - 52 - 53
11	Aude	04	11 - 30 - 34 - 48 - 68
12	Aveyron	05	31 - 32 - 36 - 65 - 67 - 81 - 82
13	Bouches-du-Rhône	04	13 - 32 - 42 - 65 - 84 - 86 - 88 - 89 - 90 - 91
14	Calvados	02	14 - 31 - 50 - 58 - 61
15	Cantal	04	15 - 43 - 44 - 63 - 71
16	Charente	05	16 - 17 - 45 - 79 - 86
17	Charente-Maritime	05	16 - 17 - 46 - 79 - 86
18	Cher	02	18 - 19 - 34 - 36 - 45 - 46 - 48
19	Corrèze	05	18 - 19 - 55 - 87
2A	Corse-du-Sud	04	20 - 95
2B	Haute-Corse	04	20 - 95
21	Côte-d'Or	03	45 - 58 - 71 - 73 - 79 - 80
22	Côtes-d'Armor	02	21 - 22 - 30 - 56 - 57 - 90 - 96
23	Creuse	05	18 - 19 - 55 - 87
24	Dordogne	05	24 - 33 - 35 - 40 - 47 - 53 - 54 - 64
25	Doubs	03	39 - 63 - 70 - 81
26	Drôme	04	26 - 27 - 69 - 75 - 81 - 82 - 87
27	Eure	02	32 - 37 - 76 - 77 - 78 - 79
28	Eure-et-Loir	02	18 - 32 - 19 - 34 - 36 - 37 - 45 - 46
29	Finistère	02	21 - 22 - 29 - 30 - 56 - 57 - 90 - 98
30	Gard	04	11 - 30 - 34 - 48 - 66 - 67
31	Haute-Garonne	05	31 - 32 - 34 - 36 - 61 - 62 - 67 - 81 - 82
32	Gers	05	31 - 32 - 36 - 62 - 67 - 81 - 82
33	Gironde	05	24 - 33 - 35 - 40 - 47 - 54 - 56 - 57 - 64
34	Hérault	04	11 - 30 - 34 - 48 - 67 - 99
35	Ille-et-Vilaine	02	21 - 22 - 23 - 30 - 56 - 57 - 90 - 99
36	Indre	02	18 - 19 - 34 - 36 - 45 - 46 - 54
37	Indre-et-Loire	02	18 - 19 - 34 - 36 - 45 - 46 - 47
38	Isère	04	38 - 56 - 57 - 58 - 72 - 74 - 76 - 80 - 85
39	Jura	03	39 - 63 - 70 - 84
40	Landes	05	24 - 33 - 35 - 40 - 47 - 54 - 58 - 64
41	Loir-et-Cher	02	18 - 19 - 34 - 36 - 45 - 46 - 54
42	Loire	04	26 - 27 - 69 - 77 - 81 - 82 - 87
43	Haute-Loire	04	15 - 43 - 44 - 63 - 71
44	Loire-Atlantique	02	28 - 40 - 44 - 49 - 51 - 52 - 53 - 55 - 72 - 85
45	Loiret	02	18 - 19 - 34 - 36 - 38 - 45
46	Lot	05	31 - 32 - 36 - 65 - 67 - 81 - 82
47	Lot-et-Garonne	05	24 - 33 - 35 - 40 - 47 - 53 - 54 - 64
48	Lozère	04	11 - 30 - 34 - 48 - 66
49	Maine-et-Loire	02	41 - 44 - 49 - 52 - 53 - 55 - 72 - 85
50	Manche	02	14 - 33 - 50 - 58 - 61
51	Marne	03	10 - 26 - 51 - 52 - 53
52	Haute-Marne	03	10 - 25 - 51 - 52 - 53
53	Mayenne	02	43 - 44 - 49 - 52 - 53 - 55 - 72 - 85
54	Meurthe-et-Moselle	03	54 - 55 - 56 - 57 - 72 - 82 - 83
55	Meuse	03	29 - 54 - 55 - 56 - 57 - 72
56	Morbihan	02	21 - 22 - 30 - 56 - 57 - 90 - 97
57	Moselle	03	54 - 55 - 56 - 57 - 72 - 82 - 87
58	Nièvre	03	45 - 58 - 71 - 73 - 79 - 86
59	Nord	03	20 - 27 - 28 - 59 - 61 - 62 - 66 - 76
60	Oise	03	44 - 60 - 64 - 65 - 75
61	Orne	02	14 - 33 - 50 - 58 - 61
62	Pas-de-Calais	03	21 - 59 - 61 - 62 - 66 - 76
63	Puy-de-Dôme	04	15 - 43 - 44 - 63 - 73
64	Pyrénées-Atlantiques	05	24 - 33 - 35 - 40 - 47 - 54 - 59 - 64
65	Hautes-Pyrénées	05	31 - 32 - 36 - 62 - 67 - 81 - 82
66	Pyrénées-Orientales	04	11 - 30 - 34 - 48 - 68
67	Bas-Rhin	03	67 - 68 - 69 - 88 - 90
68	Haut-Rhin	03	67 - 68 - 69 - 89 - 90
69	Rhône	04	26 - 27 - 37 - 69 - 72 - 74 - 78 - 81 - 82 - 87
70	Haute-Saône	03	39 - 63 - 70 - 84
71	Saône-et-Loire	03	45 - 58 - 71 - 73 - 79 - 85
72	Sarthe	02	43 - 44 - 49 - 52 - 53 - 55 - 72 - 85
73	Savoie	04	56 - 57 - 58 - 79 - 80 - 85
74	Haute-Savoie	04	50 - 56 - 57 - 58 - 80 - 85
75	Paris	01	40 - 42 à 49 - 53 - 55 - 56 - 70 - 72 à 83 - 88
76	Seine-Maritime	02	35 - 76 - 77 - 78 - 79
77	Seine-et-Marne	01	60 - 64 - 69 - 88
78	Yvelines	01	30 - 34 - 39 - 88
79	Deux-Sèvres	05	16 - 17 - 49 - 79 - 86
80	Somme	03	22 - 60 - 64 - 65 - 75
81	Tarn	05	31 - 32 - 36 - 63 - 67 - 81 - 82
82	Tarn-et-Garonne	05	31 - 32 - 36 - 63 - 67 - 81 - 82
83	Var	04	22 - 23 - 83 - 89 - 94 - 98
84	Vaucluse	04	13 - 32 - 65 - 84 - 86 - 88 - 90
85	Vendée	02	44 - 49 - 51 - 52 - 53 - 55 - 72 - 85
86	Vienne	05	16 - 17 - 49 - 79 - 86
87	Haute-Vienne	05	18 - 19 - 55 - 87
88	Vosges	03	29 - 54 - 55 - 56 - 57 - 72
89	Yonne	03	45 - 58 - 71 - 73 - 79 - 86
90	Territoire de Belfort	03	39 - 63 - 70 - 84
91	Essonne	01	46 - 60 - 64 - 69 - 88
92	Hauts-de-Seine	01	41 - 42 - 46 - 47 - 49 - 55 - 76 - 78 - 88
93	Seine-Saint-Denis	01	42 - 43 - 48 - 88
94	Val-de-Marne	01	42 - 43 - 45 - 48 - 49 - 56 - 88
95	Val-d'Oise	01	30 - 34 - 39 - 41 - 48 - 88
971	Guadeloupe	05	90
972	Martinique	05	96
973	French Guiana	05	94
974	Réunion	02	62 - 63
975	Saint-Pierre-et-Miquelon	05	08
976	Mayotte	02	69
977	Saint Barthélemy	05	90
978	Collectivity of Saint Martin	05	90

== See also ==
- Telephone numbers in France
- Liste des préfixes des opérateurs de téléphonie par internet en France
- Liste des préfixes des opérateurs de téléphonie mobile en France
- Anciens indicatifs téléphoniques à Paris
- Anciens indicatifs téléphoniques régionaux en France
