= Telephone numbers in Uganda =

- Uganda (dark green)
- Country: Uganda
- Continent: Africa
- Country code: +256
- International access: 000
- Long-distance: 0

== List of area codes in Uganda ==
List of area codes
Area Code	Area/City/ mobile provider
414	Kampala
456	Kaliro
434	Jinja
454	Mbale
464	Mityana
4644	Mubende
4654	Masindi
4714	Gulu
4734	Lira
4764	Arua
4814	Masaka
4834	Fort Portal
4854	Mbarara
4864	Kabale/Rukungiri/Kisoro
4895	Iganga
70X	Airtel Uganda
71X	UTel Uganda (disfunct)
72X	Lycamobile Uganda
74X	Airtel Uganda
75X	Airtel Uganda
76X	MTN Uganda
77X	MTN Uganda
78X	MTN Uganda
79X	MTN Uganda
