= Telephone numbers in Algeria =

- Fixed-line (landline) area codes map
- Country: Algeria
- Continent: Africa
- Regulator: Ministry of Post and Telecommunications
- Numbering plan type: Closed
- NSN length: 8 (Landline); 9 (Mobile)
- Format: 0yy xx xx xx (Landline); 0yxx xx xx xx (Mobile)
- Numbering plan: https://www.arpce.dz/en/service/num
- Last updated: February 13 2008
- Country code: +213
- International access: 00
- Long-distance: 0

Telephone numbers in Algeria are regulated by the Ministry of Post and Telecommunications.

== Dialing pattern ==
=== Fixed-line (landline) numbers ===
- From Algeria: 0yy xx xx xx ("yy" is the area code, i.e. 21, 41, 46)
- Outside Algeria: +213 yy xx xx xx

=== Mobile numbers ===
- From Algeria: 0yxx xx xx xx ("y" is the operator code, 5 for Ooredoo, 6 for Mobilis, 7 for Djezzy)
- Outside Algeria: +213 yxx xx xx xx

=== VoIP numbers ===
For VoIP accounts providers the ministry reserved the operator code 09

- From Algeria: 09xx xx xx xx
- Outside Algeria +213 9xx xx xx xx

== List of phone numbers in Algeria ==
Area/City	Area code and number layout
Adrar	049 xx xx xx
Chlef	027 xx xx xx
Laghouat	029 xx xx xx
Oum El Bouaghi	032 xx xx xx
Batna	033 xx xx xx
Béjaïa	034 xx xx xx
Biskra	033 xx xx xx
Béchar	049 xx xx xx
Blida	025 xx xx xx
Bouïra	026 xx xx xx
Tamanrasset	029 xx xx xx
Tébessa	037 xx xx xx
Tlemcen	043 xx xx xx
Tiaret	046 xx xx xx
Tizi Ouzou	026 xx xx xx
Algiers	021/023 xx xx xx
Djelfa	027 xx xx xx
Jijel	034 xx xx xx
Sétif	036 xx xx xx
Saida	048 xx xx xx
Skikda	039 xx xx xx
Sidi Bel Abbès	048 xx xx xx
Annaba	038 xx xx xx
Guelma	037 xx xx xx
Constantine	031 xx xx xx
Médéa	025 xx xx xx
Mostaganem	045 xx xx xx
M'Sila	035 xx xx xx
Mascara	045 xx xx xx
Ouargla	029 xx xx xx
Oran	041 xx xx xx
El Bayadh	049 xx xx xx
Illizi	029 xx xx xx
Bordj Bou Arréridj	035 xx xx xx
Boumerdès	024 xx xx xx
El Taref	038 xx xx xx
Tindouf	049 xx xx xx
Tissemsilt	046 xx xx xx
El Oued	032 xx xx xx
Khenchela	032 xx xx xx
Souk Ahras	037 xx xx xx
Tipaza	024 xx xx xx
Mila	031 xx xx xx
Aïn Defla	027 xx xx xx
Naama	049 xx xx xx
Aïn Témouchent	043 xx xx xx
Ghardaïa	029 xx xx xx
Relizane	046 xx xx xx

Mobile operator	Number layout
Ooredoo Algeria	05xx xx xx xx
Mobilis	06xx xx xx xx
Djezzy	07xx xx xx xx

Emergency numbers	Numbers
Police	1548
Civil Defence (Fire)	1021
Forest Fire	1070
Gendarme	1055
Coast Guard	1054
Customs	1023
