= Telephone numbers in Saint Helena and Tristan da Cunha =

Telephone numbers in Saint Helena, Ascension and Tristan da Cunha
Location
- Country: Saint Helena, Ascension and Tristan da Cunha
- Continent: Africa

Access codes
- Country code: +290
- International access: 00
- Long-distance: n/a

In the island of Saint Helena and the archipelago of Tristan da Cunha, telecommunications are administered by Sure Saint Helena. There is a fixed five-digit number plan, and the country calling code is +290.

Ascension Island is also part of the British Overseas Territory of Saint Helena, Ascension and Tristan da Cunha, but it has a separate calling code and numbering scheme.

== 2013 change to numbering plan ==
From 1 October 2013, all existing 4-digit telephone numbers on St Helena were to be prefixed by a '2' to move from a 4-digit to a 5-digit numbering plan. The change in numbering resulted from an increased demand for new telephone services and also provided a platform for the future introduction of a cellular network on the island.

== Allocations ==
Number range	Area	Comments
1XX – 19XX	non-geographic	PSTN Service Numbers
9XX	non-geographic	Emergency Services
1XXXX	Reserved	Reserved for future Telephone Services
20XXX		PSTN Services
21XXX		PSTN Services
22XXX	Jamestown, St Helena	PSTN Services
23XXX - 25XXX		PSTN Services
260XX – 261XX		Information Service
262XX	non-geographic	Voice Messaging
263XX	non-geographic	Flexible Access
264XX - 29XXX		PSTN Services
3XXXX		Reserved for future Telephone Services
4XXXX		Reserved for future Telephone Services
5XXXX	non-geographic	Mobile
6XXXX	non-geographic	Mobile
7XXXX		Reserved for future Telephone Services
8XXXX	Tristan Da Cunha	Reserved for future Telephone Services
9XXXX		Reserved for future Telephone Services

== Tristan da Cunha ==
Although Tristan da Cunha shares the +290 code with St Helena, residents have access to the Foreign and Commonwealth Office Telecommunications Network, provided by Global Crossing. This uses a London 020 numbering range, meaning that numbers are accessed via the UK telephone numbering plan.

== See also ==
- Telephone numbers in the United Kingdom
- Telephone numbers in Ascension Island
