= Telephone numbers in Morocco =

- Country: Morocco
- Continent: Africa
- NSN length: 9
- Format: +212 XXX-XXXXXX (GSM) +212 XXXX-XXXXX (Fixed)
- Country code: +212
- International access: 00
- Long-distance: 0

All phone numbers in Morocco are 9 digits in length (excluding the leading 0).

Morocco uses a closed numbering plan, i.e. the prefix is not omitted for local calls. This is necessary because the same geographic area can be served by several prefixes. Casablanca, for instance, has 10 prefixes.

Fixed and mobile prefixes belong exclusively to one phone company. On the following list, fixed networks are indicated by the following letters: I = Maroc Telecom (fixed), O = Orange Maroc (NGN), W = INWI (Maroc Connect) (fixed NGN), X = INWI (Maroc Connect) (fixed GSM(?))

== List ==
From other countries	From Morocco		In operation since
	0	trunk prefix	
	00	international prefix	
not possible	1x and 1xx	Special services	
not possible	15	fire brigade, ambulance	
not possible	19	police	
not possible	177	gendarmerie royale	
+212-5xxxxxxxx	05xxxxxxxx	Fixed numbers	
+212-520-xxxxxx	0520-xxxxxx	Casablanca (O)	2006-05-29
+212-521-xxxxxx	0521-xxxxxx	Casablanca/Central Morocco (O)	2006-05-29
+212-5222-xxxxx	05222-xxxxx	Casablanca (I)	
+212-5223-xxxxx	05223-xxxxx	Casablanca (I)	
+212-5224-xxxxx	05224-xxxxx	Casablanca (I)	
+212-5225-xxxxx	05225-xxxxx	Casablanca (I)	
+212-5226-xxxxx	05226-xxxxx	Casablanca (I)	
+212-5227-xxxxx	05227-xxxxx	Casablanca (I)	
+212-5228-xxxxx	05228-xxxxx	Casablanca (I)	
+212-5229-xxxxx	05229-xxxxx	Casablanca (I)	
+212-5232-xxxxx	05232-xxxxx	Mohammedia (I)	
+212-5233-xxxxx	05233-xxxxx	El Jedida and Mohammedia (I)	
+212-5234-xxxxx	05234-xxxxx	Settat (I)	
+212-5235-xxxxx	05235-xxxxx	Oued Zem (I)	
+212-5237-xxxxx	05237-xxxxx	Settat (I)	
+212-5242-xxxxx	05242-xxxxx	El Kelaa des Sraghna (I)	
+212-5243-xxxxx	05243-xxxxx	Marrakech (I)	
+212-5244-xxxxx	05244-xxxxx	Marrakech (I)	
+212-5246-xxxxx	05246-xxxxx	El Youssoufia and Safi (I)	
+212-5247-xxxxx	05247-xxxxx	Essaouira (I)	
+212-5248-xxxxx	05248-xxxxx	Ouarzazate (I)	
+212-525-xxxxxx	0525-xxxxxx	Southern Morocco (O)	2006-05-29
+212-526-xxxxxx	0526-xxxxxx	Services with restricted mobility (X)	
+212-527-xxxxxx	0527-xxxxxx	Services with restricted mobility (X)	
+212-5282-xxxxx	05282-xxxxx	Agadir, Ait Meloul and Inezgane (I)	
+212-5283-xxxxx	05283-xxxxx	Inezgane and Taroudannt (I)	
+212-5285-xxxxx	05285-xxxxx	Oulad Teima, Taroudannt (I)	
+212-5286-xxxxx	05286-xxxxx	Tiznit (I)	
+212-52867-xxxxx	052867-xxxxx	Lakhssas (I)	
+212-5287-xxxxx	05287-xxxxx	Guelmim, Tan Tan (I)	
+212-5288-xxxxx	05288-xxxxx	Agadir, Es-Semara, Tarfaya (I)	
+212-5289-xxxxx	05289-xxxxx	Dakhla, Laayoune (I)	
+212-5290-xxxxx	05290-xxxxx	Casablanca (W)	
+212-52980-xxxx	052980-xxxx	Marrakech and surrounding area (W)	
+212-52990-xxxx	052990-xxxx	Agadir and surrounding area (W)	
+212-530-xxxxxx	0530-xxxxxx	Rabat, Kenitra (O)	2006-05-29
+212-531-xxxxxx	0531-xxxxxx	Tangier, Al Hoceima, Larache, Tetouan (O)	2006-05-29
+212-532-xxxxxx	0532-xxxxxx	Fes, Errachidia, Meknes, Nador, Oujda, Taza (O)	2006-05-29
+212-533-xxxxxx	0533-xxxxxx	Services with restricted mobility (X)	
+212-534-xxxxxx	0534-xxxxxx	Services with restricted mobility (X)	
+212-5352-xxxxx	05352-xxxxx	Taza (I)	
+212-5353-xxxxx	05353-xxxxx	Midelt (I)	
+212-5354-xxxxx	05354-xxxxx	Meknès (I)	
+212-5355-xxxxx	05355-xxxxx	Meknès (I)	
+212-5356-xxxxx	05356-xxxxx	Fès (I)	
+212-5357-xxxxx	05357-xxxxx	Goulmima (I)	
+212-5358-xxxxx	05358-xxxxx	Ifrane (I)	
+212-5359-xxxxx	05359-xxxxx	Fès (I)	
+212-5362-xxxxx	05362-xxxxx	Berkane (I)	
+212-5363-xxxxx	05363-xxxxx	Nador (I)	
+212-5365-xxxxx	05365-xxxxx	Oujda (I)	
+212-5366-xxxxx	05366-xxxxx	Figuig, Oujda (I)	
+212-5367-xxxxx	05367-xxxxx	Bouarfa, Oujda (I)	
+212-5368-xxxxx	05368-xxxxx	Figuig (I)	
+212-5372-xxxxx	05372-xxxxx	Rabat (I)	
+212-5373-xxxxx	05373-xxxxx	Kénitra (I)	
+212-5374-xxxxx	05374-xxxxx	Ouazzane (I)	
+212-5375-xxxxx	05375-xxxxx	Sidi Slimane, Khémisset (I)	
+212-5376-xxxxx	05376-xxxxx	Rabat, Témara (I)	
+212-5377-xxxxx	05377-xxxxx	Rabat (I)	
+212-5378-xxxxx	05378-xxxxx	Salé (I)	
+212-5379-xxxxx	05379-xxxxx	Souk Larbaa (I)	
+212-5380-xxxxx	05380-xxxxx	Rabat and surrounding area (W)	
+212-53880-xxxx	053880-xxxx	Tangier and surrounding area (W)	
+212-53890-xxxx	053890-xxxx	Fès, Meknès and surrounding area (W)	
+212-5393-xxxxx	05393-xxxxx	Tangier (I)	
+212-5394-xxxxx	05394-xxxxx	Asilah (I)	
+212-5395-xxxxx	05395-xxxxx	Larache (I)	
+212-5396-xxxxx	05396-xxxxx	Fnideq, Martil, Mdiq (I)	
+212-5397-xxxxx	05397-xxxxx	Tétouan (I)	
+212-5398-xxxxx	05398-xxxxx	Al Hoceima, Chefchaouen (I)	
+212-5399-xxxxx	05399-xxxxx	Al Hoceima, Larache, Tangier (I)	
+212-6xxxxxxxx	06xxxxxxxx	Mobile networks (GSM)	
+212-60-xxxxxxx	060-xxxxxxx	INWI	
+212-610-xxxxxx	0610-xxxxxx	Maroc Telecom	
+212-611-xxxxxx	0611-xxxxxx	Maroc Telecom	
+212-612-xxxxxx	0612-xxxxxx	Orange Maroc	2006-04-10
+212-613-xxxxxx	0613-xxxxxx	Maroc Telecom	
+212-614-xxxxxx	0614-xxxxxx	Orange Maroc	2006-07-17
+212-615-xxxxxx	0615-xxxxxx	Maroc Telecom	
+212-616-xxxxxx	0616-xxxxxx	Maroc Telecom	
+212-617-xxxxxx	0617-xxxxxx	Orange Maroc	
+212-618-xxxxxx	0618-xxxxxx	Maroc Telecom	
+212-619-xxxxxx	0619-xxxxxx	Orange Maroc	
+212-620-xxxxxx	0620-xxxxxx	Orange Maroc	
+212-621-xxxxxx	0621-xxxxxx	Orange Maroc	
+212-622-xxxxxx	0622-xxxxxx	Maroc Telecom	
+212-623-xxxxxx	0623-xxxxxx	Maroc Telecom	
+212-624-xxxxxx	0624-xxxxxx	Maroc Telecom	
+212-625-xxxxxx	0625-xxxxxx	Orange Maroc	
+212-626-xxxxxx	0626-xxxxxx	INWI	
+212-627-xxxxxx	0627-xxxxxx	INWI	
+212-628-xxxxxx	0628-xxxxxx	Maroc Telecom	
+212-629-xxxxxx	0629-xxxxxx	INWI	
+212-630-xxxxxx	0630-xxxxxx	INWI	
+212-631-xxxxxx	0631-xxxxxx	Orange Maroc	
+212-632-xxxxxx	0632-xxxxxx	Orange Maroc	
+212-633-xxxxxx	0633-xxxxxx	INWI	
+212-634-xxxxxx	0634-xxxxxx	INWI	
+212-635-xxxxxx	0635-xxxxxx	INWI	
+212-636-xxxxxx	0636-xxxxxx	Maroc Telecom	
+212-637-xxxxxx	0637-xxxxxx	Maroc Telecom	
+212-638-xxxxxx	0638-xxxxxx	INWI	
+212-639-xxxxxx	0639-xxxxxx	Maroc Telecom	
+212-640-xxxxxx	0640-xxxxxx	INWI	
+212-641-xxxxxx	0641-xxxxxx	Maroc Telecom	
+212-642-xxxxxx	0642-xxxxxx	Maroc Telecom	
+212-643-xxxxxx	0643-xxxxxx	Maroc Telecom	
+212-644-xxxxxx	0644-xxxxxx	Orange Maroc	
+212-645-xxxxxx	0645-xxxxxx	Orange Maroc	
+212-646-xxxxxx	0646-xxxxxx	INWI	
+212-647-xxxxxx	0647-xxxxxx	INWI	
+212-648-xxxxxx	0648-xxxxxx	Maroc Telecom	
+212-649-xxxxxx	0649-xxxxxx	Orange Maroc	
+212-650-xxxxxx	0650-xxxxxx	Maroc Telecom	
+212-651-xxxxxx	0651-xxxxxx	Maroc Telecom	
+212-652-xxxxxx	0652-xxxxxx	Maroc Telecom	
+212-653-xxxxxx	0653-xxxxxx	Maroc Telecom	
+212-654-xxxxxx	0654-xxxxxx	Maroc Telecom	
+212-655-xxxxxx	0655-xxxxxx	Maroc Telecom	
+212-656-xxxxxx	0656-xxxxxx	Orange Maroc	
+212-657-xxxxxx	0657-xxxxxx	Orange Maroc	
+212-658-xxxxxx	0658-xxxxxx	Maroc Telecom	
+212-659-xxxxxx	0659-xxxxxx	Maroc Telecom	
+212-660-xxxxxx	0660-xxxxxx	Orange Maroc	
+212-661-xxxxxx	0661-xxxxxx	Maroc Telecom	
+212-662-xxxxxx	0662-xxxxxx	Maroc Telecom	
+212-663-xxxxxx	0663-xxxxxx	Orange Maroc	
+212-664-xxxxxx	0664-xxxxxx	Orange Maroc	
+212-665-xxxxxx	0665-xxxxxx	Orange Maroc	
+212-666-xxxxxx	0666-xxxxxx	Maroc Telecom	
+212-667-xxxxxx	0667-xxxxxx	Maroc Telecom	
+212-668-xxxxxx	0668-xxxxxx	Maroc Telecom	
+212-669-xxxxxx	0669-xxxxxx	Orange Maroc	
+212-670-xxxxxx	0670-xxxxxx	Maroc Telecom	
+212-671-xxxxxx	0671-xxxxxx	Maroc Telecom	
+212-672-xxxxxx	0672-xxxxxx	Maroc Telecom	
+212-673-xxxxxx	0673-xxxxxx	Maroc Telecom	
+212-674-xxxxxx	0674-xxxxxx	Orange Maroc	
+212-675-xxxxxx	0675-xxxxxx	Orange Maroc	2005-03-15
+212-676-xxxxxx	0676-xxxxxx	Maroc Telecom	2005-01-31
+212-677-xxxxxx	0677-xxxxxx	Maroc Telecom	2005-06-13
+212-678-xxxxxx	0678-xxxxxx	Maroc Telecom	2005-08-24
+212-679-xxxxxx	0679-xxxxxx	Orange Maroc	2005-12-01
+212-680-xxxxxx	0680-xxxxxx	INWI	
+212-681-xxxxxx	0681-xxxxxx	INWI	
+212-682-xxxxxx	0682-xxxxxx	Maroc Telecom	
+212-684-xxxxxx	0684-xxxxxx	Orange Maroc	
+212-687-xxxxxx	0687-xxxxxx	INWI	
+212-688-xxxxxx	0688-xxxxxx	Orange Maroc	
+212-689-xxxxxx	0689-xxxxxx	Maroc Telecom	
+212-690-xxxxxx	0690-xxxxxx	INWI	
+212-691-xxxxxx	0691-xxxxxx	Orange Maroc	
+212-693-xxxxxx	0693-xxxxxx	Orange Maroc	
+212-694-xxxxxx	0694-xxxxxx	Orange Maroc	
+212-695-xxxxxx	0695-xxxxxx	INWI	
+212-696-xxxxxx	0696-xxxxxx	Maroc Telecom	
+212-697-xxxxxx	0697-xxxxxx	Maroc Telecom	
+212-698-xxxxxx	0698-xxxxxx	INWI	
+212-699-xxxxxx	0699-xxxxxx	INWI	
+212-7xxxxxxxx	07xxxxxxxx	Mobile networks (GSM)	
+212-700-xxxxxx	0700-xxxxxx	INWI	
+212-701-xxxxxx	0701-xxxxxx	INWI	
+212-702-xxxxxx	0702-xxxxxx	INWI	
+212-703-xxxxxx	0703-xxxxxx	INWI	
+212-704-xxxxxx	0704-xxxxxx	INWI	
+212-705-xxxxxx	0705-xxxxxx	INWI	
+212-706-xxxxxx	0706-xxxxxx	INWI	
+212-707-xxxxxx	0707-xxxxxx	INWI	
+212-708-xxxxxx	0708-xxxxxx	INWI	
+212-709-xxxxxx	0709-xxxxxx	INWI	
+212-710-xxxxxx	0710-xxxxxx	INWI	
+212-711-xxxxxx	0711-xxxxxx	INWI	
+212-712-xxxxxx	0712-xxxxxx	INWI	
+212-713-xxxxxx	0713-xxxxxx	INWI	
+212-714-xxxxxx	0714-xxxxxx	INWI	
+212-715-xxxxxx	0715-xxxxxx	INWI	
+212-716-xxxxxx	0716-xxxxxx	INWI	
+212-717-xxxxxx	0717-xxxxxx	INWI	
+212-718-xxxxxx	0718-xxxxxx	INWI	
+212-719-xxxxxx	0719-xxxxxx	INWI	
+212-720-xxxxxx	0720-xxxxxx	INWI	
+212-721-xxxxxx	0721-xxxxxx	INWI	
+212-722-xxxxxx	0722-xxxxxx	INWI	
+212-723-xxxxxx	0723-xxxxxx	INWI	
+212-724-xxxxxx	0724-xxxxxx	INWI	
+212-750-xxxxxx	0750-xxxxxx	Maroc Telecom	
+212-751-xxxxxx	0751-xxxxxx	Maroc Telecom	
+212-752-xxxxxx	0752-xxxxxx	Maroc Telecom	
+212-753-xxxxxx	0753-xxxxxx	Maroc Telecom	
+212-760-xxxxxx	0760-xxxxxx	Maroc Telecom	
+212-761-xxxxxx	0761-xxxxxx	Maroc Telecom	
+212-762-xxxxxx	0762-xxxxxx	Maroc Telecom	
+212-763-xxxxxx	0763-xxxxxx	Maroc Telecom	
+212-764-xxxxxx	0764-xxxxxx	Maroc Telecom	
+212-765-xxxxxx	0765-xxxxxx	Maroc Telecom	
+212-766-xxxxxx	0766-xxxxxx	Maroc Telecom	
+212-767-xxxxxx	0767-xxxxxx	Maroc Telecom	
+212-768-xxxxxx	0768-xxxxxx	Maroc Telecom	
+212-769-xxxxxx	0769-xxxxxx	Maroc Telecom	
+212-770-xxxxxx	0770-xxxxxx	Orange Maroc	
+212-771-xxxxxx	0771-xxxxxx	Orange Maroc	
+212-772-xxxxxx	0772-xxxxxx	Orange Maroc	
+212-773-xxxxxx	0773-xxxxxx	Orange Maroc	
+212-774-xxxxxx	0774-xxxxxx	Orange Maroc	
+212-775-xxxxxx	0775-xxxxxx	Orange Maroc	
+212-776-xxxxxx	0776-xxxxxx	Orange Maroc	
+212-777-xxxxxx	0777-xxxxxx	Orange Maroc	
+212-778-xxxxxx	0778-xxxxxx	Orange Maroc	
+212-779-xxxxxx	0779-xxxxxx	Orange Maroc	
+212-780-xxxxxx	0780-xxxxxx	Orange Maroc	
+212-781-xxxxxx	0781-xxxxxx	Orange Maroc	
+212-782-xxxxxx	0782-xxxxxx	Orange Maroc	
+212-783-xxxxxx	0783-xxxxxx	Orange Maroc	
+212-8xxxxxxxx	08xxxxxxxx	Special services	
+212-80-xxxxxxx	080-xxxxxxx	toll-free and shared-cost services	
+212-89-xxxxxxx	089-xxxxxxx	premium rate services	
+212-8920-xxxxx	08920-xxxxx	GlobalStar North Africa GMPCS (satellite network)	2005-01-27
+212-8921-xxxxx	08921-xxxxx	GlobalStar North Africa GMPCS (satellite network)	2005-01-27
+212-8922-xxxxx	08922-xxxxx	GlobalStar North Africa GMPCS (satellite network)	2005-01-27

== History ==
=== 1990 - Transition to 6-digit numbers ===
In 1990, 6-digit phone numbers were introduced.

=== 2000 - Transition from 7-digit to 8-digit numbers ===
On 2000-10-13 at 23:00 UTC, the numbering area in Morocco was split into 5 parts by adding another digit to all area codes in Morocco.

=== 2006 - Merger of 04 into 02 and 05 into 03 ===
Six years later (2006-03-24 23:00 UTC), part of this split was reverted in order to make room for cellular networks. The 04 numbering area was merged into 02 and 05 was merged into 03, which caused 02 to cover the South while 03 covered the North. This could be done easily because there were no conflicts.

=== 2009 - Transition from 8-digit to 9-digit numbers ===
On 2009-03-07 at 02:00 UTC, phone numbers in Morocco got another additional digit. A 5 was prepended to all fixed numbers while a 6 was prepended to mobile numbers. The 08 numbers became 080 and 09 became 089.

Geographic Area	Before 2000-10-13	2000-10-13/2006-03-24	2006-03-24/2009-03-07	After 2009-03-07
Casablanca, Settat	0xxxxxxx	02xxxxxxx	02xxxxxxx	052xxxxxxx
Rabat, Tangier, Tetouan	0xxxxxxx	03xxxxxxx	03xxxxxxx	053xxxxxxx
Agadir, Marrakech	0xxxxxxx	04xxxxxxx	02xxxxxxx	052xxxxxxx
Fès, Meknès, Oujda	0xxxxxxx	05xxxxxxx	03xxxxxxx	053xxxxxxx
mobile networks	0xxxxxxx	06xxxxxxx	06xxxxxxx	066xxxxxxx
mobile networks		01xxxxxxx 07xxxxxxx	01xxxxxxx 07xxxxxxx	061xxxxxxx 067xxxxxxx
mobile networks			04xxxxxxx 05xxxxxxx	064xxxxxxx 065xxxxxxx
toll-free and shared cost services	08ab-cdef	08ab-0-cdef	08xxxxxxx	080xxxxxxx
premium rate services	92xxxx	09-292xxxx	09xxxxxxx	089xxxxxxx
