= Telephone numbers in Ascension Island =

Country Code: +247
International Call Prefix: 00

Ascension Island does not share the same country code (+290) with the rest of the St Helena territory.

Sure South Atlantic stopped providing telecommunications services on Ascension Island on 28 February 2026, following the expiry of its public telecommunications licence. Ascension Island Mobile (AIM), the new government owned operator, launched its mobile service in March 2026. The changeover caused a temporary disruption to international telephone and SMS services, with callers in some locations unable to reach Ascension Island numbers while international routing arrangements were reestablished. The international routes to numbers using the code were temporarily unavailable or unreliable during the transition.

== Calling formats ==
To call in Ascension Island, the following format is used:

247 yxxxx Calls inside Ascension Island
+247 247 yxxxx Calls from outside Ascension Island

== Ascension Island numbering plan ==
Numbering plan (effective from 1 April 2026)
Area	Format of subscriber number	Remarks
	247 4XXXX	Mobile services
	247 5XXXX	Non-geographic
US Base	247 62XXX	Geographic
Travellers Hill & Airhead	247 63XXX	Geographic
Two Boats	247 64XXX	Geographic
Georgetown	247 66XXX	Geographic
Georgetown	247 67XXX	Geographic

As from 1 March 2026, the length of all +247 numbers has increased to 11 digits (including the country code +247) to ensure compliance with international numbering formats. The digits ‘247’ have been inserted as a prefix at the beginning of the subscriber number for all numbers from the +247 national numbering plan (Geographic, Mobile and Non-geographic numbers). For example, a number that was previously +247 4XXXX is now +247 247 4XXXX.

According to ITU Communication of 08.V.2015, Sure South Atlantic Limited, Jamestown, announced the following update to the numbering plan for Ascension.

The length of geographical numbers increased from four (4) to five (5) digits and prefixed with the number "6".

The 4XXXX range is reserved for mobile services.

The change to five-digit numbering was to be implemented on 1 June 2015.

Numbering plan (before 1 June 2026)
Area	Format of Subscriber Number	Remarks
	1XXXXX ^{2}	Non-geographic
	4XXXX ^{1}	Mobile services
	50XXXX-59XXXX	Non-geographic
US Base	62XXX ^{1}	Geographic
Travellers Hill & Airhead	63XXX ^{1}	Geographic
Two Boats	64XXX ^{1}	Geographic
Georgetown	66XXX ^{1}	Geographic
Georgetown	67XXX ^{1}	Geographic
	8XXXXX ^{2}	Non–geographic
	9XXXXX ^{2}	Non–geographic
	0XXXXX ^{2}	Non–geographic

^{1}: New 5-digit numbering

^{2}: 6-digit numbering

Numbering plan (before 1 June 2015)
Area	Format of subscriber number	Remarks
Georgetown	10XX - 19XX	Operator Services
Georgetown	50XX - 59XX	Special Services
Georgetown	60XX - 69XX	Telephone Services
Georgetown	70XX - 79XX	Spare
Georgetown	80XX - 89XX	Special Services
Georgetown	90XX - 99XX	Special Services
Travellers Hill	30XX - 35XX	Telephone Services
Travellers Hill	36XX - 39XX	Spare
Two Boats	40XX - 43XX	Special Services
Two Boats	44XX - 46XX	Telephone Services
Two Boats	47XX - 49XX	Special Services
U.S. Base	20XX - 29XX	Telephone Services

== See also ==
- Telephone numbers in the United Kingdom
- Telephone numbers in Saint Helena and Tristan da Cunha

== Additional References ==
- Network Dictionary Dong, J. 2007. pp548–549. Saratoga : Javvin Press
