= Telephone numbers in France =

Telephone numbers in Metropolitan France
- 5 geographic zones
- Country: Metropolitan France
- Continent: Europe
- Regulator: ARCEP
- Numbering plan type: Closed
- NSN length: 9
- Format: 0x xx xx xx xx
- Country code: 33
- International access: 00
- Long-distance: 0

The French telephone numbering plan is used in Metropolitan France, French overseas departments and some overseas collectivities.

Since 1996, Metropolitan France uses a ten-digit closed numbering plan, where the first two digits denote a geographic area, mobile or non-geographic number.

- 01 Île-de-France
- 02 Northwest France
- 03 Northeast France
- 04 Southeast France
- 05 Southwest France
- 06 Mobile phone services
- 07 Mobile phone services
- 08 Special phone numbers: Freephone (numéro vert) and shared-cost services
- 09 Non-geographic number (used by voice over IP services)

All geographic numbers are dialed in the ten-digit format, even for local calls. The international access code is the International Telecommunication Union's recommended 00. When calling France from abroad, the leading zero should be omitted: for example, to call a number in Southwest France, one would dial +33 5 xx xx xx xx. Telephone numbers are usually stated as a sequence of five digit-pairs, e.g., 0x xx xx xx xx–and not, for example, 0 xxx-xxx-xxx or others.

Overseas departments and collectivities have distinct country codes and different digit grouping formats.

== Overseas departments and territories ==
The French overseas departments (départements d'outre mer or DOM) have separate country codes from metropolitan France, with Réunion being assigned the code 262 while Guadeloupe, French Guiana and Martinique were assigned the codes 590, 594 and 596 respectively. Until 1996, the use of the international access code 19 and country code was required for calls from metropolitan France. For example, to call Guadeloupe from metropolitan France, a subscriber would dial 19 590 xxx xxx, 590 being the country code. This included the islands of Saint Barthelemy and Saint Martin, which later separated from Guadeloupe to become collectivities, although they still use the same country code. By contrast, calls to metropolitan France from the overseas departments only required the use of the trunk code 16.

However, under the new present French numbering plan, direct dialing was introduced for calls between the DOMs (including collectivités territoriales) and metropolitan France, requiring only the '0' to be dialed, with the country code being used as a geographical area code. Despite this, the 33 country code was not adopted for calls to the DOMs from the rest of the world, because of technical difficulties with operators in neighbouring countries. For example, calls to Réunion from Mauritius would have to be routed via metropolitan France, adversely affecting voice quality as well as increasing call costs.

In 2001, telephone numbers in the DOMs changed to the same ten-digit format as metropolitan France, with new prefixes beginning with the digit '6' being adopted for mobile phone services:

=== Guadeloupe, Saint-Barthélemy and Saint-Martin ===
From France:

- Fixed phone line: 0 590 xx xx xx
- Mobile phone line: 0 690 xx xx xx or 0 691 xx xx xx

Outside France:

- Fixed phone line: +590 590 xx xx xx
- Mobile phone line: +590 690 xx xx xx or +590 691 xx xx xx

=== French Guiana ===
From France:

- Fixed phone line: 0 594 xx xx xx
- Mobile phone line: 0 694 xx xx xx

Outside France:

- Fixed phone line: +594 594 xx xx xx
- Mobile phone line: +594 694 xx xx xx

=== Martinique ===
From France:

- Fixed phone line: 0 596 xx xx xx
- Mobile phone line: 0 696 xx xx xx or 0 697 xx xx xx

Outside France:

- Fixed phone line: +596 596 xx xx xx
- Mobile phone line: +596 696 xx xx xx or +596 697 xx xx xx

=== Réunion ===
From France:

- Fixed phone line: 0 262 xx xx xx or 0 263 xx xx xx
- Mobile phone line: 0 692 xx xx xx or 0 693 xx xx xx

Outside France:

- Fixed phone line: +262 262 xx xx xx or +262 263 xx xx xx
- Mobile phone line: +262 692 xx xx xx or +262 693 xx xx xx

=== Others ===
Before 30 March 2007 the collectivité départementale of Mayotte used country code 269, shared with the Comoros:

- From France, including Mayotte: 0 269 xx xx xx
- From Comoros: xx xx xx
- Outside France and Comoros: +269 xx xx xx

On 30 March 2007 Mayotte adopted country code 262, used by Réunion, and a new numbering range was introduced for mobile phones:

- From France:
  - Fixed phone line: 0 269 xx xx xx
  - Mobile phone line: 0 639 xx xx xx
- Outside France:
  - Fixed phone line: +262 269 xx xx xx
  - Mobile phone line: +262 639 xx xx xx

Calls to Saint Pierre and Miquelon require only '0', telephone country code and the subscriber's six-digit number, e.g.:

- From France: 0 508 xx xx xx
- Outside France: +508 xx xx xx

Calls to and from the territoires d'outre mer, however, require full international dialing, hence the international access code and country code must be used:

- Paris from New Caledonia: 00 33 1 xx xx xx xx
- New Caledonia from Paris: 00 687 xx xx xx

== History ==
For many years, French subscribers' telephone numbers consisted of eight digits (including the one-digit area code 1 for all of Paris and its surrounding departments, or a two-digit area code from 20 to 99 for other metropolitan departments; this area code was dialed only after the trunk code 16). The territories of Overseas France all had their own local numbering plans and used their own country codes but no area codes, and calls between different territories or Metropolitan France required a dialing international call using the international call prefix 19 followed by the country code, area code, and subscriber number.

But that system began to run out of numbers in the 1980s, leading to the adoption of a new "eight-digit" numbering plan on 25 October 1985. On that date, France changed to a system of two zones, one for Paris and the surrounding Île-de-France and another for the other departments. Outside Paris, the old area code was incorporated into the subscriber's eight-digit number; for Paris, the area code 1 was retained, and a 4 was prefixed to seven-digit numbers, meaning that a subscriber's number could begin with 40, for example 4056 1873. For numbers in the Île-de-France surrounding Paris, the old codes 3x and 6x joined the old seven-digit numbers to become eight-digit numbers and were assigned to the Paris area code 1, with the trunk prefix 16 required for calls from the rest of France, followed by the area code 1 for Paris and the eight-digit number. To call the rest of France from Paris, however, the trunk prefix 16 had to be dialed before the eight-digit number.

On 18 October 1996, this changed to the present "ten-digit" system (including the default one-digit leading trunk code 0), in which each call is dialed using all ten digits, this national scheme being also extended to cover Overseas France in a single area. Area codes were abolished, and since then France has had a closed numbering plan, where all local or national calls require dialing the leading trunk code.

Following liberalisation in 1998, subscribers (first deployed on land lines and rapidly extended to all mobile networks) could access different carriers by replacing the leading trunk code 0 (omitted from numbers when called from outside France) with another carrier selection code (one digit from 2 to 9, or four digits 16xx). For example, Cegetel required subscribers to dial 7; e.g., Paris 71 xx xx xx xx, instead of 01 xx xx xx xx. Similarly, the international access code using Cegetel would be 70 instead of 00 by replacing the first 0. Since then, the carrier selection code still exists, but carrier preselection (and number portability) is offered by default on all subscriber lines, and the one-digit carrier selection is rarely used. In addition, several important national operators merged, and the four-digit carrier selection only persists for subscribers of various international service providers (most of them for mobile telephony, but these carrier selection prefixes are often dialed internally by a terminal device and callers don't need to care about it, unless they want to select carriers for different services). Additionally, call fees no longer depend on distance in the French numbering plan, so carrier selection is used only for international calls.

The 09 prefix was introduced for non-geographic numbers and special services in September 2006 and older numbers such as 08 7x xx xx xx (used for VoIP in Internet boxes) were replaced by 09 5x xx xx xx (telephone service offered by Internet service provider Free, later followed by other French ISPs).

The national information service reached by dialing "12" was closed in 2005, leading to the creation of numerous new information services reached by dialing 118 xxx. They cost €3 per call, plus €3 per minute.

=== Defunct prefixes ===
Changed in 1996:

- 16 - Long distance prefix - Changed to: 0
- 19 - International prefix - Changed to: 00

The second dial tone was also removed. Dialing procedures now reflect ETSI and ITU recommendations.

=== Andorra and Monaco ===
Until 17 December 1994, Andorra formed part of the French numbering plan, with calls from France requiring the prefix 628, (or 16 628 from Paris). Those from the rest of the world were made using +33 628, except from Spain, which were made using the prefix 9738. On that date, the principality adopted the telephone country code 376. Consequently, all calls from France to Andorra had to be dialled in international format, using the prefix 19 376. This was later changed to 00 376, along with the second French reform of 1996 to the newer "ten-digit" plan.

On 21 June 1996, Monaco similarly adopted its own telephone country code 377, replacing access from France (33 93).

== See also ==
- Local telephone area codes in France
