= Telephone numbers in Kenya =

- Country: Kenya
- Continent: Africa
- Regulator: Communications Authority of Kenya (CA)
- Numbering plan type: Closed
- NSN length: 9
- Country code: +254
- International access: 000
- Long-distance: 0

The following telephone numbers in Kenya are destination codes for international calls terminating in Kenya as well as the procedures for dialling internationally from within Kenya. Until 1999, Kenya shared its telephone numbering plan with Tanzania and Uganda, meaning that to make calls between the three countries, subscribers needed only dial the area code and number, a legacy of the East African Post and Telecommunications Corporation (EAPTC) which was dissolved in 1977. As a result of the reorganisation of Tanzania's numbering plan in that year, direct dialling was discontinued, although calls between the three countries do not require international dialling, only a special three-digit code.

== Landlines ==
Landline phone numbers in Kenya follow the format Area Code + Phone Number. To dial a number within an area or city, only the phone number needs to be dialled. When dialling from a different area or city, the telephone number is dialled in the format 0 + Area Code + Phone Number. When dialling from abroad, the 0 is omitted.

== List of area codes in Kenya ==
List of area codes
Area	Area code	Area	Area code
Mandera	20	Mombasa	41
Kwale	40	Malindi	42
Voi	43	Machakos	44
Kajiado	45	Garissa	46
Naivasha	50	Nakuru	51
Kericho	52	Eldoret	53
Kitale	54	Bungoma	55
Kakamega	56	Kisumu	57
Kisii	58	Homa Bay	59
Murang'a	60	Nyeri	61
Nanyuki	62	Meru	64
Nyahururu	65	Karuri	66
Thika	67	Embu	68
Marsabit	69	Wajir	46

== Mobile operators ==
In Kenya there are four mobile network operators (MNO): Safaricom, Airtel (formerly Kencell, Celtel, and Zain), Equitel (MVNO) and Telkom Kenya (Orange). The Communications Authority of Kenya (CAK) has assigned several Area Codes to each operator. All mobile Area Codes used to start with the digit 7. As of May 2019, the Communications authority introduced codes starting with the digit 1. Please note: Since April 2011 Mobile number portability (MNP) is implemented in Kenya. The phone number can be ported by the customer to another operator.

Prefix	Example	Operator
10	+254,10x xxxxxx	Airtel
11	+254,11x xxxxxx	Safaricom
14	+254,14x xxxxxx	Safaricom
18	+254,18x xxxxxx	Safaricom
701	+254,701 xxxxxx	Safaricom
702	+254,702 xxxxxx	Safaricom
703	+254,703 xxxxxx	Safaricom
704	+254,704 xxxxxx	Safaricom
705	+254,705 xxxxxx	Safaricom
706	+254,706 xxxxxx	Safaricom
707	+254,707 xxxxxx	Safaricom
708	+254,708 xxxxxx	Safaricom
709	+254,709 xxxxxx	Safaricom
710	+254,710 xxxxxx	Safaricom
711	+254,711 xxxxxx	Safaricom
712	+254,712 xxxxxx	Safaricom
713	+254,713 xxxxxx	Safaricom
714	+254,714 xxxxxx	Safaricom
715	+254,715 xxxxxx	Safaricom
716	+254,716 xxxxxx	Safaricom
717	+254,717 xxxxxx	Safaricom
718	+254,718 xxxxxx	Safaricom
719	+254,719 xxxxxx	Safaricom
720	+254,720 xxxxxx	Safaricom
721	+254,721 xxxxxx	Safaricom
722	+254,722 xxxxxx	Safaricom
723	+254,723 xxxxxx	Safaricom
724	+254,724 xxxxxx	Safaricom
725	+254,725 xxxxxx	Safaricom
726	+254,726 xxxxxx	Safaricom
727	+254,727 xxxxxx	Safaricom
728	+254,728 xxxxxx	Safaricom
729	+254,729 xxxxxx	Safaricom
730	+254,730 xxxxxx	Airtel
731	+254,731 xxxxxx	Airtel
732	+254,732 xxxxxx	Airtel
733	+254,733 xxxxxx	Airtel
734	+254,734 xxxxxx	Airtel
735	+254,735 xxxxxx	Airtel
736	+254,736 xxxxxx	Airtel
737	+254,737 xxxxxx	Airtel
738	+254,738 xxxxxx	Airtel
739	+254,739 xxxxxx	Airtel
740	+254,740 xxxxxx	Safaricom
741	+254,741 xxxxxx	Safaricom
742	+254,742 xxxxxx	Safaricom
743	+254,743 xxxxxx	Safaricom
744	+254,744 xxxxxx	Homelands Media
745	+254,745 xxxxxx	Safaricom
746	+254,746 xxxxxx	Safaricom
747	+254,747 xxxxxx	Faiba 4G
748	+254,748 xxxxxx	Safaricom
750	+254,750 xxxxxx	Airtel
751	+254,751 xxxxxx	Airtel
752	+254,752 xxxxxx	Airtel
753	+254,753 xxxxxx	Airtel
754	+254,754 xxxxxx	Airtel
755	+254,755 xxxxxx	Airtel
756	+254,756 xxxxxx	Airtel
757	+254,757 xxxxxx	Safaricom
758	+254,758 xxxxxx	Safaricom
759	+254,759 xxxxxx	Safaricom
760	+254,760 xxxxxx	Mobile Pay
761	+254,761 xxxxxx	Eferio
762	+254,762 xxxxxx	Airtel
763	+254,763 xxxxxx	Equitel
764	+254,764 xxxxxx	Equitel
765	+254,765 xxxxxx	Equitel
766	+254,766 xxxxxx	Equitel
767	+254,767 xxxxxx	Sema Mobile
768	+254,768 xxxxxx	Safaricom
769	+254,769 xxxxxx	Safaricom
770	+254,770 xxxxxx	Telkom Kenya
771	+254,771 xxxxxx	Telkom Kenya
772	+254,772 xxxxxx	Telkom Kenya
773	+254,773 xxxxxx	Telkom Kenya
774	+254,774 xxxxxx	Telkom Kenya
775	+254,775 xxxxxx	Telkom Kenya
776	+254,776 xxxxxx	Telkom Kenya
777	+254,777 xxxxxx	Telkom Kenya
778	+254,778 xxxxxx	Telkom Kenya
779	+254,779 xxxxxx	Telkom Kenya
780	+254,780 xxxxxx	Airtel
781	+254,781 xxxxxx	Airtel
782	+254,782 xxxxxx	Airtel
783	+254,783 xxxxxx	Airtel
784	+254,784 xxxxxx	Airtel
785	+254,785 xxxxxx	Airtel
786	+254,786 xxxxxx	Airtel
787	+254,787 xxxxxx	Airtel
788	+254,788 xxxxxx	Airtel
789	+254,789 xxxxxx	Airtel
790	+254,790 xxxxxx	Safaricom
791	+254,791 xxxxxx	Safaricom
792	+254,792 xxxxxx	Safaricom
793	+254,793 xxxxxx	Safaricom
794	+254,794 xxxxxx	Safaricom
795	+254,795 xxxxxx	Safaricom
796	+254,796 xxxxxx	Safaricom
797	+254,797 xxxxxx	Safaricom
798	+254,798 xxxxxx	Safaricom
799	+254,799 xxxxxx	Safaricom

== Non-geographic numbers ==
Calls to numbers starting 0800 are free.

== Calls to and from Tanzania and Uganda ==
To call Kenya from Tanzania and Uganda, subscribers must dial 005, followed by the area code and number. To call Uganda from Kenya, subscribers must dial 006, followed by the area code and number, while calls to Tanzania require the prefix 007.

== International dialling ==
To call Kenya from other countries, subscribers must dial their international access code e.g. 00 for most European countries, and 011 from North America, followed by the country code 254. The international access code for calls from Kenya is 000.
