= Tristan da Cunha =

Group of islands in the South Atlantic

- Constituent part of Saint Helena, Ascension and Tristan da Cunha
- Flag Coat of arms
- Motto: "Our faith is our strength"
- Anthem: "God Save the King" (Note: "God Save the King" is the national anthem by custom, not statute, and there is no authorised version. Typically only the first verse is usually sung, although the second verse is also often sung as well at state and public events. The words King, he, him, his, used at present, are replaced by Queen, she, her when the monarch is female.)
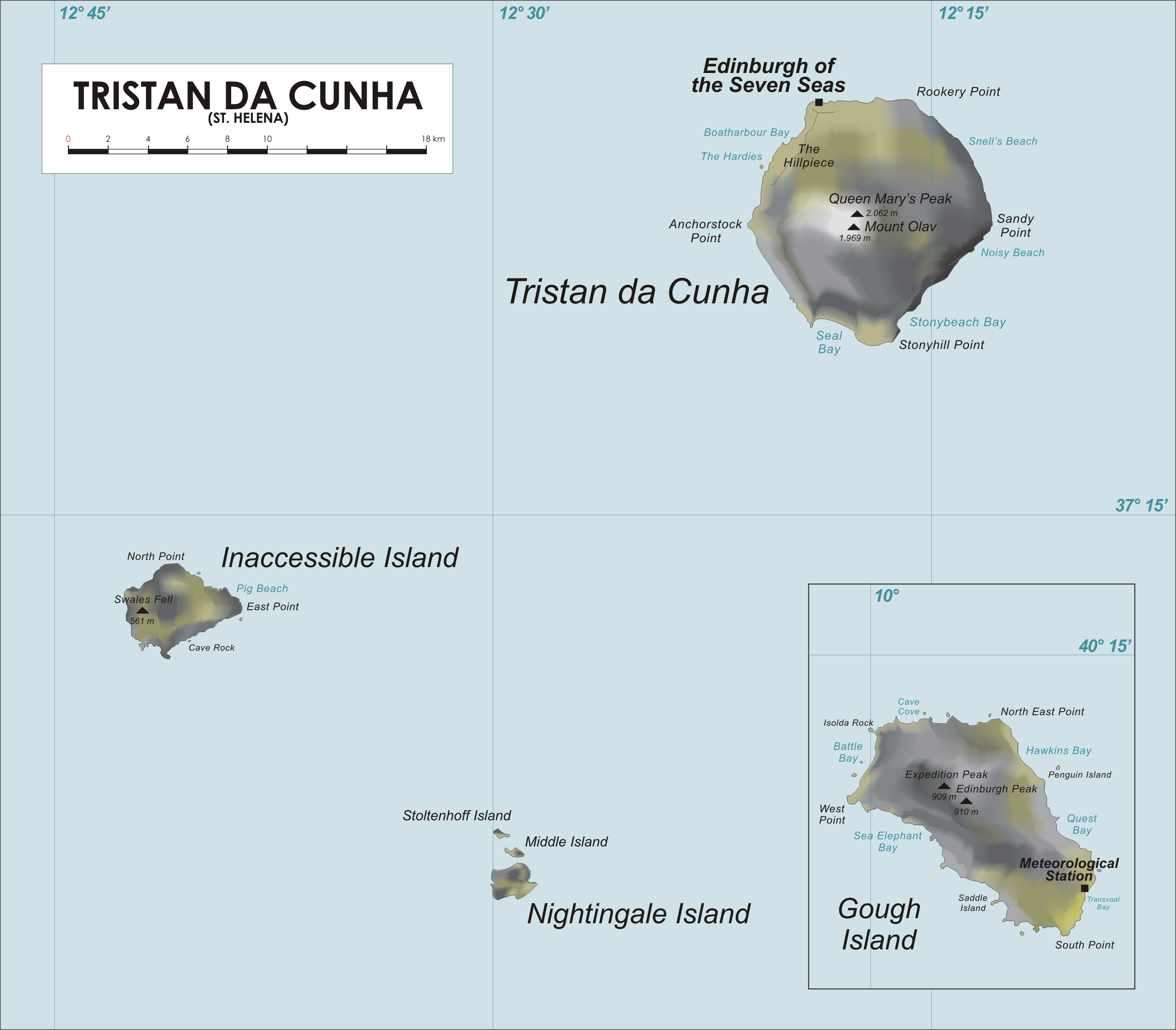
- Map of Tristan da Cunha

- Location of the Tristan da Cunha archipelago (circled in red) in the southern Atlantic Ocean
- Sovereignty: United Kingdom
- Overseas territory: Saint Helena, Ascension and Tristan da Cunha
- First settlement: 1810; 216 years ago
- Dependency of Cape Colony: 14 August 1816; 210 years ago
- Dependency of Saint Helena: 12 January 1938; 88 years ago
- Current constitution: 1 September 2009; 17 years ago
- Named after: Tristão da Cunha
- Capital and largest settlement: Edinburgh of the Seven Seas; 37°4′3″S 12°18′40″W
- Official languages: English
- Ethnic groups: Tristanians (mostly of British and Italian descent)
- Demonym(s): Tristanian
- Government: Self-governing dependency under a constitutional monarchy
  - Monarch: Charles III
  - Governor: Nigel Phillips
  - Administrator: Philip Kendall
  - Chief Islander: Ian Lavarello
- Legislature: Island Council

Government of the United Kingdom
  - Minister: Uma Kumaran

Area
  - Total: 207 km^{2} (80 sq mi)
  - Main island: 98 km^{2} (38 sq mi)
- Highest elevation: 2,062 m (6,765 ft)

Population
  - 2026 census: 221
  - Density: 1.3/km^{2} (3.4/sq mi) (5th least dense)
- Currency: Pound sterling (£) (GBP)
- Time zone: UTC±00:00 (GMT)
- Date format: dd/mm/yyyy
- Driving side: Left
- Calling code: +44 20 (assigned +290)
- UK postcode: TDCU 1ZZ
- ISO 3166 code: SH-TA
- Internet TLD: .sh; .uk

Tristan da Cunha (/ˌtrɪstən də ˈkuːn(j)ə/), colloquially known as Tristan, is a remote group of volcanic islands in the South Atlantic Ocean. It is one of three constituent parts of the British Overseas Territory of Saint Helena, Ascension and Tristan da Cunha, with its own constitution.

The territory consists of the inhabited island Tristan da Cunha, which has a diameter of roughly 11 kilometres (6.8 mi) and an area of 98 square kilometres (38 sq mi); the wildlife reserves of Gough Island and Inaccessible Island; and the smaller, uninhabited Nightingale Islands. As of September 2026, the main island had 222 permanent inhabitants, all of whom hold British Overseas Territories citizenship. The other islands are uninhabited, except for the South African personnel at a weather station on Gough Island.

The island has no airstrip; the only way to travel to or from Tristan is by ship. It is a six-day journey from Cape Town, South Africa, and some cruises depart from Ushuaia, Argentina. The island of Tristan da Cunha is considered to be the most remote inhabited place in the world.

== History ==
=== Discovery ===
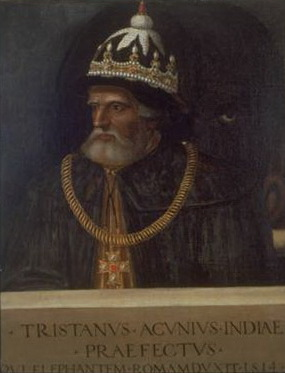
Portuguese explorer Tristão da Cunha is both the namesake of Tristan da Cunha and the first person to sight the island in 1506.

The islands were first recorded as sighted in 1506 by Portuguese explorer Tristão da Cunha, though rough seas prevented a landing. He believed them to be uninhabited and named the main island after himself, Ilha de Tristão da Cunha. It was later anglicised from its earliest mention on British Admiralty charts to Tristan da Cunha Island. Some sources state that the Portuguese made the first landing in 1520, when Lás Rafael, captained by Ruy Vaz Pereira, called at Tristan for water.

The first undisputed landing was made on 7 February 1643 by the crew of the Dutch East India Company ship Heemstede, captained by Claes Gerritsz Bierenbroodspot. The Dutch stopped at the island four more times in the next 25 years, and in 1656 created the first rough charts of the archipelago.

The first full survey of the archipelago was made by the crew of the French corvette L'Heure du Berger (The Shepherd's Hour) in 1767. Measurements were taken and a rough sounding of the coast was carried out. The presence of water at the great waterfall of Big Watron and in a lake on the north coast was noted, with the survey results later published by a Royal Navy hydrographer in 1781.

On his voyage out from Europe to East Africa and India in command of the Imperial Asiatic Company of Trieste and Antwerp ship, Joseph and Theresa, William Bolts sighted Tristan da Cunha, put a landing party ashore on 2 February 1777 and hoisted the flag of the Holy Roman Empire, naming it and its neighbouring islets the Brabant Islands. However, no settlement or facilities were ever set up there by the company.

After the outbreak of the American Revolutionary War halted penal transportation to the Thirteen Colonies, British prisons became overcrowded. As several stopgap measures proved ineffective, the British Government announced in December 1785 that it would proceed with the settlement of New South Wales. In September 1786 Alexander Dalrymple, presumably goaded by Bolts's actions, published a pamphlet with an alternative proposal of his own for settlements on Tristan da Cunha, St. Paul and Amsterdam islands in the Southern Ocean.

Royal Navy Captain John Blankett also suggested independently to his superiors in August 1786 that convicts be used to establish a British settlement on Tristan. (Note: Blankett, John (6 August 1786). "[settlement on Tristan da Cunha]". Letter to Howe. Greenwich: National Maritime Museum. HOW 3. cited in Frost (1980)) In consequence, the Admiralty received orders from the government in October 1789 to examine the island as part of a general survey of the South Atlantic and the coasts of southern Africa. (Note: Grenville (3 October 1789). "[general survey of the South Atlantic]". Letter to Admiralty Lords. Public Record Office. ADM 1/4154: 43. cited in Frost (1980)) That did not happen, but an investigation of Tristan, Amsterdam and St. Paul was undertaken in December 1792 and January 1793 by George Macartney, Britain's first ambassador to China. During his voyage to China, he established that none of the islands were suitable for settlement.

Later in the same month, the first scientific exploration on the island was conducted by French botanist Louis-Marie Aubert du Petit-Thouars, who stayed on the island for three days during a French mercantile expedition from Brest, France, to Isle de France (Mauritius). Thouars made botanical collections and reported traces of human habitation, including fireplaces and overgrown gardens, probably left by Dutch explorers in the 17th century.

=== 19th century ===
The first permanent settler was Jonathan Lambert of Salem, Massachusetts, United States, who arrived in December 1810 with two other men, later joined by a fourth. Lambert declared the islands his property and named them the Islands of Refreshment. Three of the four men died in 1812, leaving Thomas Currie (Tommaso Corri, from Livorno, Italy) as the sole survivor, who remained as a farmer on the island.

On 14 August 1816, the United Kingdom annexed the islands by dispatching a garrison to secure possession, making them a dependency of the Cape Colony in South Africa. This was intended to prevent the islands' use as a base for any attempt to free Napoleon Bonaparte from his imprisonment on Saint Helena. The occupation also deterred the United States from using Tristan da Cunha as a base for naval cruisers, as it had during the War of 1812. The garrison departed in November 1817, though some members, notably William Glass, stayed and formed the nucleus of a permanent population.

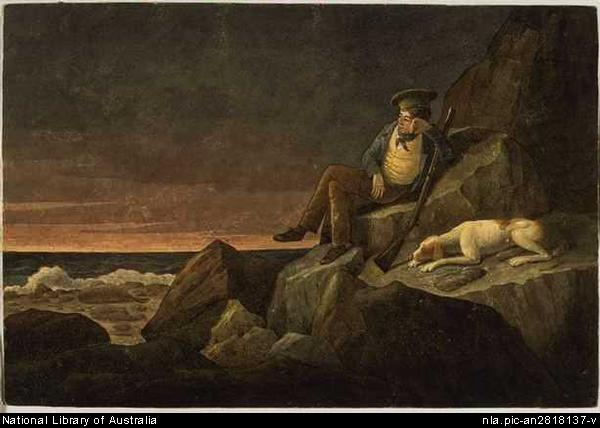
Augustus Earle, (Self Portrait) Solitude, watching the horizon at sun set, in the hopes of seeing a vessel, Tristan de Acunha (i.e. da Cunha), (1824), watercolour; 17.5 cm × 25.7 cm (6.9 in × 10.1 in). National Library of Australia

"On the fifteenth of July, the snow-clad mountains of Tristan da Cunha appeared, lighted by a brilliant morning-sun, and towering to a height estimated at between nine and ten thousand feet."

— Edmund Roberts, Embassy to the Eastern Courts of Cochin-China, Siam, and Muscat (1837)

By 1824, a small civilian community had developed alongside the British Marines' garrison. When Berwick stopped there on 25 March 1824, it reported twenty-two men and three women, including the artist Augustus Earle, stranded on the island for eight months when his ship, the ageing Duke of Gloucester, anchored there due to a storm and sailed without him and a crew member. Earle tutored local children and painted until his supplies ran out, before being rescued in November by Admiral Cockburn en route to Hobart. The barque South Australia visited between 18 and 20 February 1836, when a Mr. Glass was described as the settlement's governor. That same year, the schooner Emily was wrecked there; one survivor, Dutch fisherman Pieter Groen from Katwijk, remained, married, and changed his name to Peter Green. He later became the spokesman (governor) of the community in 1865. By 1856, the population had grown to 97 residents.

A resident parson arrived in February 1851, and Tristan was formally included in the Anglican Diocese of Cape Town when its bishop, Robert Gray, visited in March 1856. In 1869, it was transferred to the new Diocese of St Helena. In 1867, Prince Alfred, Duke of Edinburgh, second son of Queen Victoria, visited the islands. The only settlement was renamed Edinburgh of the Seven Seas in his honour. (Note: The visit took place during the Duke of Edinburgh's circumnavigation while commanding HMS Galatea. Tristan da Cunha issued four stamps in 1967 to mark the centenary of the visit.) On 15 October 1873, the Royal Navy survey vessel HMS Challenger called at Tristan to conduct geographic and zoological surveys on the island group. Captain George Nares recorded fifteen families and eighty-six inhabitants at that time.

In 1875, Henry Herbert, 4th Earl of Carnarvon, as Secretary of State for the Colonies decided against annexing Tristan to the Cape Colony, or making it a colony in its own right, or giving magistrate powers to any resident. Instead, an order in council was drafted under the British Settlements Act 1843 (6 & 7 Vict. c. 13) to give magistrate powers to the officer commanding any Royal Navy vessel while touching at Tristan, with jurisdiction in graver cases reserved to the Cape Colony courts under the West Coast of Africa and Falkland Islands Act 1860 (23 & 24 Vict. c. 121). The Law Officers of the Crown reviewed the draft order and decided that it was valid on the basis that Tristan was part of the British Empire. The government gave £200 to provide "useful presents" for the islanders, including a flag.

Whalers established bases on the islands during the mid-19th century, but the opening of the Suez Canal in 1869 and the transition from sail to coal-fired steamships increased Tristan's isolation. The islands were no longer needed as a stopover point for long sailing voyages or as a haven on routes from Europe to East Asia.

Victims of the 1885 Lifeboat Disaster:

- Joe Beetham
- Thomas & Cornelius Cotton
- Thomas Glass
- John, William & Alfred Green
- Jacob, William & Jeremiah Green
- Albert, James & William Hagan
- Samuel & Thomas Swain

On 27 November 1885, the island suffered one of its worst tragedies when the iron barque West Riding, en route from Bristol to Sydney, approached the island. Because trading opportunities were rare, almost all able-bodied men launched a lifeboat to trade with the ship despite rough seas. The lifeboat, recently donated by the British government, was last seen sailing alongside the West Riding before disappearing. Reports varied—some claimed the men drowned, while others speculated they were taken to Australia and sold as slaves. Fifteen men were lost, leaving behind an island of widows. A plaque in St Mary's Church commemorates the tragedy.

In 1892 the Italian brig Italia, having caught fire with a cargo of coal, beached on the eastern shore of Tristan da Cunha. Two of her crew, Andrea Repetto and Gaetano Lavarello of the Ligurian town of Camogli, stayed on the island to settle and found families.

=== 20th century ===
==== Hard winter of 1906 ====
After years of hardship since the 1880s and an especially difficult winter in 1906, the British government offered to evacuate the island in 1907. The Tristanians held a meeting and decided to refuse, despite the government's warning that it could not promise further help in the future.

==== Resilience ====
In the early 20th century, particularly around 1906–1908, the Tristan da Cunha community survived extreme isolation by relying on self-sufficiency. Italian shipwreck survivor Gaetano Lavarello provided essential carpentry skills for building longboats, which made it possible for the community to travel to neighbouring Inaccessible Island and access vital resources such as albatrosses, shearwaters, and penguins for food. In 1906, unusually dry weather led to poor potato crops, and an estimated 400 head of cattle were lost, but the community did not starve. Rev. and Mrs Barrow provided ministry, landing at "Down-Where-The-Minister-Landed-His-Things," where they brought a harmonium. In 1908, the return of two Glass brothers and their marriage to Irish sisters Elizabeth and Agnes Smith brought significant influence to teaching and the Roman Catholic faith on the island.

==== Occasional pre-war visits ====
No ships called at the islands from 1909 until 1919, when HMS Yarmouth stopped to inform the islanders of the outcome of World War I.

The Shackleton–Rowett Expedition stopped in Tristan for five days in May 1922, collecting geological and botanical samples before returning to Cape Town. Among the few ships that visited in the coming years were RMS Asturias, a Royal Mail Steam Packet Company passenger liner, in 1927, and the Canadian Pacific ocean liners RMS Empress of France in 1928, RMS Duchess of Atholl in 1929, and RMS Empress of Australia in 1935.

In 1936, The Daily Telegraph of London reported that the population of the island was 167 people, with 185 cattle and 42 horses.

From December 1937 to March 1938, a Norwegian party made a dedicated scientific expedition to Tristan da Cunha, and sociologist Peter A. Munch extensively documented island culture; he visited the island again in 1964–1965. The island was also visited in 1938 by W. Robert Foran, reporting for the National Geographic Society. His account was published that same year.

On 12 January 1938 by letters patent, Britain declared the islands a dependency of Saint Helena, creating the British Crown Colony of Saint Helena and Dependencies, which also included Ascension Island.

==== World War II military development ====
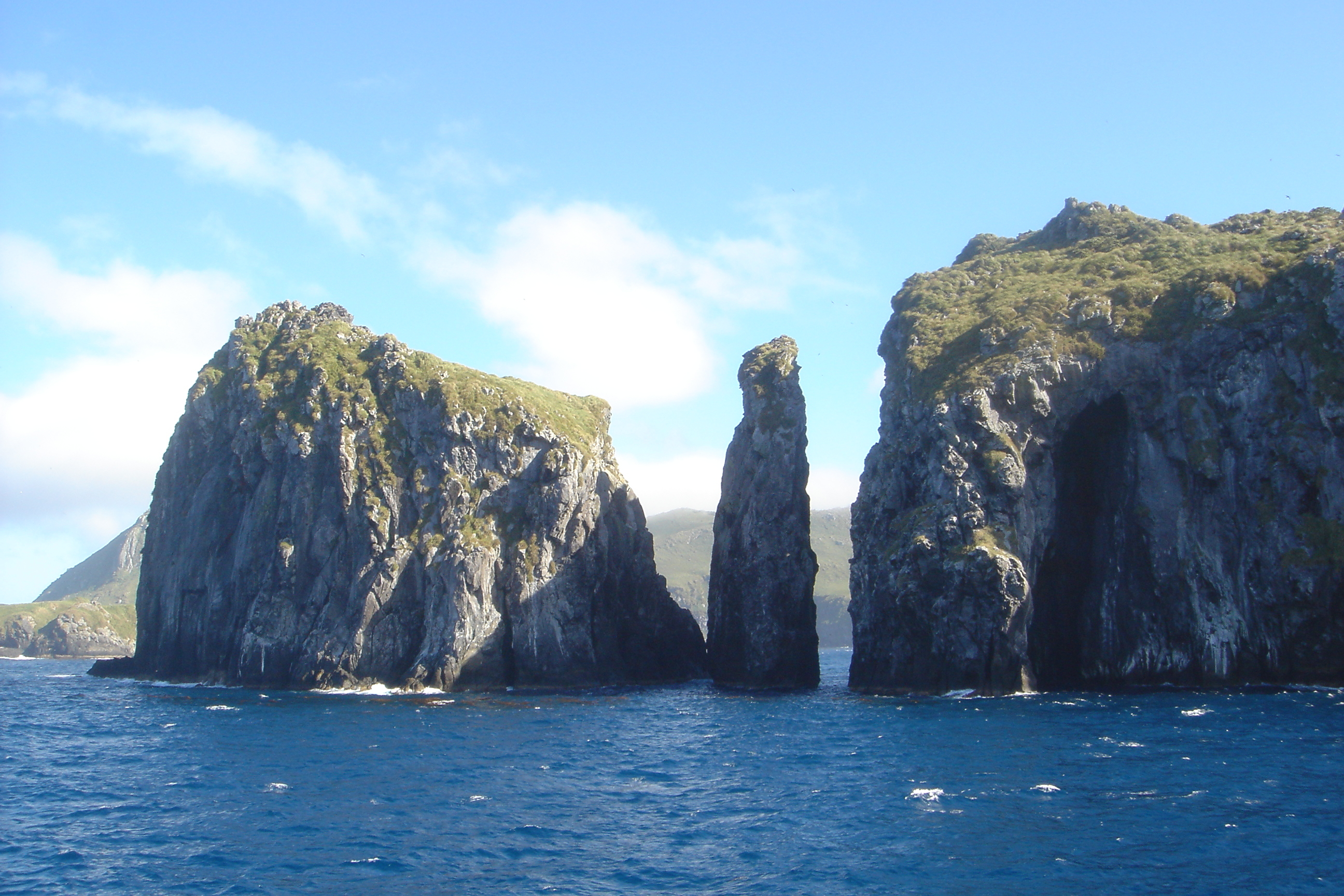
Gough and Inaccessible Islands are a UNESCO World Heritage Site.

During the Second World War, Tristan was commissioned by the Royal Navy as the so-called "stone frigate" HMS Atlantic Isle and used as a secret signals intelligence station, to monitor German U-boats (which were required to maintain radio contact) and shipping in the South Atlantic Ocean. The weather and radio stations led to extensive new infrastructure being built on the island, including a school, a hospital, and a cash-based general store.

The first colonial official sent to rule the island was Sir Hugh Elliott in the rank of administrator (because the settlement was too small to merit a governor) 1950 to 1953. Development continued as the island's first canning factory expanded paid employment in 1949.

==== Rare post-war ship visits ====
On 2 January 1954, Tristan da Cunha was visited by the Dutch ship Willem Ruys, a passenger-cargo liner, carrying science fiction writer Robert A. Heinlein, his wife Ginny and other passengers. The Ruys was travelling from Rio de Janeiro, Brazil, to Cape Town, South Africa. The visit is described in Heinlein's book Tramp Royale. The captain told Heinlein the island was the most isolated inhabited spot on Earth and ships rarely visited. Heinlein mailed a letter from there to L. Ron Hubbard, a friend who also liked to travel, "for the curiosity value of the postmark". Biographer William H. Patterson Jr., in his two-volume Robert A. Heinlein in Dialogue with his Century, wrote that lack of "cultural context" made it "nearly impossible to converse" with the islanders, "a stark contrast with the way they had managed to chat with strangers" while travelling in South America. Members of the crew bought penguins during their brief visit to the island.

Prince Philip, Duke of Edinburgh, Queen Elizabeth II's consort, visited the islands in 1957 as part of a world tour on board the royal yacht HMY Britannia.

==== 1961 eruption of Queen Mary's Peak ====
On 10 October 1961, the eruption of a parasitic cone of Queen Mary's Peak, very close to Edinburgh of the Seven Seas, forced the evacuation of all 264 people. The evacuees took to the water in open boats, taken by the local lobster-fishing boats Tristania and Frances Repetto to uninhabited Nightingale Island.

The next day, they were picked up by the diverted Dutch passenger ship Tjisadane that took them to Cape Town. The islanders later arrived in the UK aboard the liner M.V. Stirling Castle to a big press reception and, after a short period at Pendell Army Camp in Merstham, Surrey, were settled in an old Royal Air Force camp near Calshot, Hampshire.

The following year, a Royal Society expedition reported that Edinburgh of the Seven Seas had survived. Most families returned in 1963.

==== Gough and Inaccessible Islands wildlife reserves ====
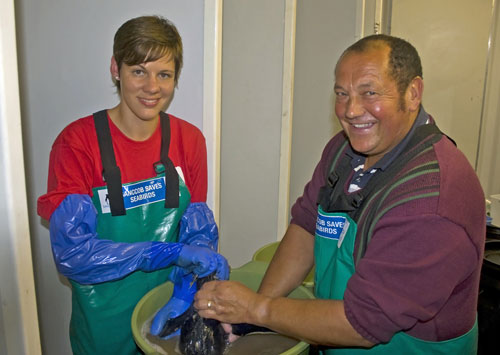
Cleaning oil off penguins after the spillage from MS Oliva, Tristan da Cunha

Gough Island was inscribed as a UNESCO World Heritage Site in 1995 as Gough Island Wildlife Reserve. This was further extended in 2004 as Gough and Inaccessible Islands, with its marine zone extended from 3 to 12 nautical miles.

These islands have been Ramsar sites – wetlands of international importance – since 20 November 2008.

=== 21st century ===
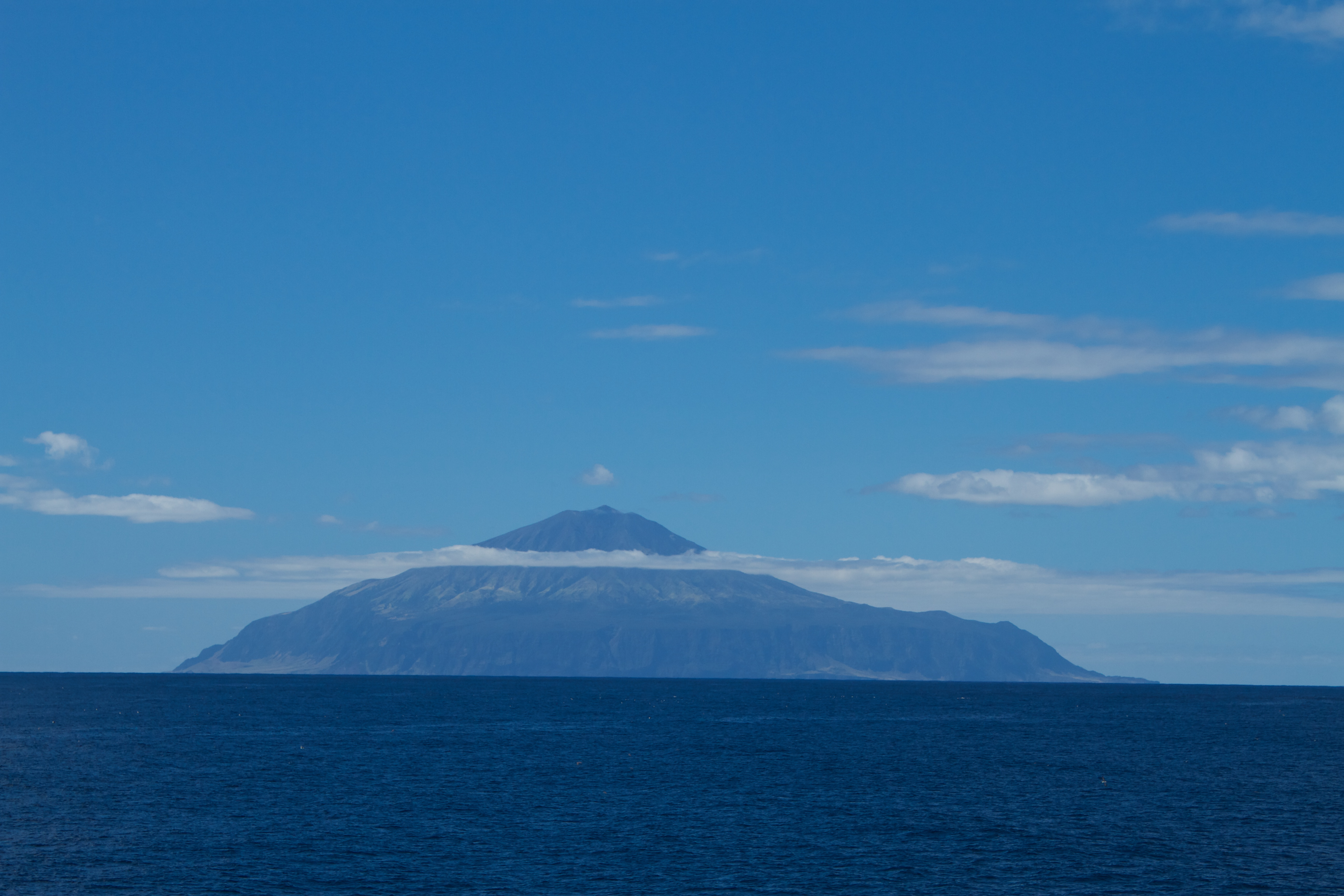
Tristan da Cunha in 2012

On 21 May 2001, the islands were hit by an extratropical cyclone that generated winds up to 190 kilometres per hour (120 mph). Several structures were severely damaged, and numerous cattle were killed, prompting emergency aid provided by the British government.

In 2005 the islands were given a United Kingdom post code (TDCU 1ZZ), to make it easier for the residents to order goods online.

On 13 February 2008, a fire destroyed the island's four power generators and fish canning factory, severely disrupting the economy. On 14 March 2008, new generators were installed and power restored, and a new factory opened in July 2009. While the replacement factory was being built, MV Kelso came to the island as a factory ship. The St. Helena, Ascension, and Tristan da Cunha Constitution Order 2009 reorganised Tristan da Cunha as a constituent of the new British Overseas Territory of Saint Helena, Ascension and Tristan da Cunha, giving Tristan and Ascension equal status with Saint Helena.

On 16 March 2011, the freighter MS Oliva ran aground on Nightingale Island, spilling tons of heavy fuel oil into the ocean. The resulting oil slick threatened the island's population of rockhopper penguins. Nightingale Island has no fresh water, so the penguins were transported to Tristan da Cunha for cleaning.

==== COVID-19 ====
Tristan da Cunha recorded no community cases of COVID-19. On 16 March 2020, the local Island Council enacted a total ban on all outside visitors. Because the island has no airport and relies on a six-day boat journey from South Africa, managing entry points was simple. While the rest of the world locked down, daily life in the lone settlement of Edinburgh of the Seven Seas continued as usual, without masks, social distancing, or closures. The island's isolation posed a unique challenge for vaccine delivery. In April 2021, the UK Royal Navy vessel HMS Forth completed a complex multi-leg military relay from Oxfordshire via the Falkland Islands. It successfully delivered enough Oxford-AstraZeneca doses to fully vaccinate the entire adult population within days of arrival. The territory's strict defences faced only one major test. In July 2021, two crew members tested positive aboard the visiting offshore fishing vessel MFV Edinburgh. The local government immediately turned the ship back to Cape Town and placed the island into a strict 10-day precautionary lockdown. The virus never breached the shore. On 2 March 2023, following a comprehensive booster campaign, the Island Council officially lifted all remaining travel restrictions and vaccine requirements. Today, the territory remains entirely COVID-free, standing as a unique historical example of a perfect geographic quarantine.

==== Marine Protection Zone ====
On 13 November 2020, it was announced that the 687,247 square kilometres (265,348 sq mi) of the waters surrounding the islands will become a Marine Protection Zone. The move will make the zone the largest no-take zone in the Atlantic and the fourth largest on the planet. The move follows 20 years of conservation work by the RSPB and the island government, and 5 years of support from the UK government's Blue Belt Programme.

==== Hantavirus ====
In April–May 2026, the island was affected by the MV Hondius hantavirus outbreak after a resident disembarked from the ship during its 13–15 April 2026 stop, while four other island residents boarded. The disembarked passenger (former police chief Conrad Glass) subsequently became ill, quickly consumed most of the oxygen supply at the island's small hospital, and exhausted its limited staff.

On 9 May 2026, a specialist UK military team executed a historic emergency mission, parachuting onto Tristan da Cunha with medical assistance for the suspected hantavirus case. The team comprised six paratroopers from the British Army Pathfinder Platoon of the 16 Air Assault Brigade, one specialist doctor and one military intensive care nurse. Due to the critical care required, specialist doctor Officer Toby Kington and an intensive care nurse were strapped to paratroopers for tandem jumps. The nurse had done a civilian tandem jump before, but it was Kington's first. An RAF A400M transport aircraft flew the team 6,788 km (4,218 mi) from RAF Brize Norton to Ascension Island, before flying another 3,000 km (1,900 mi) south, sustained by mid-air refuelling from an RAF Voyager tanker. Arriving at the drop zone 5 km (3.1 mi) northeast of the island, the team jumped from about 2,100 m (6,900 ft) so that strong winds would blow them over land. A local police RIB patrolled below as a safety precaution. The operation was completed in two phases. The first group of four paratroopers landed near the "Back Fence" and set up radio guidance at "The Patches". The second group, two paratroopers and the two clinicians, landed safely via tandem parachutes onto the island's 9-hole golf course. Once the personnel were on the ground, the A400M air-dropped 3.3 tonnes (3.2 long tons; 3.6 short tons) of vital medical cargo and oxygen cylinders across three subsequent runs, successfully stabilising the island's healthcare emergency before returning to Ascension.

The four Tristanian residents who had embarked on the same vessel—Paul Repetto, Geraldine Repetto, their daughter Katie, and Linda Green—were placed in a 45-day preventive quarantine at its next stop, Saint Helena. The Repettos are descendants of one of the Italian sailors who settled on Tristan da Cunha after the shipwreck of the Italia in 1892.

HMS Medway was dispatched from her post in the Falkland Islands on 14 May 2026. She sailed for seven days through notoriously rough waters to reach Tristan da Cunha. HMS Medway arrived off the coast at Calshot Harbour on 22 May. Her primary objectives were to deliver six fresh civilian clinicians and heavy medical provisions to ensure long-term healthcare resilience on the island and extract the paratroopers and military medics to the Falklands who had been stationed on the island for two weeks. Four of the arriving medics were from the UK and two from the Falkland Islands. On 24 May, sea conditions allowed them to get the civilian medics and one crew member off first, and then the military medics and paratroopers boarded the ship using a Tristan Fisheries RIB, although some of the paratroopers' kit remained on the island to be shipped at a later date. HMS Medway then set sail for the Falklands.

==== Solar eclipse ====
A total solar eclipse will pass over the island on 5 December 2048. The island is calculated to be on the centre line of the umbra's path for nearly three and a half minutes of totality.

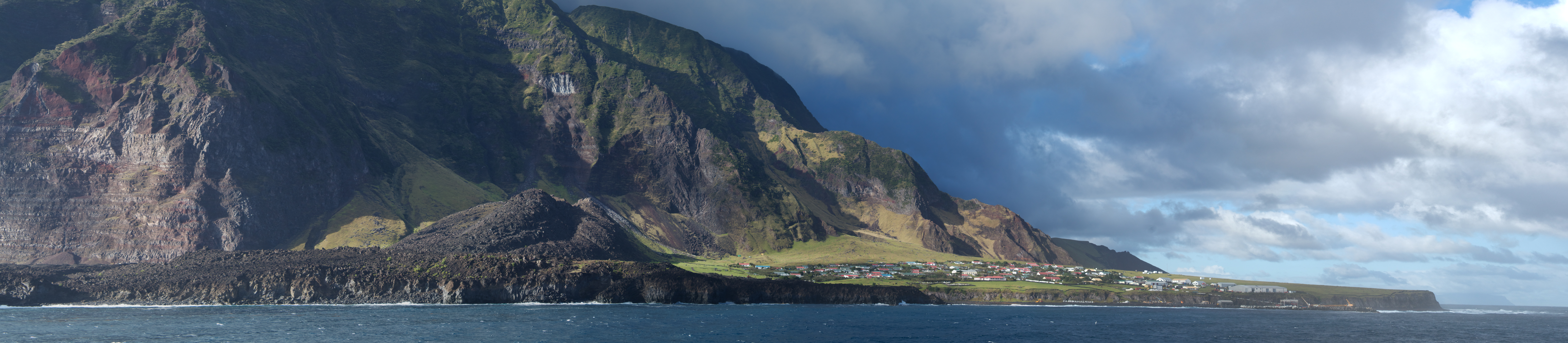
Edinburgh of the Seven Seas, the only settlement on the island. The parasitic cone from the 1961 eruption can be seen in the foreground, centre left.

== Geography ==
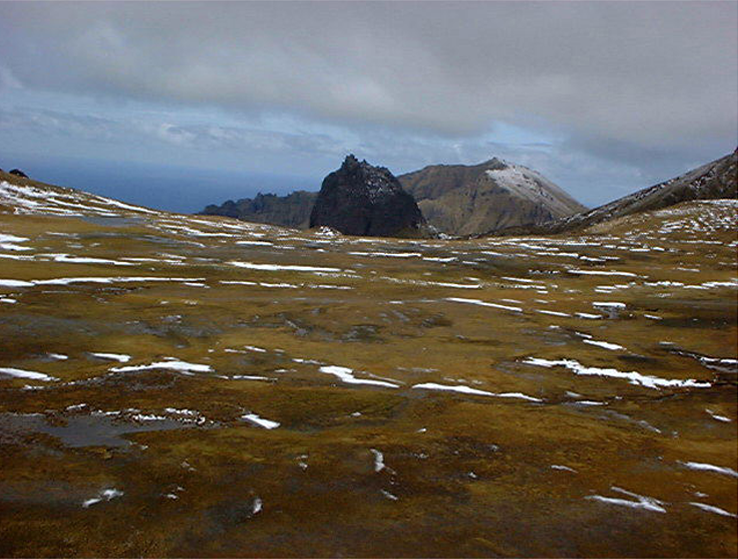
Gough Island, Tristan da Cunha

Tristan da Cunha is thought to have been formed by a long-lived centre of upwelling mantle called the Tristan hotspot. Tristan da Cunha is the main island of the Tristan da Cunha archipelago, which consists of the following islands:

- Tristan da Cunha, the main and largest island, area: 98 square kilometres (37.8 sq mi) (37°6′54″S 12°17′6″W)
- Inaccessible Island, area: 14 km^{2} (5.4 sq mi)
- Nightingale Islands, area: 3.4 km^{2} (1.3 sq mi)
  - Nightingale Island, area: 3.2 km^{2} (1.2 sq mi)
  - Middle Island, area: 0.1 km^{2} (25 acres)
  - Stoltenhoff Island, area: 0.1 km^{2} (25 acres)
- Gough Island (Gonçalo Álvares), area: 91 km^{2} (35 sq mi)

Inaccessible Island and the Nightingale Islands are 35 kilometres (22 mi) SW by W and SSW away from the main island, respectively, whereas Gough Island is 350 kilometres (217 mi) SSE.

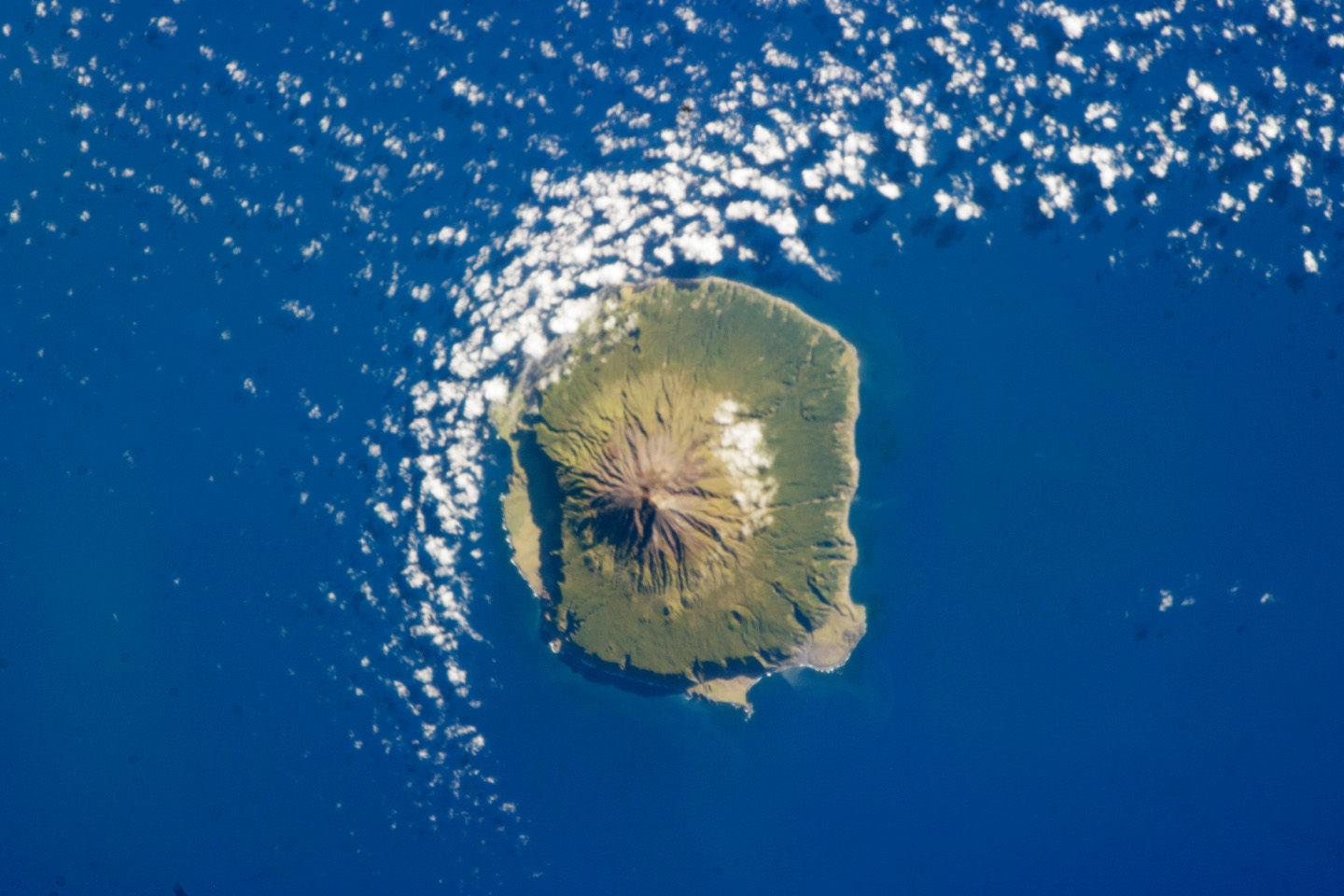
Tristan da Cunha on 6 February 2012, as seen from the International Space Station

The main island is generally mountainous. The only flat area is on the north-west coast, which is the location of the only settlement, Edinburgh of the Seven Seas, and the agricultural area of Potato Patches. The highest point is the summit of a volcano called Queen Mary's Peak at an elevation of 2,062 metres (6,765 ft), high enough to develop snow cover in winter. The other islands of the group are uninhabited, except for a weather station with a staff of six on Gough Island, which has been operated by South Africa since 1956 and has been at its present location at Transvaal Bay on the southeast coast since 1963.

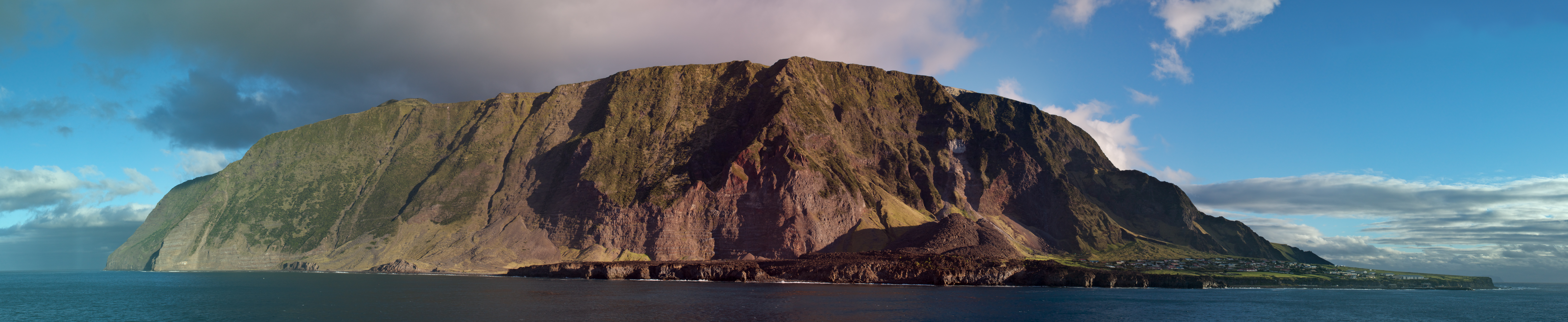
View of Tristan da Cunha

=== Climate ===
The archipelago has a Cfb, wet oceanic climate, under the Köppen system, with mild temperatures and very limited sunshine but consistent moderate-to-heavy rainfall due to the persistent westerly winds. Under the Trewartha classification, Tristan da Cunha has a humid subtropical climate due to the lack of cold weather. The number of rainy days is comparable to the Aleutian Islands at a much higher latitude in the northern hemisphere, while sunshine hours are comparable to Juneau, Alaska, 20° farther from the equator. Frost is unknown below elevations of 500 metres (1,600 ft), and summer temperatures are similarly mild, never reaching 25 °C (77 °F). Sandy Point on the east coast is reputed to be the warmest and driest place on the island, being in the lee of the prevailing winds.

Climate data for Tristan da Cunha
| Month | Jan | Feb | Mar | Apr | May | Jun | Jul | Aug | Sep | Oct | Nov | Dec | Year |
|---|---|---|---|---|---|---|---|---|---|---|---|---|---|
| Record high °C (°F) | 23.7 (74.7) | 24.4 (75.9) | 24.4 (75.9) | 22.4 (72.3) | 20.3 (68.5) | 18.7 (65.7) | 17.8 (64.0) | 17.3 (63.1) | 17.1 (62.8) | 18.4 (65.1) | 20.4 (68.7) | 21.8 (71.2) | 24.4 (75.9) |
| Mean daily maximum °C (°F) | 20.4 (68.7) | 21.2 (70.2) | 20.5 (68.9) | 18.9 (66.0) | 16.9 (62.4) | 15.3 (59.5) | 14.4 (57.9) | 14.2 (57.6) | 14.3 (57.7) | 15.4 (59.7) | 17.0 (62.6) | 18.9 (66.0) | 17.3 (63.1) |
| Daily mean °C (°F) | 17.9 (64.2) | 18.8 (65.8) | 17.9 (64.2) | 15.4 (59.7) | 14.6 (58.3) | 13.1 (55.6) | 12.2 (54.0) | 11.9 (53.4) | 12.0 (53.6) | 13.0 (55.4) | 14.6 (58.3) | 16.5 (61.7) | 14.8 (58.6) |
| Mean daily minimum °C (°F) | 15.4 (59.7) | 16.2 (61.2) | 15.3 (59.5) | 11.9 (53.4) | 12.3 (54.1) | 10.9 (51.6) | 10.0 (50.0) | 9.6 (49.3) | 9.7 (49.5) | 10.6 (51.1) | 12.2 (54.0) | 14.1 (57.4) | 12.4 (54.3) |
| Record low °C (°F) | 10.9 (51.6) | 11.8 (53.2) | 10.3 (50.5) | 9.5 (49.1) | 7.4 (45.3) | 6.3 (43.3) | 4.8 (40.6) | 4.6 (40.3) | 5.1 (41.2) | 6.4 (43.5) | 8.3 (46.9) | 9.7 (49.5) | 4.6 (40.3) |
| Average rainfall mm (inches) | 93 (3.7) | 113 (4.4) | 121 (4.8) | 129 (5.1) | 155 (6.1) | 160 (6.3) | 160 (6.3) | 175 (6.9) | 169 (6.7) | 151 (5.9) | 128 (5.0) | 127 (5.0) | 1,681 (66.2) |
| Average rainy days | 18 | 17 | 17 | 20 | 23 | 23 | 25 | 26 | 24 | 22 | 18 | 19 | 252 |
| Average relative humidity (%) | 79 | 77 | 75 | 78 | 78 | 79 | 79 | 79 | 78 | 79 | 79 | 80 | 78 |
| Mean monthly sunshine hours | 139.5 | 144.0 | 145.7 | 129.0 | 108.5 | 99.0 | 105.4 | 105.4 | 120.0 | 133.3 | 138.0 | 130.2 | 1,498 |
| Percentage possible sunshine | 31 | 35 | 38 | 38 | 35 | 34 | 34 | 32 | 33 | 33 | 32 | 29 | 34 |
Source 1: Worldwide Bioclimatic Classification System
Source 2: Climate and Temperature

== Geology ==
Tristan, along with its neighbouring islands, lies about 400 km (250 miles) east of the Mid-Atlantic Ridge. The volcanic activity is unrelated to the Mid-Atlantic Ridge; rather, it is due to a hotspot. The steep central cone (The Peak) is predominantly composed of pyroclastic deposits erupted from the central vent. The Base and Main Cliffs are composed mainly of thin basaltic lava flows, commonly separated by thin pyroclastic layers. There are over 30 cinder cones on the flanks of the main volcano, many of which have produced small lava flows. The October 1961 eruption was preceded by earthquake swarms and rock falls from the Main Cliffs, then lava was erupted on the plain immediately east of the settlement. The growing lava mound breached and lava flows erupted toward the coast. As the eruption waned, an elongate lava dome grew and sealed the vent.

Inaccessible Island, 35 km (22 miles) southwest of Tristan, is the relic of an older volcanic cone. Most of the island is composed of basaltic lava flows, but the southwestern part of Inaccessible has numerous trachyte domes and flows.

Nightingale Island, and nearby Middle and Stoltenhoff Islands, are 34 km (21 miles) south-southwest of Tristan. Nightingale is mostly composed of trachyte domes and flows, with some pyroclastic deposits. Middle Island is entirely composed of pyroclastic deposits (intruded by dykes), whereas Stoltenhoff Island is entirely composed of trachyte.

Tristan da Cunha is located in the South Atlantic Anomaly, an area of the Earth with an abnormally weak magnetic field. On 14 November 2008 a geomagnetic observatory was inaugurated on the island as part of a joint venture between the Danish Meteorological Institute and DTU Space.

=== Volcanoes ===
Tristan da Cunha has two volcanoes: Queen Mary's Peak on the main island and Edinburgh Peak on Gough Island. Queen Mary's Peak (37°6′42″S 12°17′19″W) has a height of 2,062 m (6,765 ft) and remains active, with its last eruption reported to have occurred in 1961. Edinburgh Peak (40°18′33″S 9°56′48″W) has a height of 902 m (2,959 ft) and is classified as extinct.

=== Geochemistry and tectonic significance ===
The volcanic rocks range from ankaramitic basanite through tephrite to phonolite and some have ultra-potassic compositions, which is unusual for rocks that erupted close to the Mid-Atlantic Ridge. They exemplify the EM1 pole in compilations of isotopic compositions of mantle-derived rocks. The unusual composition is explained by the presence of enriched material in a mantle plume source, either recycled sediments or metasomatised lithosphere. The origin of the islands is commonly attributed to partial melting in a mantle plume. The islands are located at the western end of the Walvis Ridge, which links the islands to the Etendeka large igneous province. This association has been cited as an example of plume head and tail hypothesis, but the geochemical characteristics of Tristan lavas differ from those of the Etendeka province, which suggests that the plume was heterogeneous.

== Flora and fauna ==
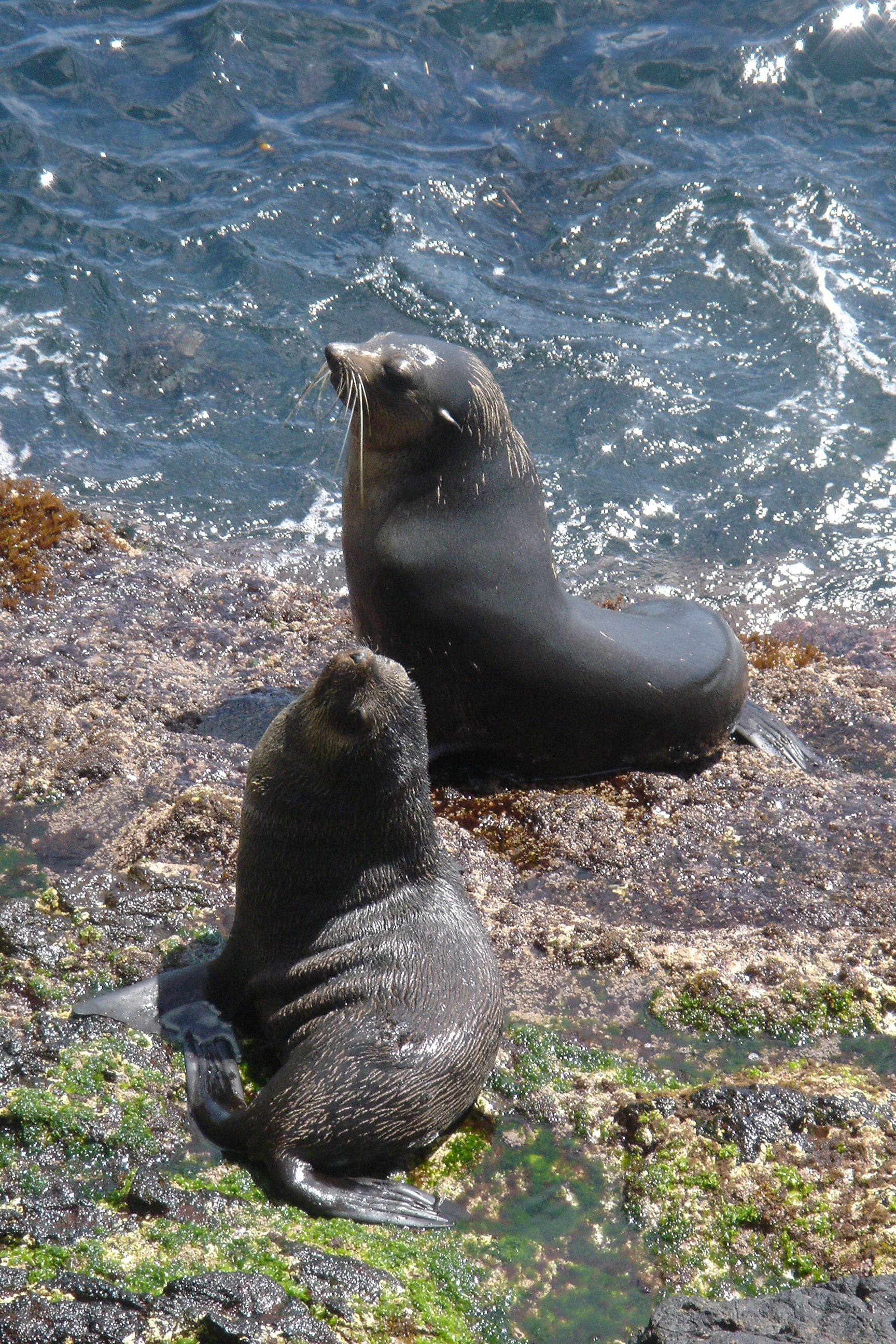
Subantarctic fur seals at Gough and Inaccessible Islands

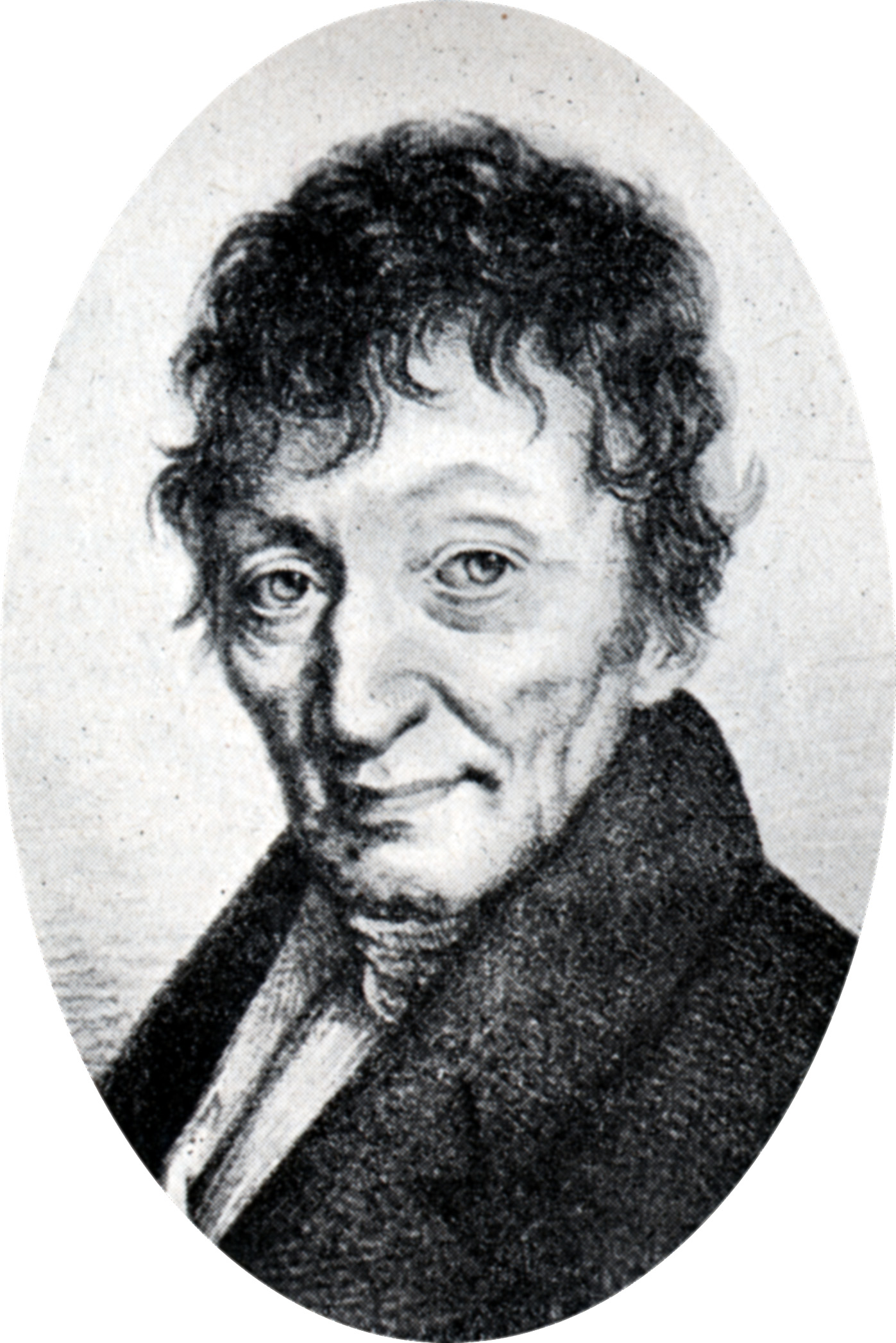
French nobleman and botanist Louis-Marie Aubert du Petit-Thouars, commemorated in the nomenclature of a variety of plants (e.g. Carex thouarsii) native to Tristan da Cunha

Many of the flora and fauna of the archipelago have a broad circumpolar distribution in the South Atlantic and South Pacific Oceans. For example, the plant species Nertera granadensis was first collected in Tristan da Cunha, but has since been recorded as far away as New Zealand.

=== Invasive species ===
The islands of Tristan da Cunha have a high significance of global biodiversity: two of them, Gough and Inaccessible, form a UNESCO natural World Heritage Site. This designation is largely due to the seabird population found there. The biodiversity of the island is vulnerable to the introduction of invasive species. Due to Tristan da Cunha's isolated archipelago ecology, and increase of tourism with cruise ships and research vessels, invasive species are a particular concern for Tristan da Cunha. The islands' vegetation and mammal species are not equipped to defend against or control introduced species, increasing island vulnerability, due to lack of defensive behavioural mechanisms and slow generational output rates. Efforts to decrease and eradicate invasive flora, fauna, and marine species have been undertaken, including a programme aimed at eradicating predatory invasive mice on Gough Island.

Invasive house mice on these islands have adapted to be 50% larger than average house mice. They are thought to have been accidentally introduced by 19th-century seal hunters who would dock on the islands. These mice have adapted by consuming seabird eggs and chicks (as they nest on the ground). Gathering at night in groups of 9 or 10, the mice gather at the bird's nest to feast. With no natural predators, the invasive mice population can expand by producing new generations twice a year.

To prevent the growth of the invasive mice population and extinction of the Albatross bird species, a 2019 Gough Island mouse eradication project was announced. The RSPB and Tristan da Cunha Government have partnered to spread cereal pellets with rodenticide bait across Gough Island, in hopes to eradicate the invasive mice population. The goal of this operation is to restore Tristan da Cunha to its natural state, ensuring it will still be one of the world's most important seabird nesting sites.

=== Flora ===
==== Native plants ====
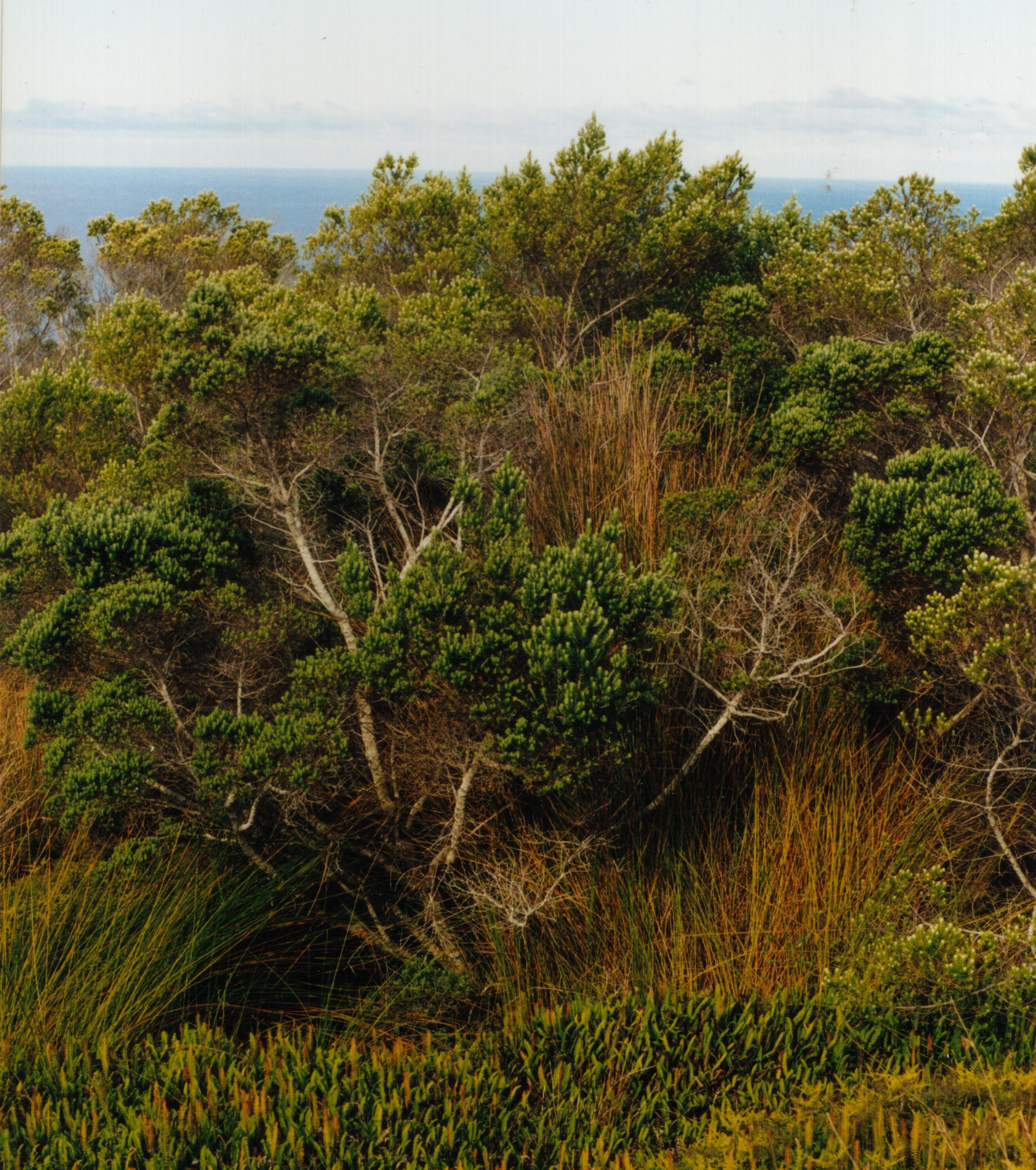
Phylica arborea, the only tree species native (though not endemic) to Tristan da Cunha

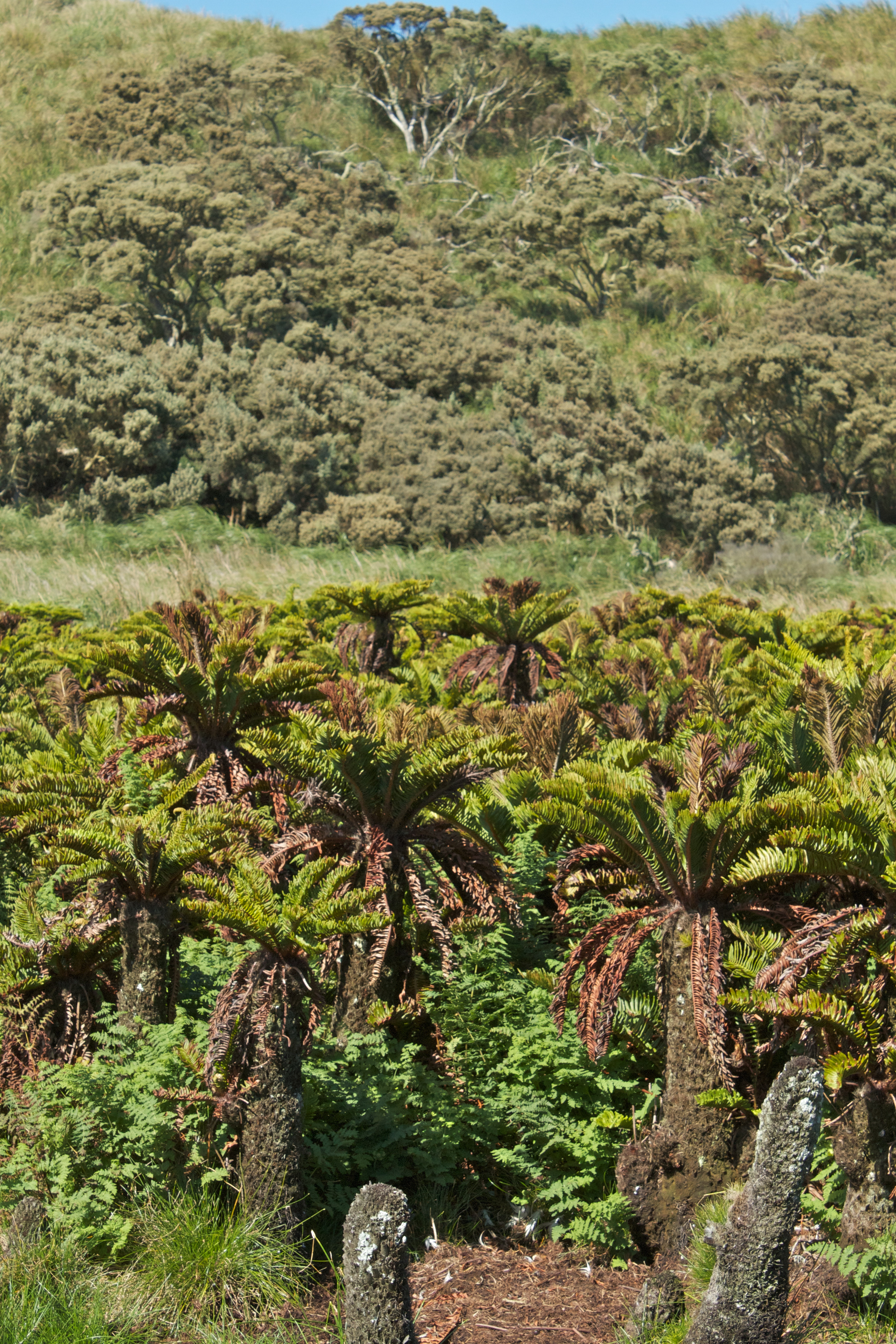
A stand of Tristan's endemic tree fern, Lomariocycas palmiformis, the fernbush

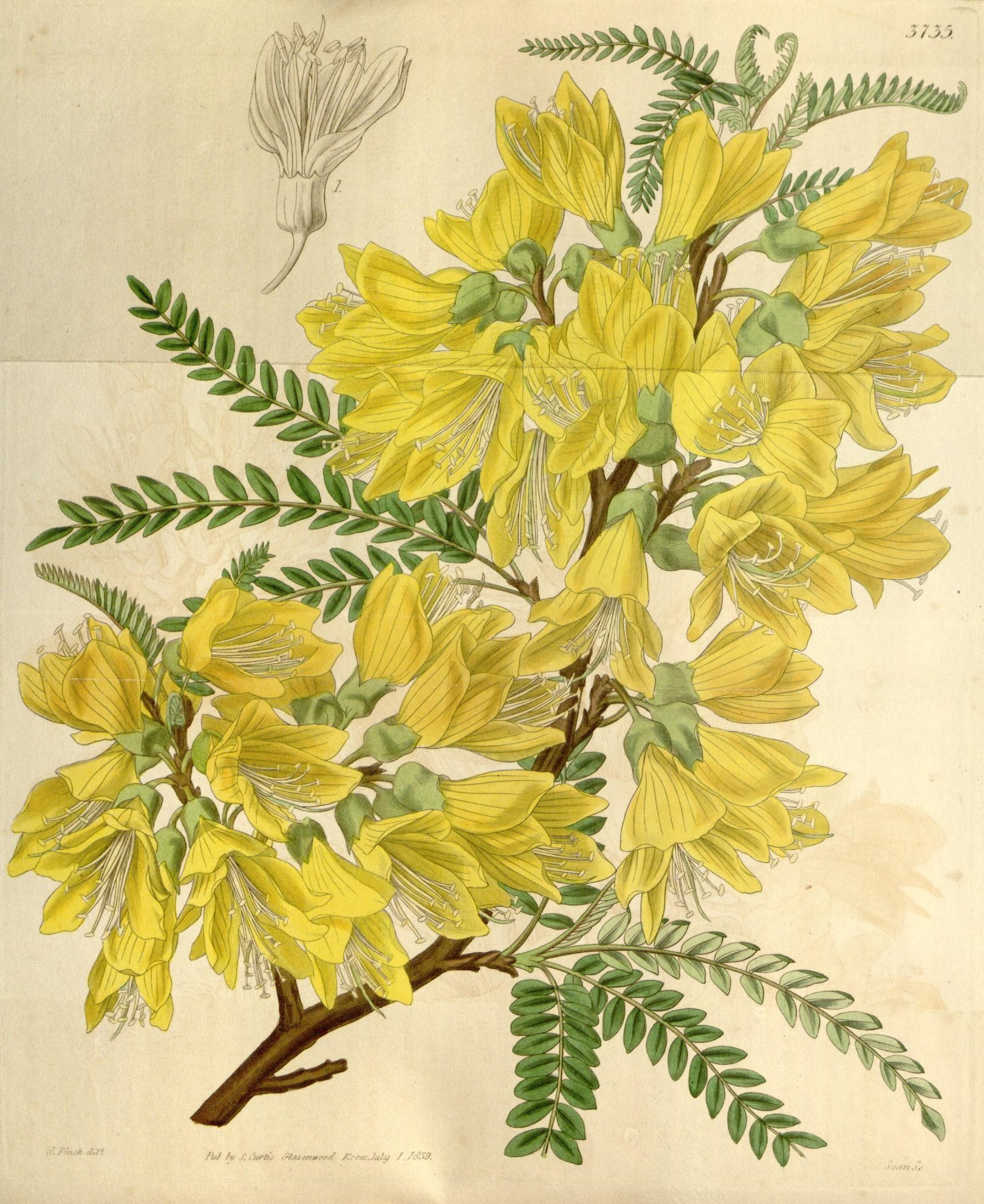
Sophora macnabiana (Fabaceae): coloured plate depicting the shrub in flower from Curtis's Botanical Magazine

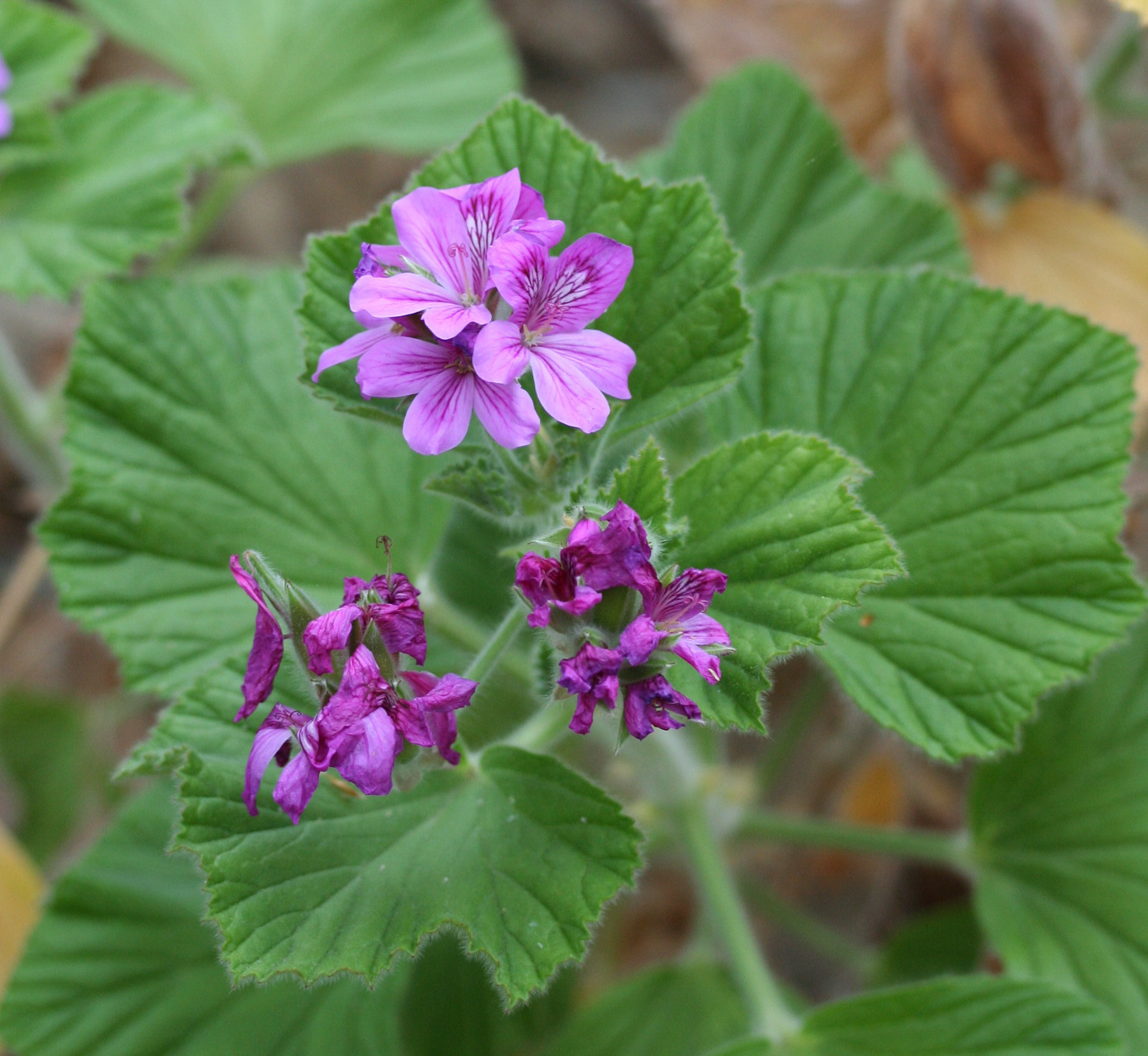
Pelargonium cucullatum, a species native to both Tristan da Cunha and South Africa

A combination of the list on Kew's Plants of the World Online site with information from a paper by Wace and Holdgate yields the following list (by no means exhaustive) of plant species recorded as native to Tristan da Cunha.

Eudicots

- Apium australe Thouars (Apiaceae)
- Atriplex plebeia Carmich. (Amaranthaceae)
- Callitriche christensenii Christoph. (Plantaginaceae)
- Chevreulia sarmentosa (Pers.) S.F.Blake (Asteraceae)
- Cotula goughensis Rud. Brown (Asteraceae)
- Cotula moseleyi Hemsl. (Asteraceae)
- Dysphania tomentosa (Thouars) Mosyakin & Clemants (Amaranthaceae)
- Empetrum rubrum Vahl ex Willd. (Ericaceae)
- Gamochaeta thouarsii (Spreng.) Anderb. (Asteraceae)
- Gnaphalium thouarsii Spreng. (Asteraceae)
- Hydrocotyle capitata Thouars (Araliaceae)
- Nertera granadensis Druce (Rubiaceae)
- Pelargonium cucullatum (L.) L'Hér. (Geraniaceae)
- Pelargonium grossularioides (L.) L'Hér. (Geraniaceae)
- Phylica arborea Thouars (Rhamnaceae)
- Rumex frutescens Thouars (Polygonaceae)
- Sophora macnabiana (Graham) Skottsb. (Fabaceae)

Commelinids

- Agrostis carmichaelii Schult. & Schult.f. (Poaceae)
- Agrostis crinum-ursi Mez (Poaceae)
- Agrostis media Carmich. (Poaceae)
- Agrostis trachychlaena C.E. Hubbard (Poaceae)
- Carex insularis Carmich. (Cyperaceae)
- Carex thouarsii Carmich. (Cyperaceae)
- Deschampsia wacei C.E.Hubb. (Poaceae)
- Isolepis bicolor Carmich. (Cyperaceae)
- Isolepis moseleyana (Boeckeler) Muasya (Cyperaceae)
- Isolepis prolifera (Rottb.) R.Br. (Cyperaceae)
- Isolepis sulcata (Thouars) Carmich. (Cyperaceae)
- Sporobolus mobberleyanus P.M.Peterson & Saarela (Poaceae)
- Rostkovia tristanensis Christoph. (Juncaceae)

Ferns, mosses and clubmosses

- Asplenium aequibasis (C.Chr.) J.P.Roux (Aspleniaceae)
- Asplenium alvarezense Rudm. Brown (Aspleniaceae)
- Athyrium medium (Carmich.) T.Moore (Athyriaceae)
- Austroblechnum penna-marina (Poir.) Gasper & V.A.O.Dittrich (Blechnaceae)
- Elaphoglossum laurifolium (Thouars) T.Moore (Dryopteridaceae)
- Lomariocycas palmiformis (Thouars) C.Chr. (Blechnaceae)
- Lycopodium diaphanum (P.Beauv.) Sw. (Lycopodiaceae)
- Notogrammitis angustifolia (Jacq.) Parris (Polypodiaceae)
- Notogrammitis billardierei (Willdenow) Parris (Polypodiaceae)
- Polyphlebium angustatum (Carmich.) Ebihara & Dubuisson (Hymenophyllaceae)
- Racomitrium lanuginosum (Hedw.) Brid. (Grimmiaceae)
- Rumohra adiantiformis (G.Forst.) Ching (Dryopteridaceae)

==== Introduced plants ====
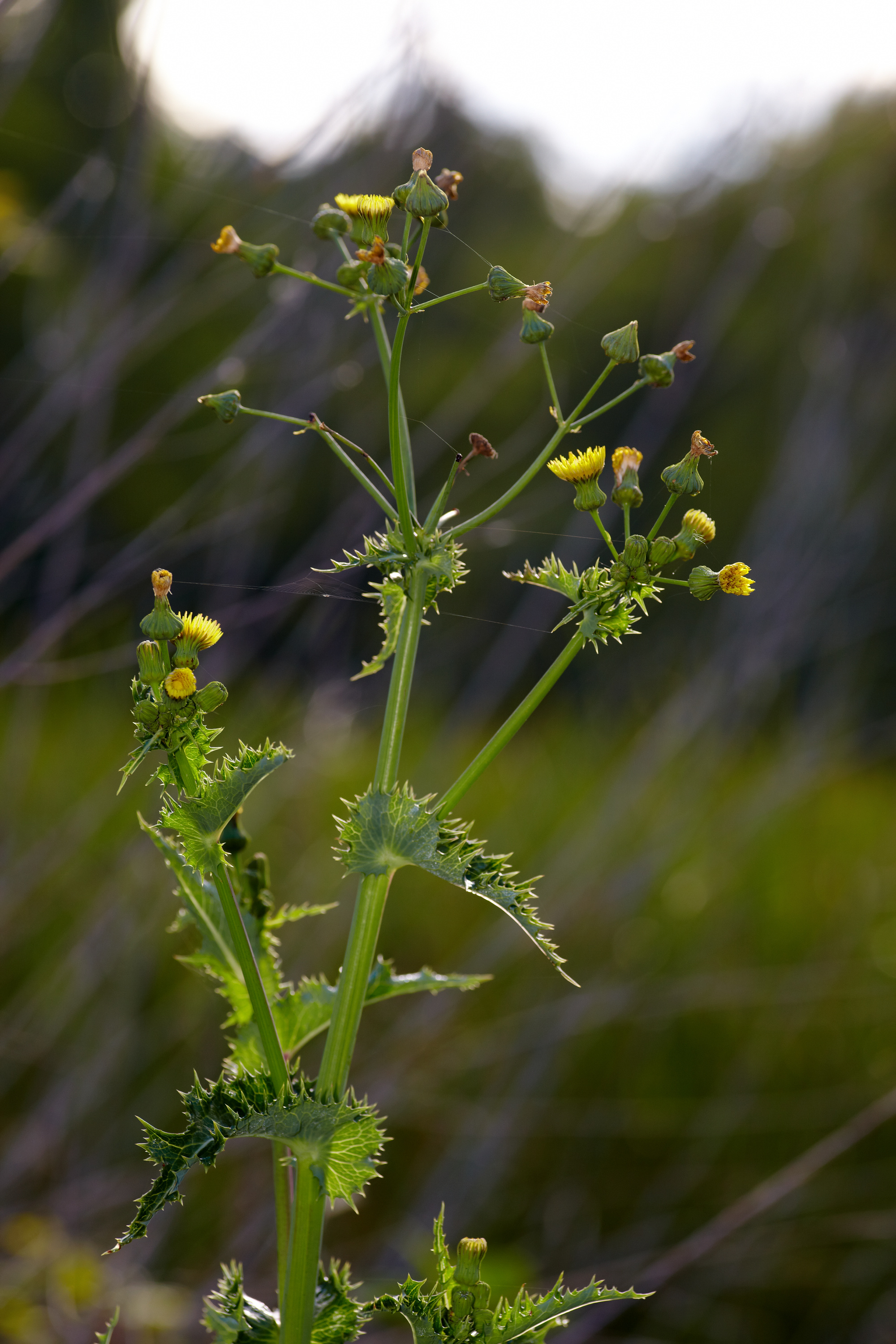
Sonchus asper, an introduced weed common on Tristan

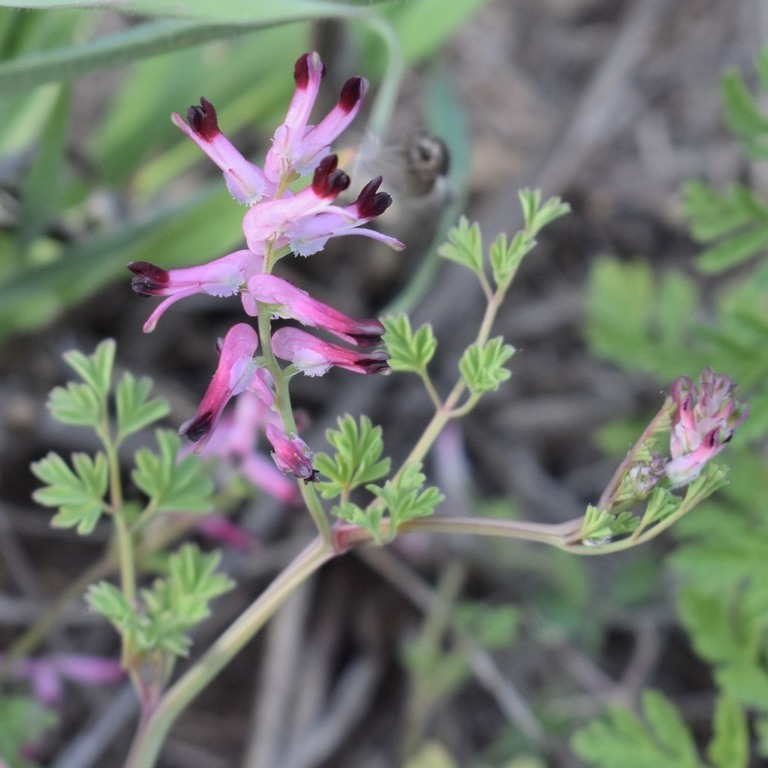
Fumaria muralis

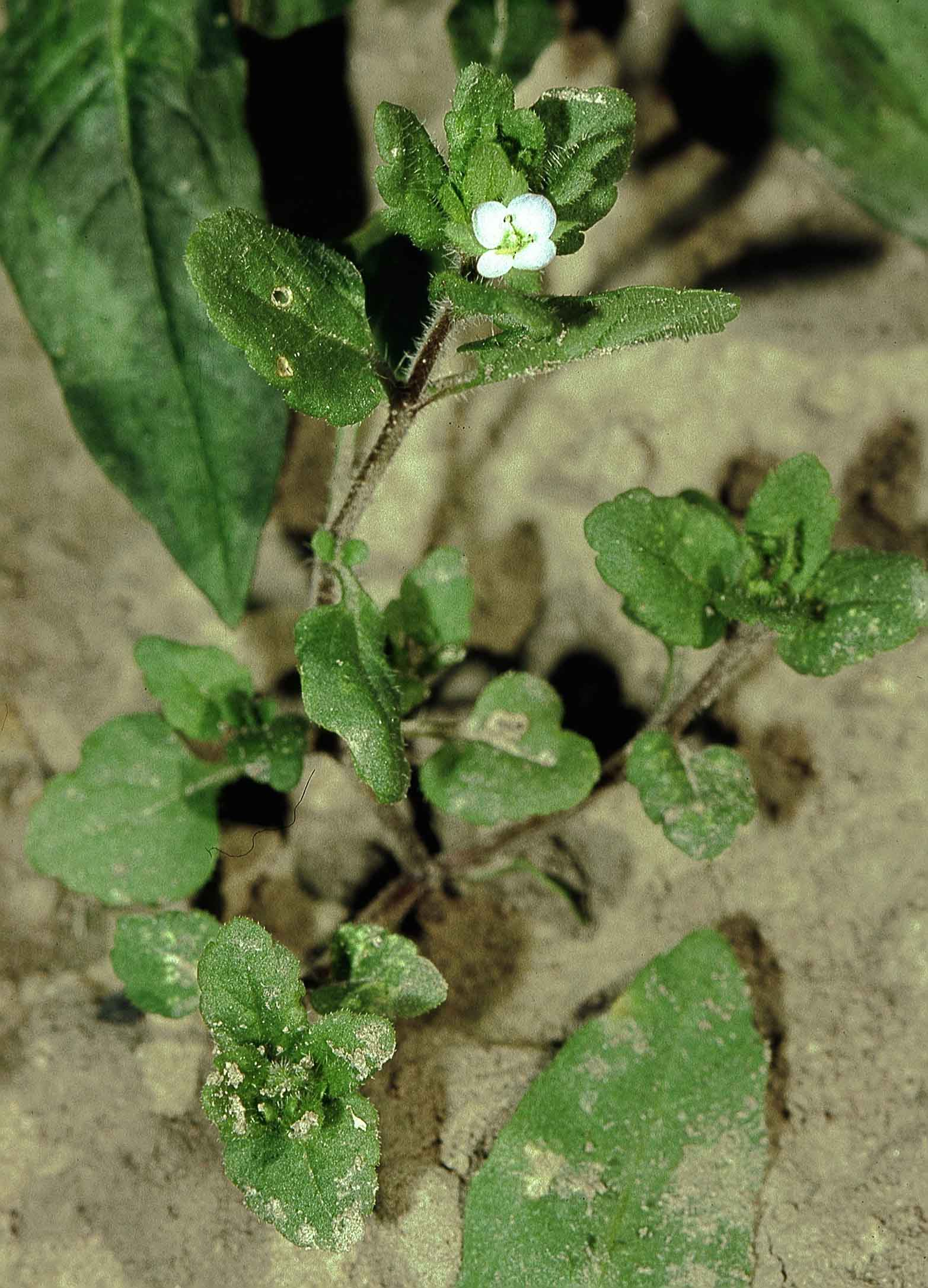
Veronica agrestis

Tristan da Cunha acquired an estimated 137 non-native vascular plants that can be categorised into four species types: weeds (trees, shrubs, agricultural weeds), grassland species (grasses), garden escapes (vegetables), and other ruderal species. Vascular plants were accidentally introduced in a variety of ways including: impurities in flower or vegetable seeds; seeds or plant fragments from other imported plants; and in soil, attached to containers, cars or people. The majority of invasive weed species that have been introduced to the island are spread by seed and cover 50% of arable land in widely distributed patches. These species include prickly sow-thistle (Sonchus asper), smooth sow-thistle (Sonchus oleraceus), smooth hawksbeard (Crepis capillaris), scrambling fumitory (Fumaria muralis), green field speedwell (Veronica agrestis), groundsel (Senecio vulgaris), and nutgrass (Cyperus esculentus). Whether a species is distributed locally or widely depends on the seed's dispersal mechanisms; larger seeds that have not adapted to wind dispersal will be distributed locally, while smaller seeds that have adapted to wind dispersal will be widely distributed.

The invasive plants have had several negative impacts on native island plant species, including the competitive exclusion of many such species. The out-competition can and will alter the structure of plant communities and the quality of the islands' soil. Introduced vegetation has altered long-term carbon storage as well as the reduction of CO_{2} in the atmosphere. Native plants such as fern bushes, Phylica bushes, fern brakes, mires, and bogs, contain high organic content matter which functions as storage for carbon. With the introduction of harmful species, the islands will see a decrease in carbon storage of both the soil and vegetation. With multiple changes occurring within the soil due to invasive plant species, the nutrient cycle is bound to be negatively influenced. Invasive plants are also affecting the human population of Tristan da Cunha by being disease carriers and becoming agricultural pests in gardens and pastures.

The alien plants are able to survive and continue to grow and spread successfully on the islands because they have the ability to naturalise in temperate regions and have limited necessities needed to survive. The islands' isolation increases archipelago ecology uniqueness, which increases susceptibility to foreign invaders. A small human population with minimal development encourages flora and fauna development within a limited food web, which increases the invasive species' abilities for self-defence.

Plants are being controlled by taking surveys of the invasive species, evaluating their impact on biodiversity, and evaluating the feasibility of their eradication. It would be nearly impossible to try to eradicate all invasive plant species, so scientists are narrowing down to control particular species based on their impact and feasibility to eradicate. Mitigation plans that are taking place on Tristan are time-consuming and labour-intensive and will take several years using mechanical and chemical procedures.

=== Fauna ===
==== Land ====
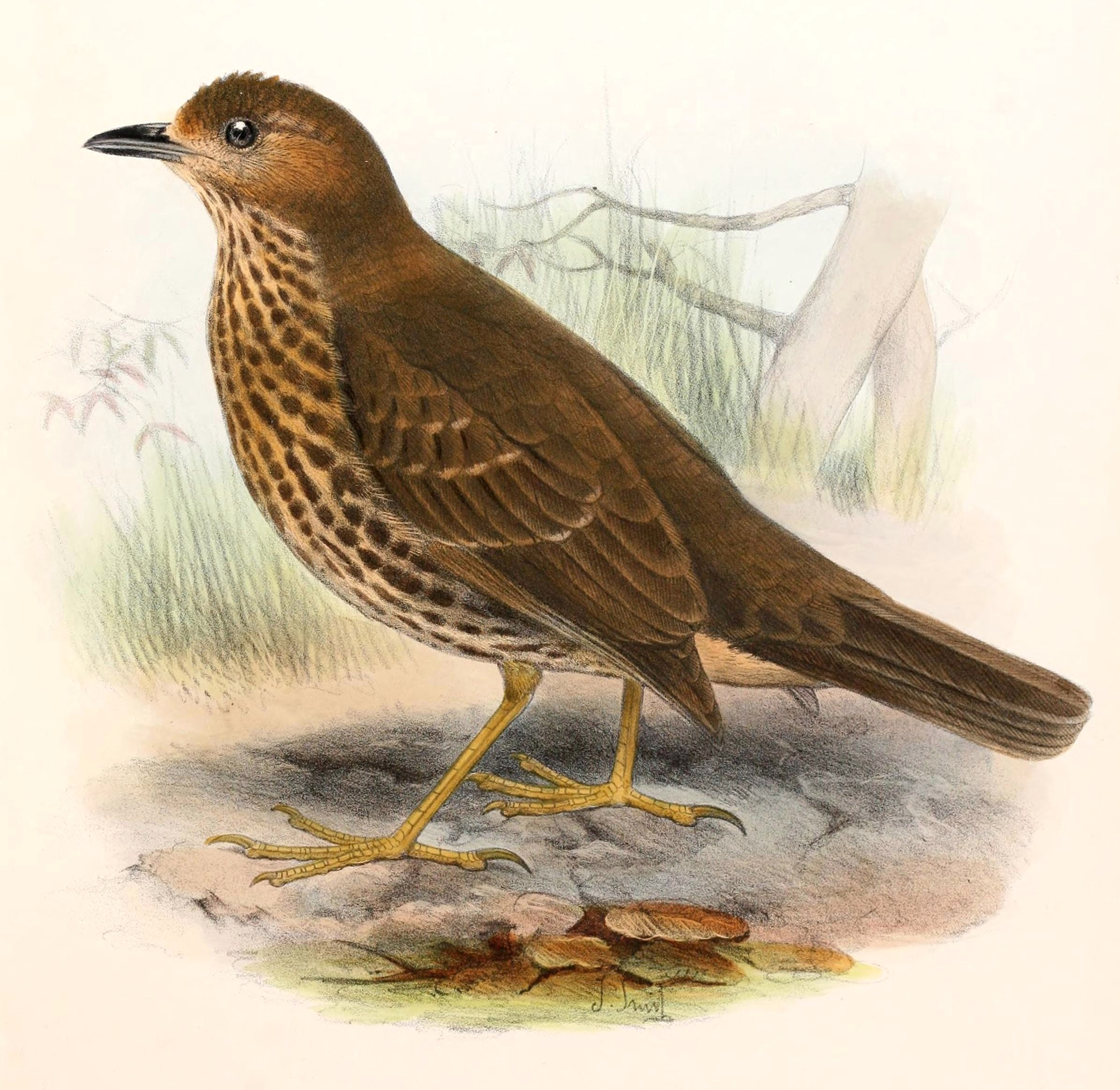
Tristan thrush Turdus eremita (formerly Nesocichla eremita)

Tristan is primarily known for its wildlife. The island has been identified as an Important Bird Area by BirdLife International because there are 13 known species of breeding seabirds on the island and two species of resident land birds. The seabirds include northern rockhopper penguins, Atlantic yellow-nosed albatrosses, sooty albatrosses, Atlantic petrels, great-winged petrels, soft-plumaged petrels, broad-billed prions, grey petrels, great shearwaters, sooty shearwaters, Tristan skuas, Antarctic terns and brown noddies. Tristan and Gough Islands are the only known breeding sites in the world for the Atlantic petrel. Inaccessible Island is also the only known breeding ground of the spectacled petrel. The Tristan albatross is known to breed only on Gough and Inaccessible Islands: all nest on Gough, except for one or two pairs which nest on Inaccessible Island.

The endemic Tristan thrush, also known as the "starchy", occurs on all of the northern islands and each has its own subspecies, with Tristan birds being slightly smaller and duller than those on Nightingale and Inaccessible. The endemic Inaccessible Island rail, the smallest extant flightless bird in the world, is found only on Inaccessible Island. The Tristan Moorhen was an endemic species to Tristan, but is now extinct. In 1956, eight Gough moorhens were released at Sandy Point on Tristan and have subsequently colonised the island.

==== Marine ====
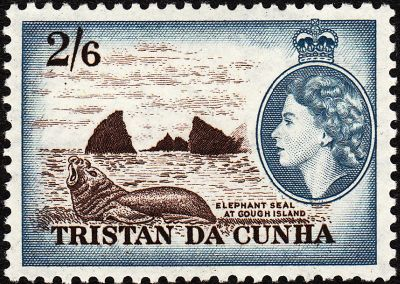
1954 Tristan da Cunha stamp depicting "elephant seal at Gough Island"

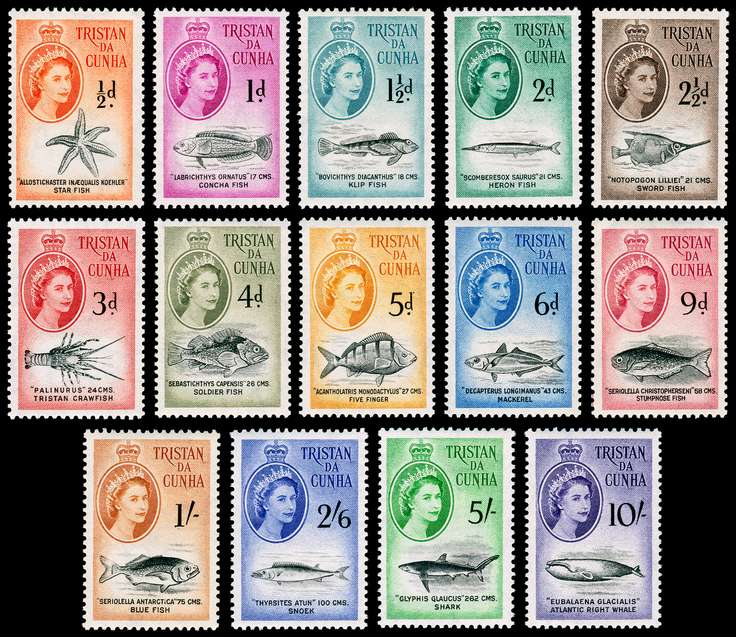
Tristan da Cunha 1960 Marine Life stamps

The largest no take zone in the Atlantic, and at 687,247 square kilometres (265,348 sq mi), the fourth largest in the world, was designated on 13 November 2020. The Marine Protected Area bans mining and fishing (except the local lobster fishery), with enforcement the responsibility of the UK government via satellite surveillance. According to the Royal Society for the Protection of Birds (RSPB), the islands and surrounding ocean is one of the most pristine temperate ecosystems on the planet.

Various species of whales and dolphins can be seen around Tristan from time to time with increasing sighting rates, although recovery of baleen whales, especially the southern right whale, were severely hindered by illegal whaling by the Soviet Union in the aftermath of the 1960 volcanic eruption. The subantarctic fur seal (Arctophoca tropicalis) can also be found in the Tristan archipelago, mostly on Gough Island.

The biodiversity of marine life is limited given the islands' isolation, making identifying the impacts of invasion difficult. While much of the marine life is unknown, there has been an invasive species identified in the waters around the islands. This species is the South American silver porgy (Diplodus argenteus argenteus), which is thought to have sought refuge in the area due to the wreck of an oil platform off the coast of Tristan in 2006. The silver porgy is omnivorous, but is not linked to the consumption of the valued lobster populations that the islanders fish. The silver porgy is however suspected to be consuming components of the islands' fragile kelp forest. The giant kelp forests of Macrocystis pyrifera are extremely limited in biodiversity and have a simple, short-chain food web. While this species is considered non-native and invasive, removal efforts are currently not prioritised. Continued monitoring is suggested, and expedition research for all invasive marine species is ongoing.

== Economy ==
The island has a unique social and economic structure in which all resident families farm and all land is communally owned. Outsiders are prohibited from buying land or settling on Tristan. Besides subsistence agriculture, major industries are commercial fishing and government. Major export industries are the Tristan rock lobster (Jasus) fishery, the sale of the island's postage stamps and coins, and limited tourism. When the UK left the EU, Tristan da Cunha lost its membership in the EU's Overseas Countries and Territories Association.

The Bank of Saint Helena was established on Saint Helena and Ascension Island in 2004. This bank does not have a physical presence on Tristan da Cunha, but residents of Tristan are entitled to its services. Although Tristan da Cunha is part of the same overseas territory as Saint Helena, it does not use the local Saint Helena pound; sterling is used directly instead.

=== Transport ===
Map of Edinburgh of the Seven Seas

The remote location of the islands makes transport to the outside world difficult. Tristan da Cunha has no airstrip and is not generally accessible to air travel, though the wider territory is served by Saint Helena Airport and RAF Ascension Island. Boats sailing from South Africa provide transport service to the islands with ten voyages per year.

RMS St Helena used to connect the main island to St Helena and South Africa once each year during its January voyage, but has done so only a few times in the last years – in 2006, in 2011, and most recently in 2018. In the same year RMS St Helena was withdrawn from service. Three ships, MV Lance, MFV Edinburgh, and SA Agulhas II, regularly service Tristan da Cunha from Cape Town, with typically fewer than a dozen visits a year. Other vessels may occasionally visit the island. The harbour at Edinburgh of the Seven Seas is called Calshot Harbour, named after the place in Hampshire, England, where the islanders temporarily stayed during the 1961–1963 Queen Mary's Peak volcanic eruption.

=== Tourism ===
Tristan da Cunha has a very small tourism industry. As the island can only be reached from Cape Town on vessels with limited vacancies, a trip must be planned months in advance, and only after a visit request is approved by the Island Council.

Occasional boats or cruises may include a short visit to the island in their itinerary, but as there is no deep harbour, setting ashore is highly dependent on the maritime conditions. All visitors staying on Tristan must have a confirmed and fully paid return ticket, health insurance to include cover in case of medical evacuation to Cape Town, and sufficient funds to cover their entire stay. There are no hotels on the island. A visitor can rent a guest house (catered or self-catering) or stay in a private home on a full-board basis. There is a Tourism Post Office that sells souvenirs that might take months to arrive if ordered online.

The Tristan Government has a public website. It includes an online shop, a list of recent news about and on the island, and a simple online tour.

=== Communications ===
==== Telecommunication ====
The ITU has assigned telephone country code +290 for Tristan da Cunha; however, residents have access to the Foreign and Commonwealth Office Telecommunications Network, provided by Global Crossing. This service uses a London 020 numbering range, meaning that numbers are accessed via the UK telephone numbering plan. Satellite-delivered internet access arrived in Tristan da Cunha in 1998, but its high cost initially made it almost unaffordable for the local population, who primarily used it only to send e‑mail. The connection was also extremely unreliable, connecting through a 64 kbit/s satellite phone connection provided by Inmarsat. On 16 September 2024, satellite internet via Starlink was made available on the island, offering much higher speeds than previously available.

Since 2006, a very-small-aperture terminal has provided bandwidth for government purposes that is also made available via an internet café and (after office hours) via Wi-Fi to island homes. As of 2016, there is not yet any mobile telephone coverage on the islands.

The Government and Tristan da Cunha Association jointly run the island official website with all practical information, news, and facts about the island. While the site is updated from mainland UK, due to slow internet, the photos taken and uploaded from Tristan da Cunha are all in low resolution, which allows online navigation in the territory with acceptable speed.

==== Amateur radio ====
Amateur radio operator groups sometimes conduct DX-peditions on the island. One group operated as station ZD9ZS in September–October 2014.

== Government ==
There are no political parties or trade unions on Tristan. Executive authority is vested in the King, who is represented in the territory by the governor of Tristan da Cunha. Prior to 2009, Tristan da Cunha was a dependency of Saint Helena, and therefore directly represented by the governor of Saint Helena. The St Helena, Ascension and Tristan da Cunha Constitution Order 2009 made Saint Helena, Ascension Island, and Tristan da Cunha equal constituent parts of the territory with their own governments, and established the position of governor of Tristan da Cunha. Per section 208 of the Constitution Order, the person appointed as governor of Saint Helena is ex officio governor of Tristan da Cunha. However, as Tristan da Cunha is 1,350 miles (2,170 km) away from Saint Helena, an Administrator of Tristan da Cunha is appointed to act as the governor's representative on the island.

This arrangement predates the current constitutional structure, and the first administrator was appointed in the 1940s. Previously, the administrator also acted as the local magistrate, but the appointment is to be transferred to a non-member of the executive or legislative branches of government. The administrator is a career civil servant in the Foreign Office, selected by London, who acts as the local head of government and takes advice from the Tristan da Cunha Island Council. Since 1998, each administrator has usually served a three-year term (which begins in September, upon arrival of the supply ship from Cape Town). Fiona Kilpatrick and Stephen Townsend were exceptions to this rule, having taken up their job-share office in January 2020.

The Administrator and Island Council work from the Government Building, which is the only two-story building on the island. The building is sometimes referred to as "Whitehall" or the "H'admin Building" and contains the Administrator's Office, Treasury Department, Administration Offices, and the Council Chamber where Island Council meetings are held. Policing is undertaken by one full-time police inspector and three special constables. Tristan da Cunha has some legislation of its own, but the law of Saint Helena applies generally to the extent that it is not inconsistent with local law, insofar as it is suitable for local circumstances and subject to such modifications as local circumstances make necessary.

=== Chief Islander ===
The Island Council is made up of eight elected and three appointed members, who serve a three-year term beginning in February or March. A separate but simultaneous vote is held to select the Chief Islander, who is the community's political leader. Ian Lavarello was elected to the position in March 2025.

== Demographics ==
Historical population
| Year | Pop. | ±% p.a. |
|---|---|---|
| 1856 | 71 | — |
| 1880 | 109 | +1.80% |
| 1892 | 50 | −6.29% |
| 1897 | 64 | +5.06% |
| 1901 | 74 | +3.70% |
| 1909 | 95 | +3.17% |
| 1934 | 167 | +2.28% |
| 1961 | 268 | +1.77% |
| 1969 | 271 | +0.14% |
| 1987 | 296 | +0.49% |
| 1999 | 286 | −0.29% |
| 2000 | 280 | −2.10% |
| 2008 | 269 | −0.50% |
| 2016 | 293 | +1.07% |
| 2018 | 250 | −7.63% |
| 2021 | 243 | −0.94% |

Tristan da Cunha recorded a population of 243 in the June 2021 census. The only settlement is Edinburgh of the Seven Seas (known locally as "The Settlement"). The current residents are thought to have descended from fifteen outside ancestors, eight male and seven female, who arrived on the island at various dates between 1816 and 1908. The men were European, and the women were mixed race. Now all of the population has mixed ancestry. In addition, a male contributor of eastern European / Russian descent arrived in the early 1900s. In 1963, when families returned after the evacuation due to the 1961 volcanic eruption, the 200 settlers included four Tristan da Cunha women who brought with them new English husbands.

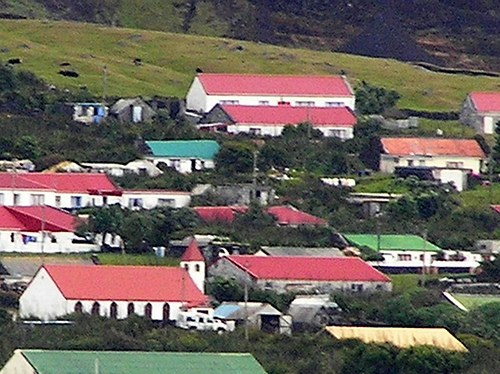
Housing in Tristan da Cunha

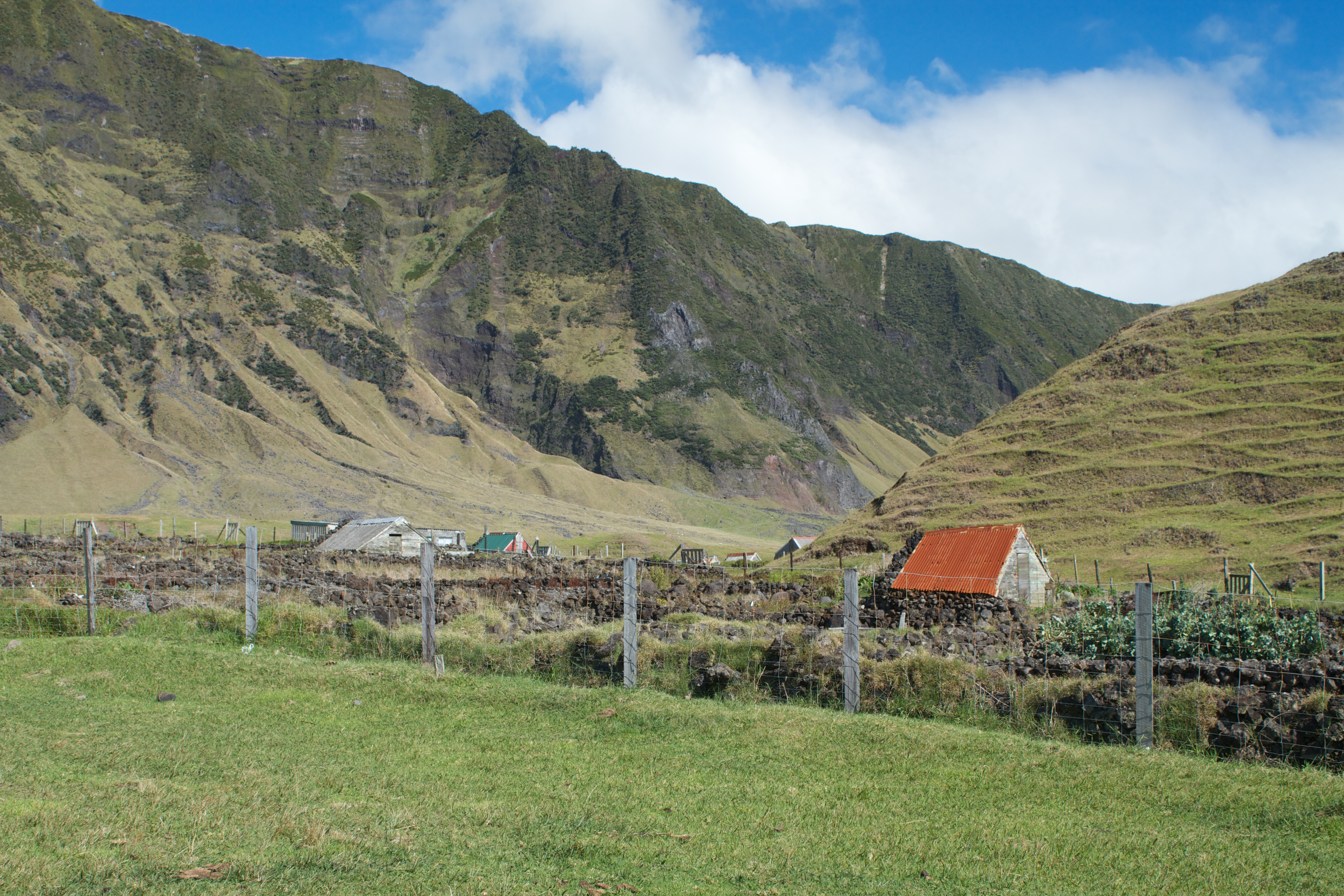
Potato patches

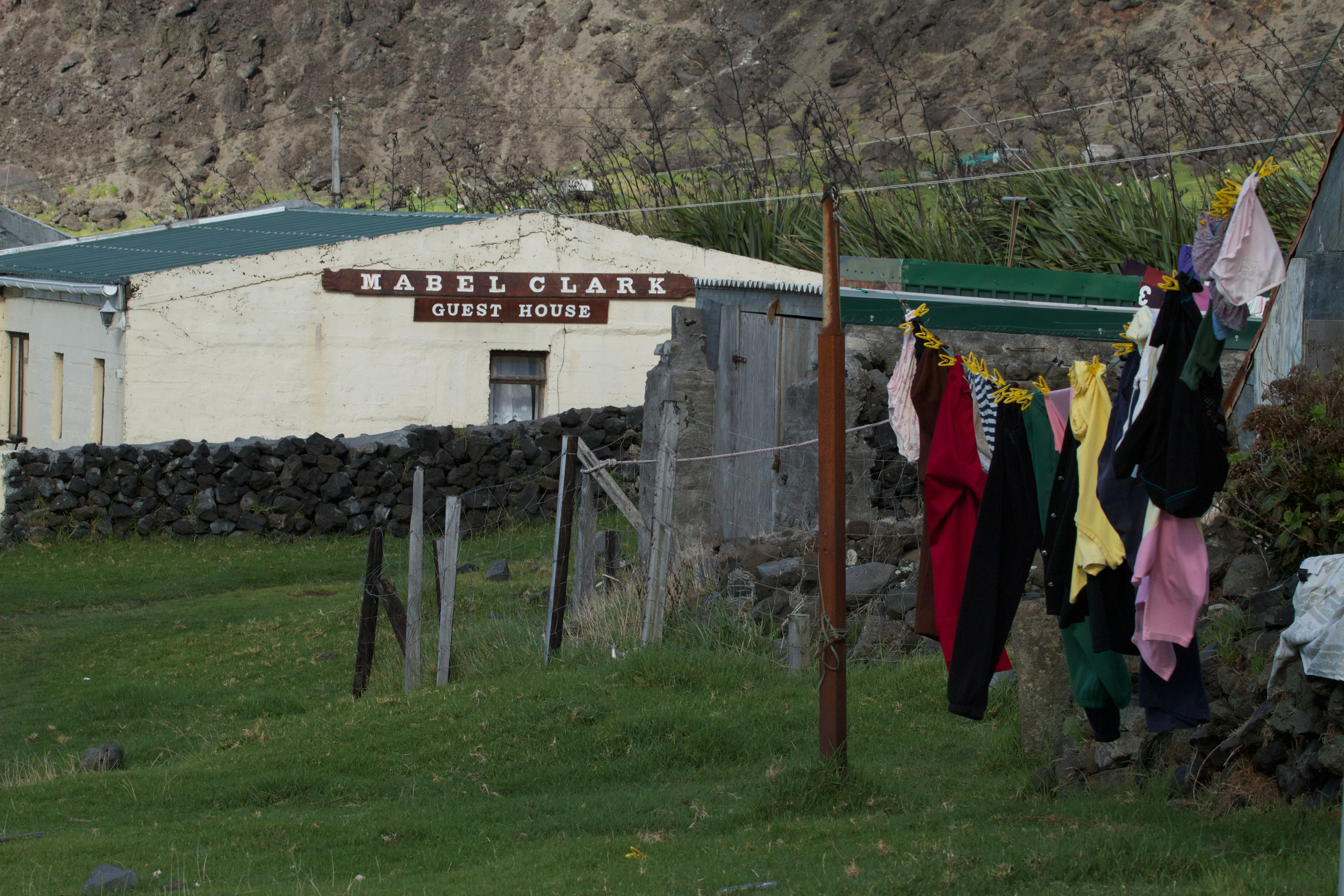
Guest houses provide accommodation for visitors, as there are no hotels on the island.

The female descendants have been traced by genetic study to five female founders, believed to be of mixed race (African, Asian, and European descent) and from Saint Helena. The historical data recounted that there were two pairs of sisters, but the mtDNA evidence showed only one pair of sisters.

The early male founders originated from Scotland, England, the Netherlands, the United States, and Italy, who belonged to three Y-haplogroups: I (M170), R-SRY10831.2, and R (M207) (xSRY10831.2). The male founders shared seven surnames: Glass, Green, Hagan, Lavarello, Repetto, Rogers, and Swain. (Note: The seven surnames are thought to have been immigrants who were Scottish (Rogers), Dutch (Glass), English (Green, Swain), Irish (Hagan), Italian (Lavarello, Repetto) (both probably Ligurian).) The surnames Collins, Squibb, and Patterson were brought to the island by Tristanian women, returning with their English husbands from the evacuation of the early 1960s. The surnames Collins and Squibb continue to be used on the island. In addition, a new haplotype was found that is associated with men from Eastern Europe and Russia. It entered the population in the early 1900s, at a time when the island was visited by Russian sailing ships. There is "evidence for the contribution of a hidden ancestor who left his genes, but not his name, on the island." Another four instances of non-paternity were found among male descendants, but researchers believed their fathers were probably among the early island population.

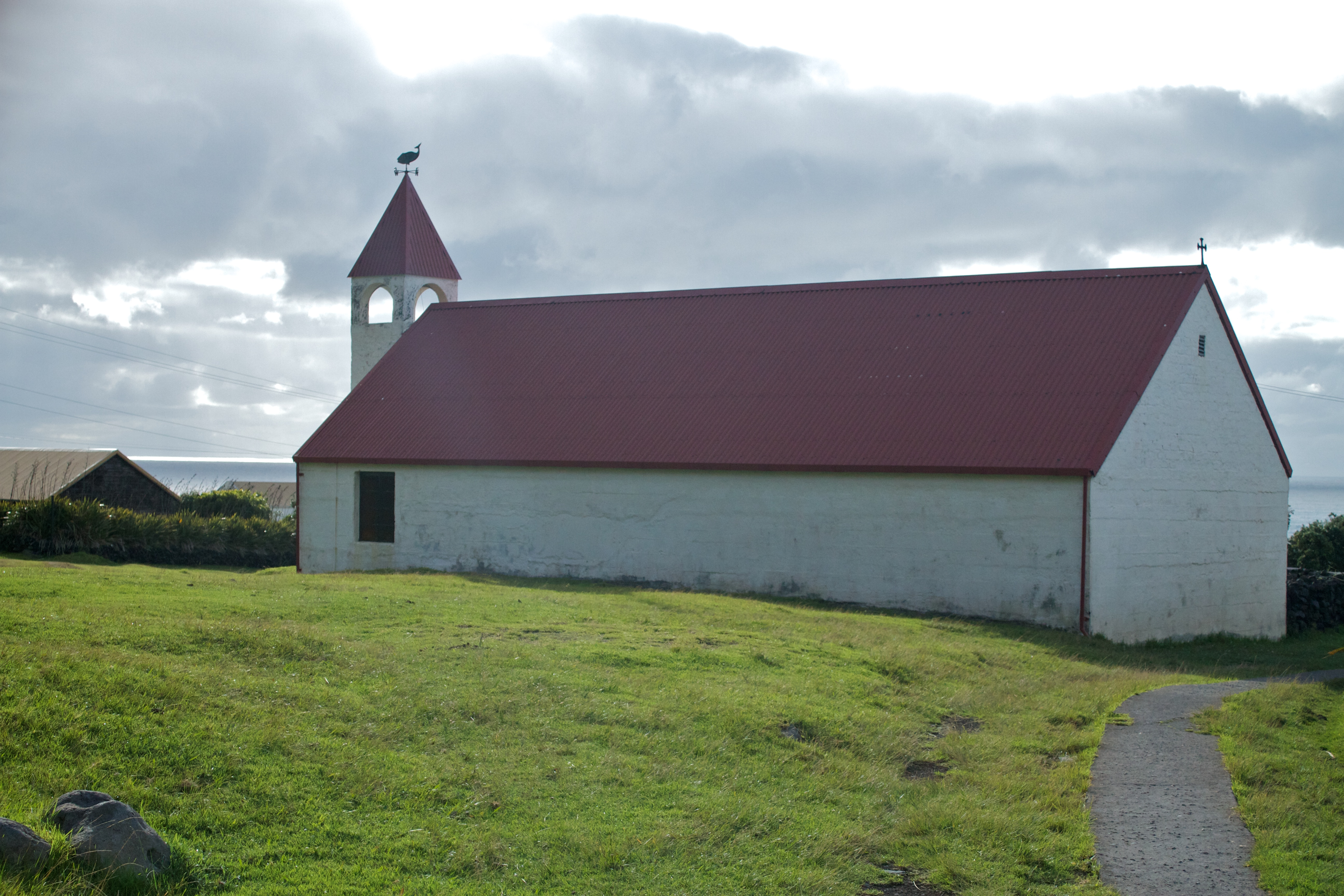
St Joseph's Catholic church

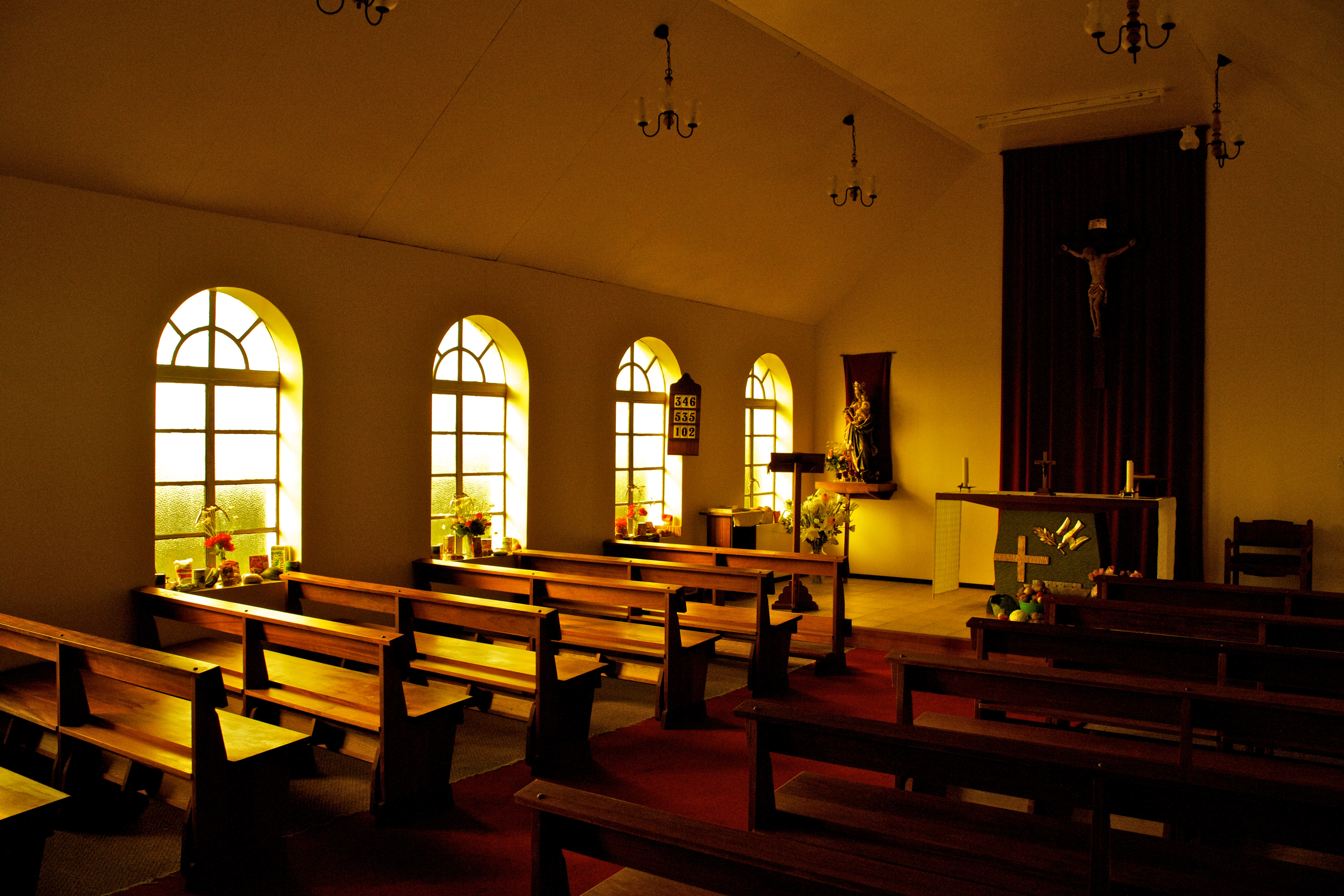
St Joseph's Catholic Church

There are eighty families on the island. Like many remote island communities, Tristan da Cunha has a shrinking, ageing population. In the past, Tristan da Cunha mothers had to travel to Cape Town to give birth, but since the opening of the Camogli Healthcare Centre in 2017 have been able to give birth on the island.

== Language ==
=== Phonetics and phonology ===
Tristan da Cunha English, also locally called Tristanian, is spoken on the island. It is the smallest and most isolated native-speaker community of English. It is a form of South Atlantic English, and shares similarities with Saint Helenian English, spoken on the island of St Helena. Tristanian has several notable unique phonetic and phonological characteristics, such as the following:

- The vowel in words like "face" is non-diphthongized, pronounced as [fe:s].
- Stops, such as the medial consonants in "button", "bottle", and "people", are glottalised.
- Extensive insertion of the sound [h] occurs in words like "happle" and "hafter", merging the pronunciation of "island" with "highland".
- Devoicing of the medial -z- and -zh- sounds is common, resulting in pronunciations like "sea[s]on" and "televi[sh]ion" with [s] and [sh] respectively.
- Tristan da Cunha English is non-rhotic, with linking and intrusive [r] sounds.

=== Grammar ===
Tristan da Cunha English shares non-standard grammatical features with other English varieties in the Falkland Islands and St Helena. Among its features:

- Plural marking after numbers is absent, as seen in constructions like "five pound".
- Distinct second person plural pronouns are used, such as "y'all" and "you's".
- Verbal inflectional morphology is simplified, as in "She sing real good" and "They never eat much them days."
- The pronoun "them" is used to mark definite noun phrases, as seen in sentences like "They never eat much them days."
- Expressiveness drives peculiarities in Tristan da Cunha English, including double comparatives (e.g., "I like that more better") and double negation (e.g., "nobody never come out or nothing").
- In questions, inversion is not used, as in constructions like "Where they is?"

== Education ==
Children leave school at age 16, and although they can take GCSEs, few do. The school on the island is St. Mary's School, which serves children from ages 4 to 16. The Naval Station had established a school building during World War II. The current facility opened in 1975 and has five classrooms, a kitchen, a stage, a computer room, and a craft and science room. Tristan students doing post-16 education receive assistance from the Tristan da Cunha Association Education Trust Fund and typically do so in the United Kingdom and South Africa.

The Tristan Song Project was a collaboration between St. Mary's School and amateur composers in Britain, led by music teacher Tony Triggs. It began in 2010 and involved St. Mary's pupils writing poems and Triggs providing musical settings by himself and his pupils. A desktop publication entitled Rockhopper Penguins and Other Songs (2010) embraced most of the songs completed that year and funded a consignment of guitars to the school. In February 2013, the Tristan Post Office issued a set of four Song Project stamps featuring island musical instruments and lyrics from Song Project songs about Tristan's volcano and wildlife. In 2014, the project broadened its scope and continues as the International Song Project.

== Religion ==
Approximately 80% of the population is Anglican, and 20% is Roman Catholic. The Roman Catholic population is served by the Mission sui iuris of Saint Helena, Ascension and Tristan da Cunha, which is administratively a part of the Apostolic Prefecture of the Falkland Islands. Edwin Dodgson, youngest brother of Lewis Carroll, spent several years as a missionary on the island in the nineteenth century.

== Health ==
Healthcare is funded by the government, undertaken at most times by one resident doctor. Surgery or facilities for complex childbirth are therefore limited, and emergencies can necessitate communicating with passing fishing vessels so the injured person can be ferried to Cape Town.

As of late 2007, IBM and Beacon Equity Partners, co-operating with Medweb, the University of Pittsburgh Medical Center, and the island's government on "Project Tristan", had supplied the island's doctor with access to long distance tele-medical help, making it possible to send ECG and X-ray pictures to doctors in other countries for instant consultation.

The Camogli Healthcare Centre, usually referred to as the hospital, was built and equipped in 2016–2017 to the latest UK National Health Service (NHS) standards and was officially opened on 7 June 2017. It is located in the southwestern corner of the settlement below the previous hospital (built in 1971), which is now used by the veterinarians, and for general storage. The new hospital was funded by the UK Department for International Development with the intention that the improved facilities would allow more procedures to be performed locally by visiting specialists, and therefore reduce the need for expensive referrals to Cape Town.

There are normally two expatriate doctors on the island, who provide 24-hour cover. There are also normally two expatriate and four local nurses, as well as two dental technicians, a hospital manager, and ancillary staff. The medical staff deal with day-to-day medical matters, handle emergency cases, and undertake minor surgery. More complex and serious cases are transported to Cape Town for treatment, as were all expectant mothers for their deliveries until the Camogli Healthcare Centre was completed in 2017 and new medical facilities enabled local mothers to give birth on the island. As of 2022, five babies had been born in the island's Camogli Healthcare Centre.

There are instances of health problems attributed to endogamy, including glaucoma. In addition, there is a very high (42%) incidence of asthma among the population, and research by Noe Zamel of the University of Toronto has led to discoveries about the genetic nature of the disease. Three of the original settlers of the island had asthma.

In 2026, British Army medics parachuted onto the territory to aid one resident who had contracted a suspected case of hantavirus.

== Culture ==
=== Music and traditional dance ===
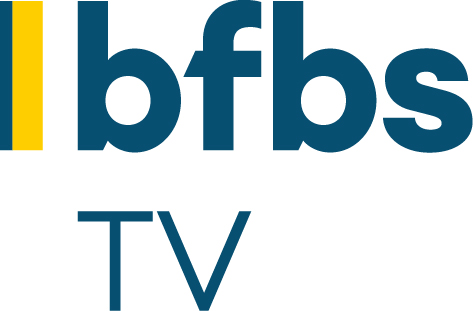
(BFBS TV) provides six TV channels: BBC One, BBC Two, ITV, Channel 4, Sky News and BFBS Extra, relayed to islanders via local transmitters.

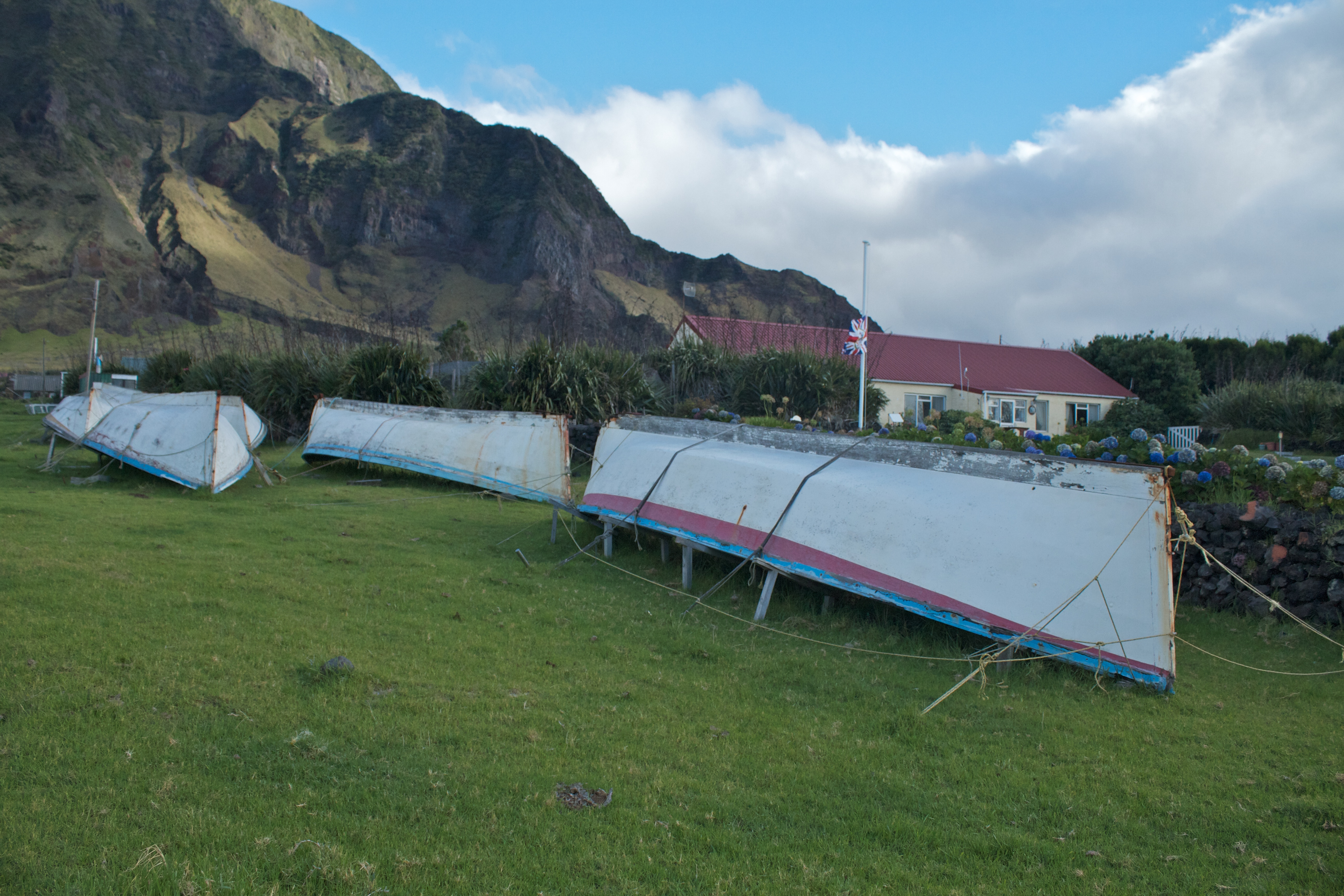
Longboats in front of the administrator's residence

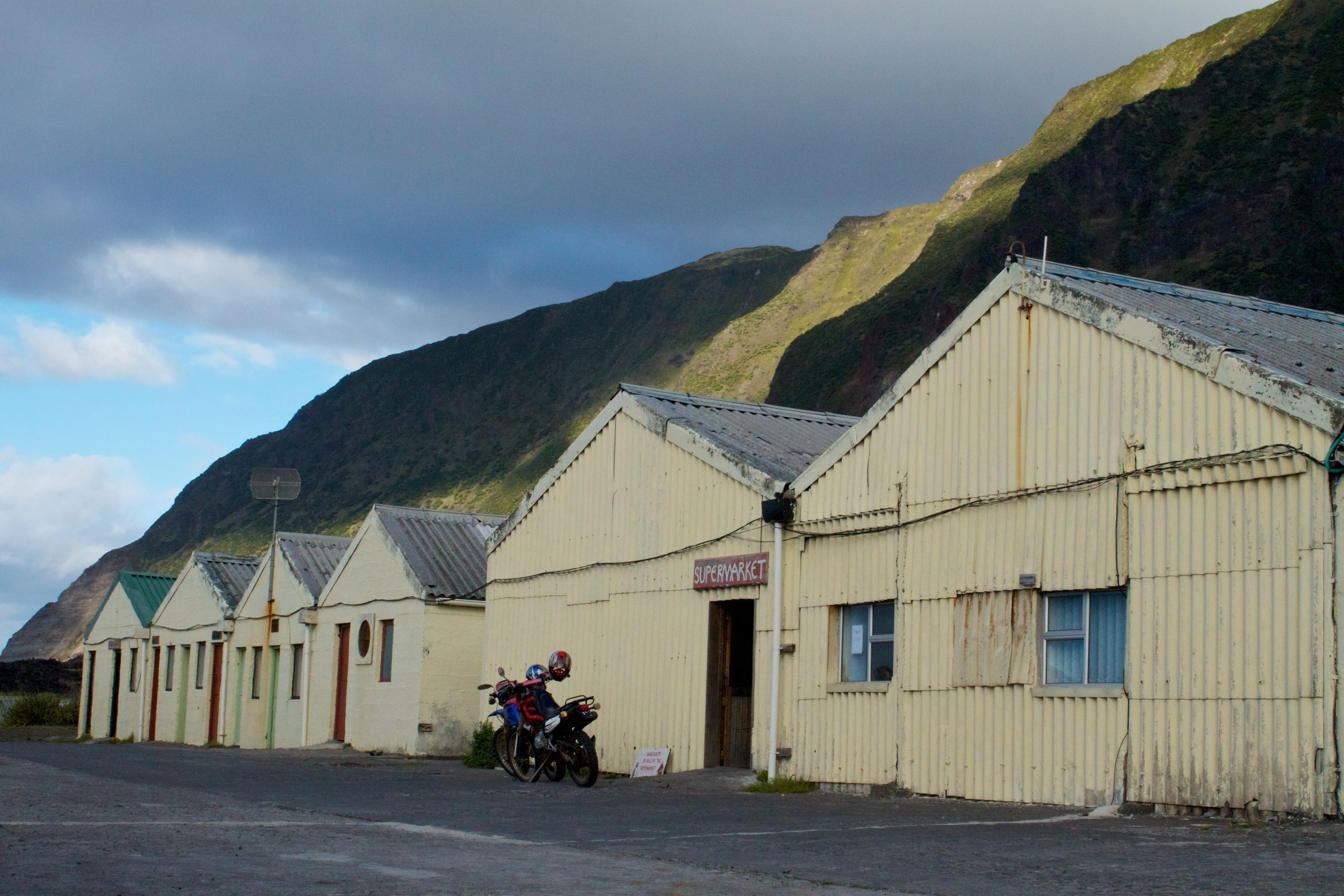
The supermarket provides the islands with all necessary goods.

Tristan residents Mary Swain and Percy Lavarello were recorded in 1962 whilst evacuated in Calshot, Hampshire, by Maud Karpeles and Peter Kennedy singing traditional songs and discussing the culture of the island, mainly music and dance; the full recording (split between seven tapes and also including other Tristan residents) can be heard on the British Library Sound Archive website. On these tapes, Mary Swain sings traditional English folk songs learnt from her mother, including seventeenth-century Child Ballads such as "Barbara Allen" and "The Golden Vanity". She also describes how dance was an important element of life on Tristan; well-known dances such as step dances, waltzes, polkas, mazurkas and schottisches were common, as well as many unique traditional dances such as "The Donkey Dance", "The Pillow Dance", "The Chair Dance" and something called "Tabby Oaker's Big Toe" which involved displaying one's feet. It seems that the music and dance of Tristan was ultimately derived from English traditions, but various peculiarities had developed.

=== Crime ===
Between 1988 and 2010, no one was arrested for crime by the single policeman on the island.

=== Radio and television ===
Local television began in 1984 using taped programming on Tuesday, Thursday and Sunday evenings. Live television arrived on the island in 2001, with the introduction of the British Forces Broadcasting Service (BFBS TV), which now provides six channels: BBC One, BBC Two, ITV, Channel 4, Sky News and BFBS Extra, relayed to islanders via local transmitters. Recently the service was upgraded to digital, most television screens are modern and DTV, while some older analogue CRT equipment is still in use with digital boxes connected, and there is at least one television set per house. BFBS Radio 2 is the locally available radio station.

=== Newspapers ===
The Tristan Times was an online newspaper for the island published from 2003 to 2019. The island government also posts news announcements on its website, which is maintained by the UK-based Tristan da Cunha Association.

=== Holidays and holiday traditions ===
The island holds an annual break from government and factory work, which begins before Christmas and lasts for three weeks. The beginning of the holiday, called Break-Up Day, is usually marked with parties and celebrations. The islanders would traditionally have parties on Boxing Day, but not on Christmas Day.

Traditionally, on "Old Year's Night" (meaning New Year's Eve), the islanders would conceal their identities with masks or blackface and the men would wear women's clothing; they were called "Okalolies" and would visit homes. Everyone would celebrate anonymously moving between households, singing songs, dancing, shouting, playing instruments and firing guns. At the stroke of midnight, a bell would announce the new year. On New Year's Day, the islanders would play cricket and football, and once again party later in the day. The disguises sometimes recall English Border Morris dancers.

=== Sport ===
Football, cricket, and baseball were all historically played on the island.

It has been reported that football was introduced to the locals in the 1920s by Rev. Henry Rogers, and it remains the island's favourite sport. Rose, Henry's wife, wrote about informal kick-abouts continuing for years, and these fast became a part of Tristanian culture. The islanders would split themselves into two teams and play friendly matches, especially on dates of special occasions, such as weddings, christenings etc.

In 1940, Tristan da Cunha's footballers played their first "international" game against the crew of a Norwegian ship. No record remains of the score. In the ensuing years, the game flourished, with the islanders playing matches against crews from vessels of various nationalities, including ships from the Royal Navy.

With live transmissions of televised football, the sport regained its former popularity. Tristan da Cunha FC was formed in 2002. A local fishing company bought them a kit (white shirts and blue shorts). They had a very basic pitch on American Field, named in recognition of the American forces stationed there during World War II. However, opponents were in short supply. It was a case of waiting for visiting opponents, and sometimes years might go by without any opportunities to play foreign opposition. Their first match was against a South African fishing vessel and they lost 10–6. The remoteness of Tristan da Cunha makes it virtually impossible for the team to travel abroad to play against foreign opposition. In recent times, the club's numbers have dropped to a level where only 5-a-side matches are being played.

== Notable people ==
- William Glass (1786–1853), Scottish Corporal and founder of the island's settlement.
- Edwin Heron Dodgson (1846–1918), a clergyman in the Church of England, was the youngest brother of Charles Lutwidge Dodgson (Lewis Carroll), author of Alice's Adventures in Wonderland. He is primarily remembered for his work as a missionary in the island of Tristan da Cunha from 1880 to 1884.
- Lewis Glass (1948–2019), former Chief Islander
- Anne Green (born 1952), first female Chief Islander and teacher.
- Conrad Jack Glass (born 1961) is a Tristanian police officer and a former Chief Islander. He is the first islander to have written a book about it, Rockhopper Copper (2005).
- James Glass (born 1961), multiple time Chief Islander.
- Ian Lavarello (born 1970), multiple time Chief Islander.

== See also ==
- Outline of Tristan da Cunha
- Sandy Point, Tristan da Cunha
