= Carex thouarsii =

Conservation status
- Least Concern (IUCN 3.1)

Scientific classification
- Kingdom: Plantae
- Clade: Tracheophytes
- Clade: Angiosperms
- Clade: Monocots
- Clade: Commelinids
- Order: Poales
- Family: Cyperaceae
- Genus: Carex
- Subgenus: Carex subg. Carex
- Section: Carex sect. Spirostachyae
- Species: C. thouarsii

Binomial name
- Carex thouarsii Carmich.

Species of grass-like plant

Carex thouarsii is a species of sedge found in the Tristan da Cunha archipelago. It lives chiefly in heaths dominated by Blechnum palmiforme, and Phylica arborea woodland. It is widespread and common on Tristan da Cunha and Inaccessible Island, but scarce on Nightingale Island, possibly due to a lack of habitat. It was first described by Dugald Carmichael in 1819 following the British annexation of Tristan da Cunha in 1816.
