= Atriplex plebeja =

Conservation status
- Critically Endangered (IUCN 3.1)

Scientific classification
- Kingdom: Plantae
- Clade: Tracheophytes
- Clade: Angiosperms
- Clade: Eudicots
- Order: Caryophyllales
- Family: Amaranthaceae
- Genus: Atriplex
- Species: A. plebeja

Binomial name
- Atriplex plebeja Carmich.

Species of flowering plant

Atriplex plebeja is a species of plant in the family Amaranthaceae. It is endemic to Tristan da Cunha, including Inaccessible and Nightingale Islands. Its natural habitat is rocky shores. It is threatened by habitat loss.
