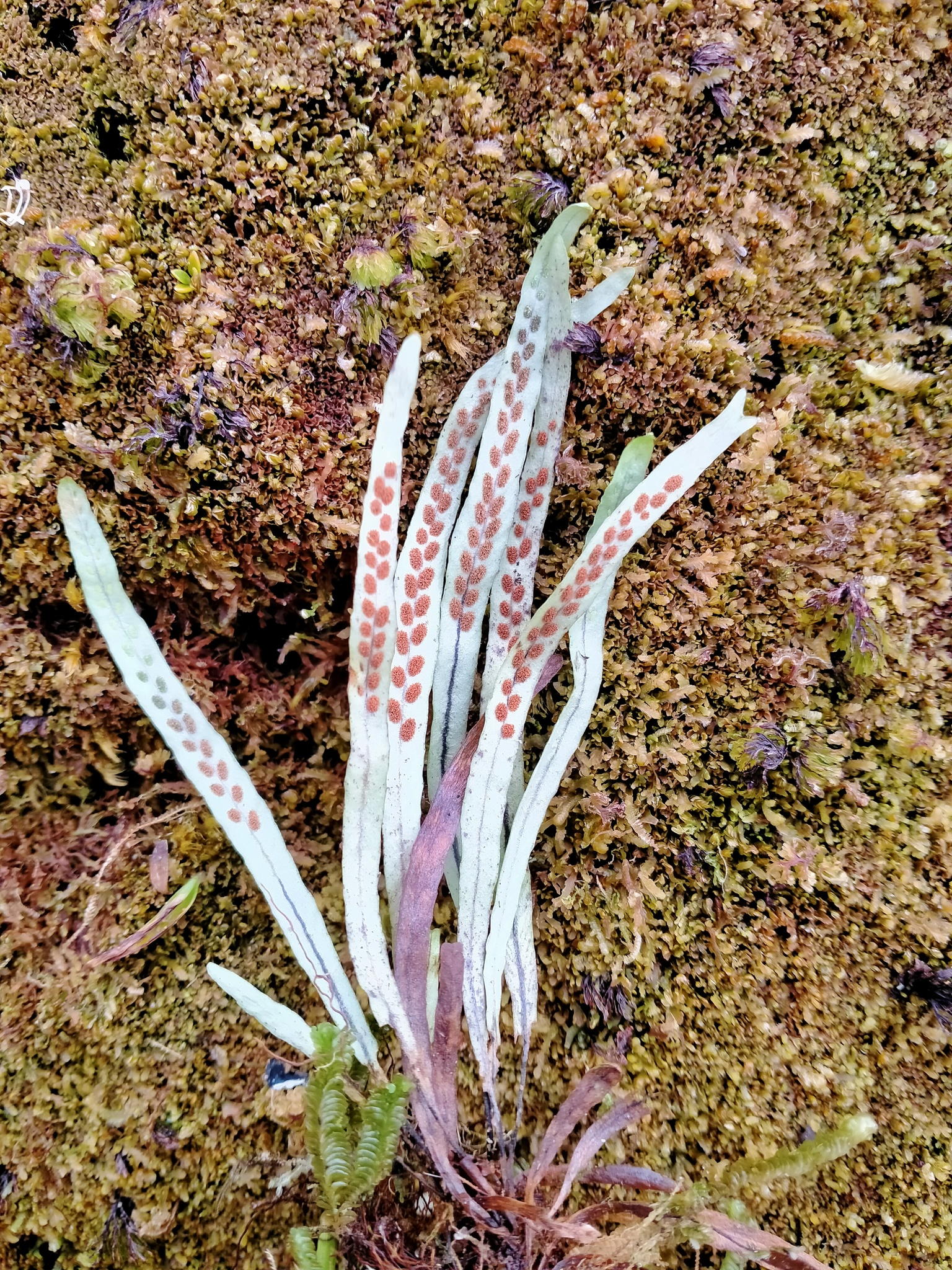
- Notogrammitis angustifolia in the Auckland Islands

Conservation status
- Not Threatened (NZ TCS)

Scientific classification
- Kingdom: Plantae
- Clade: Tracheophytes
- Division: Polypodiophyta
- Class: Polypodiopsida
- Order: Polypodiales
- Suborder: Polypodiineae
- Family: Polypodiaceae
- Genus: Notogrammitis
- Species: N. angustifolia

Binomial name
- Notogrammitis angustifolia (Jacq.) Parris

= Notogrammitis angustifolia =

Species of fern

Notogrammitis angustifolia is a species of fern. It is found in Chile, Argentina, Tristan da Cunha and Gough Island, South Africa, Australia, and New Zealand.

== Description ==
It can be distinguished by the usually erect to short-creeping rhizome, the narrow, linear, winged, glabrous fronds (<7 mm wide, up to 130mm in length), the lack of distinct stipes, the absence of hairs in the sori, and sori often being more or less parallel to the midrib. The sporangia are in groups on either side of the midrib.

The fronds are up to 130mm in length according to some sources, but less than 100mm according to others.

== Range and habitat ==
This species is found from sea level up to 1400m in New Zealand, and on the main islands as well as the outlying islands. It can be epiphytic, lithophytic, or found as a subalpine scrub.

== Ecology ==
This species is epiphytic on Dracophyllum in New Zealand, and Olearia in Tasmania. On Tristan da Cunha and Gough it is found on the stems of Bog Ferns and Island Trees.

== Etymology ==
Angustifolia means 'narrow-leaf' in scientific Latin.

== Taxonomy ==
The species was originally described by Nikolaus Joseph von Jacquin in 1786, based on a type specimen from the Straits of Magellan. This species was moved with some others out of Grammitis in 2012.
