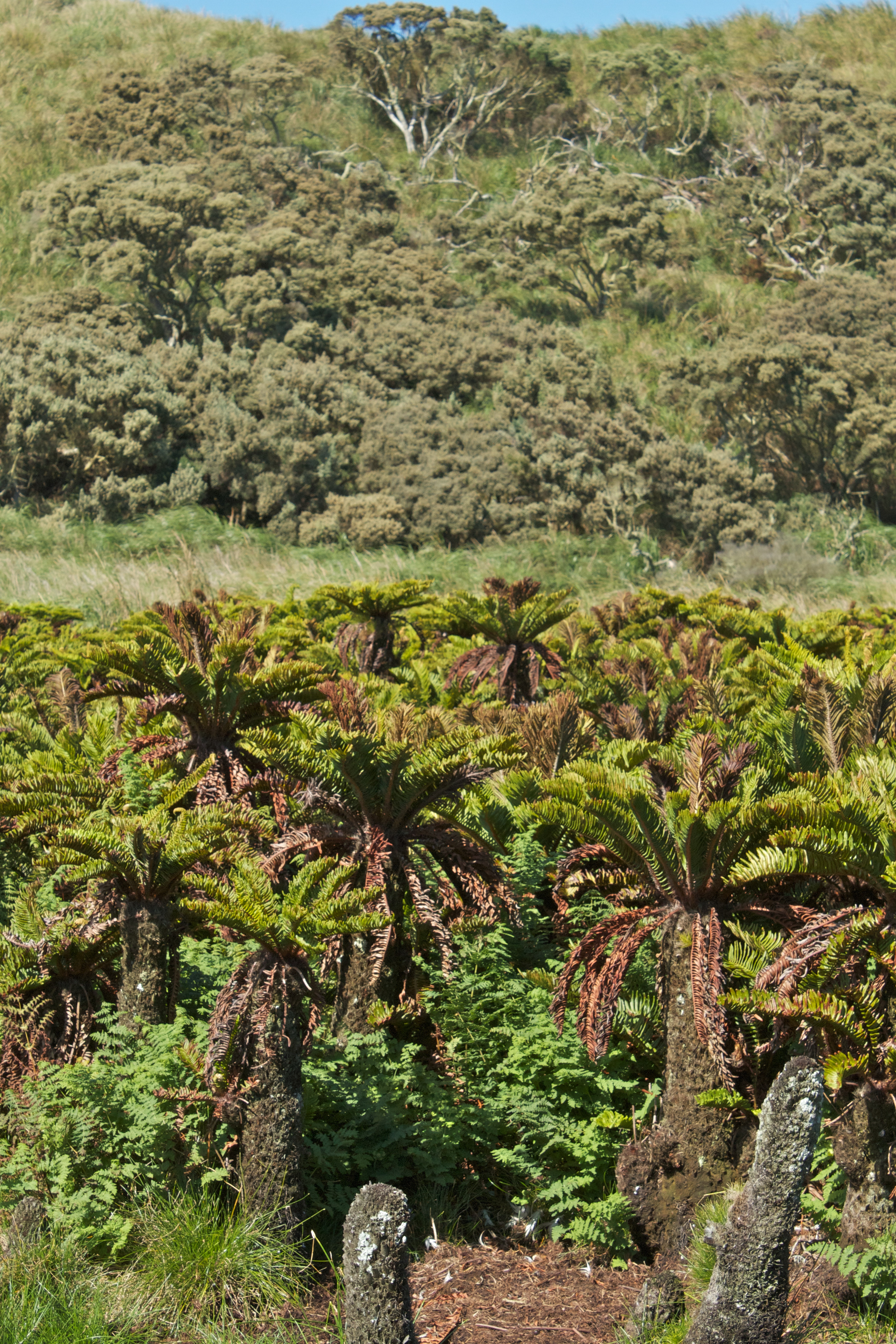
- Fernbush community on Nightingale Island dominated by Lomariocycas palmiformis

Scientific classification
- Kingdom: Plantae
- Clade: Tracheophytes
- Division: Polypodiophyta
- Class: Polypodiopsida
- Order: Polypodiales
- Suborder: Aspleniineae
- Family: Blechnaceae
- Genus: Lomariocycas
- Species: L. palmiformis

Binomial name
- Lomariocycas palmiformis (Thouars) Gasper & A.R.Sm.

Synonyms
- Blechnum palmiforme (Thouars) C.Chr.; Lomaria robusta Carmich.; Pteris palmiformis Thouars; Lomaria palmiformis (Thouars) Desv.

= Lomariocycas palmiformis =

Species of fern

Lomariocycas palmiformis, synonym Blechnum palmiforme, is a species of fern in the family Blechnaceae. It is endemic to the Tristan da Cunha group of islands. The species is a tree fern that can grow to 2 m in some sheltered areas. It resembles the form of a palm tree, but is not part of Arecaceae, the palm family.
