= Dugald Carmichael =

Scottish botanist (1772–1827)

- Born: 1772; Stronacraoibh, Lismore Island
- Died: 1827 (aged 54–55); Appin
- Scientific career
- Fields: Botany

Dugald Carmichael (born 1772 in Stronacraoibh, Lismore Island, died 1827 in Appin) was a Scottish botanist and officer in the 72nd Highlanders. He is known as the "Father of Marine Botany". The plant genus Carmichaelia is named after him.

He was a friend of Sir William Hooker.

== Taxon described by him ==
- See Category:Taxa named by Dugald Carmichael
