= History of Tristan da Cunha =

Tristan da Cunha is part of the British overseas territory of Saint Helena, Ascension and Tristan da Cunha and has a history going back to the beginning of the 16th century. It was settled by men from military garrisons and ships, who married native women from Saint Helena and the Cape Colony. Its people are multi-racial, descended from European male founders and mixed-race (African, Asian and European) and African women founders.

== Discovery ==
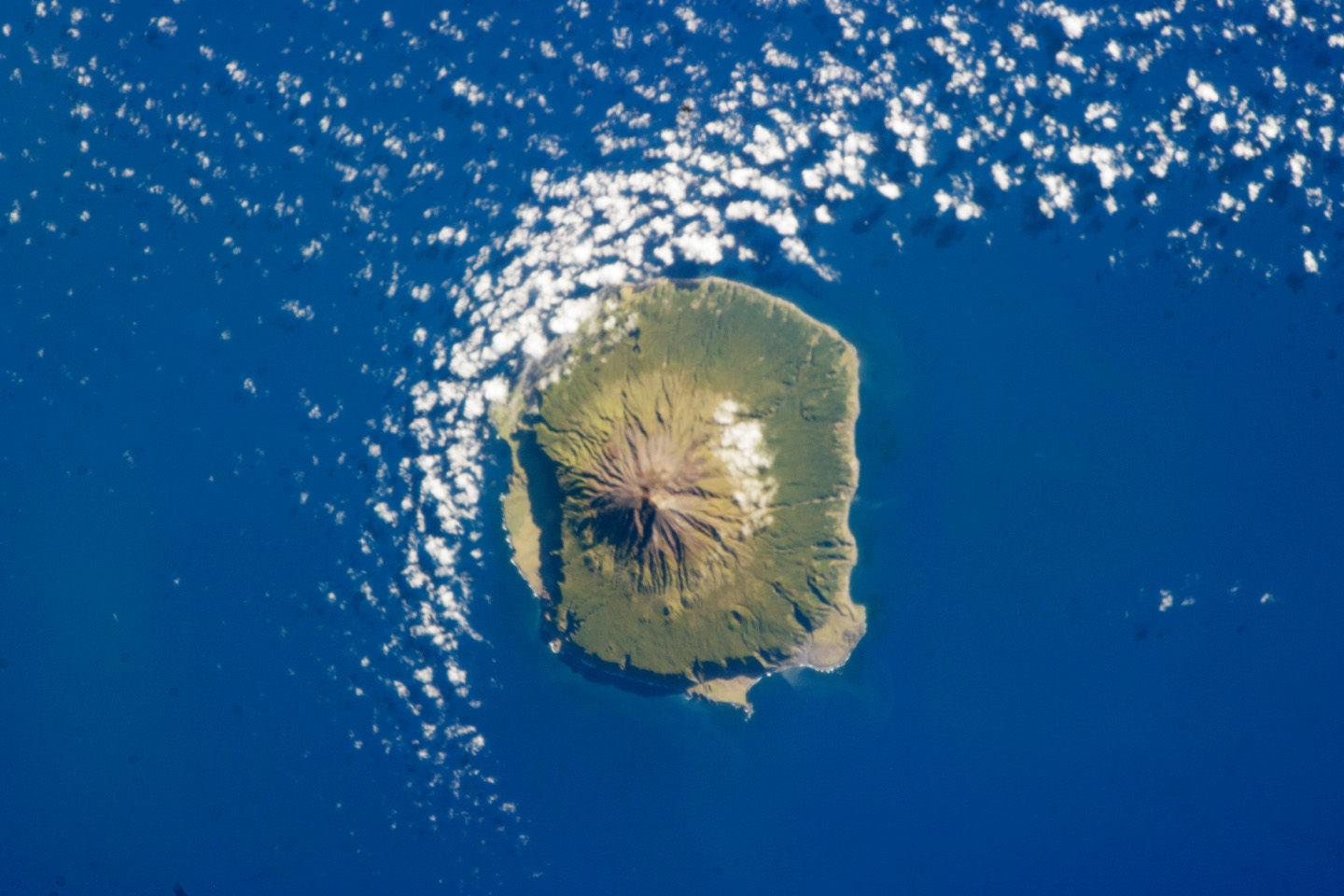
Tristan da Cunha in February 2013, as seen from the International Space Station

The uninhabited islands of Tristan da Cunha were first sighted in May 1506 during a voyage to India by the Portuguese admiral Tristão da Cunha, although rough seas prevented a landing. He named the main island after himself, Ilha de Tristão da Cunha, which was later anglicised to Tristan da Cunha Island. His discovery appeared on nautical maps from 1509 and on Mercator's world map of 1541. Some sources state that the Portuguese made the first landing on Tristan in 1520, when the Lás Rafael captained by Ruy Vaz Pereira called for water.

== 17th century ==
Though far west of the Cape of Good Hope, the islands were on the preferred route from Europe to the Indian Ocean in the 17th century; ships first crossed the Atlantic to Brazil on the Northeasterly Trades, followed the Brazil Current south to pass the Doldrums, and then picked up the Westerlies to cross the Atlantic again, where they could encounter Tristan da Cunha. The Dutch East India Company required their ships to follow this route, and on 17 February 1643 the crew of the Heemstede, captained by Claes Gerritszoon Bierenbroodspot, made the first confirmed landing. The Heemstede replenished their supplies with fresh water, fish, seals and penguins and left a wooden tablet with the inscription "Today, 17 February 1643, from the Dutch fluyt Heemstede, Claes Gerritsz Bierenbroodspot from Hoorn and Jan Coertsen van den Broec landed here.".

Thereafter, the Dutch East India Company returned to the area four more times to explore whether the islands could function as a supply base for their ships. The first stop was on 5 September 1646 on a voyage to Batavia, Dutch East Indies, and the second was an expedition by the galliot Nachtglas (Nightglass), which left from Cape Town on 22 November 1655. The crew of the Nachtglas noticed the tablet left by the Heemstede on 10 January 1656 near a watering place. They left a wooden tablet themselves as well, as they also did on Nachtglas Eijland (now Inaccessible Island). The Nachtglas, commanded by Jan Jacobszoon van Amsterdam, examined Tristan da Cunha and Gough Island and made rough charts for the Dutch East India Company. Dutch sailors also stayed on the island for four weeks in 1658, and made their last stop in April 1669, when their idea of utilizing the islands as a supply base was abandoned, probably due to the absence of a safe harbour.

In the 17th century ships were also sent from Saint Helena by the English East India Company to Tristan to report on a proposed settlement there, but that project also came to nothing.

== 18th century ==
The first survey of the archipelago was made by the French corvette Heure du Berger in 1767. Soundings were taken and a rough survey of the coastline was made. The presence of water at the large waterfall of Big Watron and in a lake on the north coast was noted, and the results of the survey were published by a Royal Navy hydrographer in 1781.

A British naval officer who visited the group in 1760 gave his name to Nightingale Island. John Patten, the master of an English merchant ship, and part of his crew lived on Tristan from August 1790 to April 1791, during which time they captured 3600 seals.

The first known attempt to climb Queen Mary's Peak was in 1793 by the French naturalist Louis-Marie Aubert du Petit-Thouars, but this was without success. He did collect and catalogue hundreds of plants from this expedition.

== 19th century ==
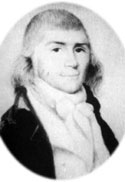
Jonathan Lambert

During this time American whalers frequented the neighboring waters, and in December 1810 an American named Jonathan Lambert "late of Salem, mariner and citizen thereof," along with an Italian named Thomas Currie (anglicized version) and another named Williams, made Tristan their home, establishing the first permanent settlement on the island. Lambert declared himself sovereign and sole possessor of the group (which he renamed Islands of Refreshment) "grounding my right and claim on the rational and sure ground of absolute occupancy". Lambert's sovereignty was short lived, as he and Williams were drowned while out fishing in May 1812. Currie was joined, however, by two other men and they began to cultivate vegetables, wheat and oats, and breed pigs.

War having broken out in 1812 between the United States and the United Kingdom, the islands were largely used as a base by American cruisers sent to prey on British merchant ships. This and other considerations urged by Lord Charles Somerset, then governor of Cape Colony, led the British government to authorize taking "possession" of the islands as dependencies of the Cape. The formal proclamation of annexation was made on 14 August 1816. The British wanted to ensure that the French, their repeated enemies, would not be able to use the islands as a base for a rescue operation to free Napoleon Bonaparte from his prison on Saint Helena. Attempts to colonize Inaccessible Island failed.

The islands were occupied by a garrison of British Marines, and a civilian population was gradually built up. Whalers also set up on the islands as a base for operations in the Southern Atlantic.

In January 1817 the first successful climb was made to the peak of Queen Mary's Peak.

A small garrison was maintained on Tristan until November 1817. At their own request William Glass (d. 1853), a Scottish corporal from Kelso in the Royal Artillery, was left behind with his wife, two children, and two masons. Thus began the present settlement. From time to time additional settlers arrived or shipwrecked mariners decided to remain. In 1827 they persuaded five coloured women (these were of mixed race: African, Asian and European) from Saint Helena to migrate to Tristan to become the wives of the five desperate bachelors then on the island. Later, African women from Cape Colony married residents on the island. Other male settlers were of Dutch and Italian origin. As a consequence of this history, the inhabitants are of mixed race. DNA studies have shown that the founding men were primarily of European ancestry.

Glass ruled over the little community from 1817 to 1853 in patriarchal fashion. Besides raising crops, the settlers possessed numbers of cattle, sheep and pigs. Their most lucrative occupation was seal-fishing. The island was still frequented by American whalers. In 1856, 25 people emigrated to the United States, out of a total island population of about 100. The next year 45 of the inhabitants removed to Cape Colony. Since then other younger or more restless members of the community have emigrated there; some took to a seafaring life.

The inhabitants settled on the plain on the north-west of Tristan, as it was the only level land. Here a number of substantial stone cottages and a church were built.

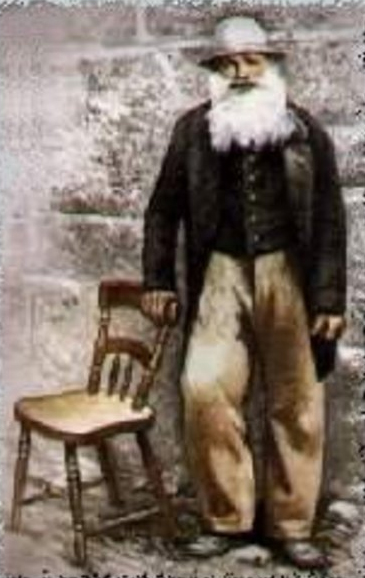
Pieter Willemszoon Groen (1808–1902), known as Peter William Green, was the "uncrowned king of Tristan da Cunha"

After the death of Glass, the head of the community for some time was a man named Cotton, who had served on a man of war ship, and for three years had been guard over Napoleon at Saint Helena. Cotton was succeeded by Peter William Green (anglicised from Pieter Willemszoon Groen), a native of Katwijk aan Zee, who had settled in the island in 1836. During Green's "reign," the economic condition of Tristan suffered by the loss of ship traffic of the whalers. This was largely due to the outbreak of the American Civil War diverting resources. In addition, the Confederate cruisers CSS Alabama and CSS Shenandoah, captured and burned many Union whaling ships. As a result, the number of ships calling at Tristan considerably diminished and trade languished.

With the opening of the Suez Canal in 1869, together with the gradual transition from sailing ships to coal-fired steam ships, the isolation of the islands increased. They were no longer needed as a stopping port for sailing journeys from Europe to the Far East. Most ships went through the canal for a shorter route.

In 1867, Prince Alfred, Duke of Edinburgh and second son of Queen Victoria, visited the islands. The main settlement, Edinburgh of the Seven Seas, was named in honour of his visit.

In October 1873 the islands were carefully surveyed by the celebrated expedition of HMS Challenger. Captain George Nares recorded that upon the ship's arrival, the men of Tristan came forward offering potatoes, albatross eggs, and other provisions to his crew. The Captain recorded a total of 15 families and 86 individuals living on the island. This expedition also aided two German brothers named Stoltenhoff, in moving to the mainland at Cape Town. They had been living on Inaccessible Island since November 1871. They were the only ones to have attempted colonization of any island except the main one.

In 1880 the population appears to have attained its maximum. In 1885 the islanders encountered disaster. A poor winter had left them short of food, and a boat sent to barter with a ship offshore was lost with all hands—fifteen men. Only four adult males were left on the island. At the same time a plague of rats—survivors of a shipwrecked vessel—wrought much havoc among the crops. The British government planned to remove all the inhabitants to the Cape, but the majority preferred to remain. Stores and provisions were sent out to them by the British government.

The ravages of the rats rendered the growing of wheat impossible; the wealth of the islanders now consisted of their cattle, sheep, potatoes, and apple and peach trees, and the only form of currency was the potato. The population in 1897 was only 64; in 1901 it was 74, and in 1909, 95.

Tristan da Cunha's residents managed their own affairs without any written laws. The inhabitants have been described as moral, religious, hospitable to strangers, well-mannered and industrious, healthy and long-lived. They lack intoxicating liquors and were said to commit no crimes. As of 2003, there have been no divorces. They were daring sailors, and in small canvas boats of their own building voyage to Nightingale and Inaccessible islands. They knit garments from the wool of their sheep, are good carpenters, and make serviceable carts.

The Society for the Propagation of the Gospel recruited the first missionary to the island, Rev. William F. Taylor, who served from 1851 to 1856. After his departure, the Bishop of St. Helena attempted to establish an Anglican mission on the island from 1866 onward, and this post was finally filled by Lewis Carroll's youngest brother, the Reverend Edwin Heron Dodgson, who arrived on the island 25 February 1881. Shortly after his arrival he recorded 16 families and 107 individuals living on the island. Reverend Dodgson returned to England in February 1885 and attempted to arrange for the evacuation of the Tristan, meeting with Prime Minister, Lord Salisbury, citing dangerous isolation, but the evacuation was deemed impracticable. Following a disaster at sea that killed fifteen islanders, a large proportion of the working men, Dodgson returned to Tristan in 1886 and remained until December 1889.

== 20th century ==
In 1906 the islanders passed through a period of distress owing to great mortality among the cattle and the almost total failure of the potato crop. The majority again refused, however, to desert the island, though offered allotments of land in Cape Colony. Similar proposals were made and declined several times since the question was first mooted in 1886.

A series of Anglican missionaries served the island parish: Rev. J. G. Barrow and his wife Katherine (1906–1909), Rev. H. M. Rogers and his wife Rose Annie (1922–1925), Rev. R. A. C. Pooley (1927–1929), Rev. A. G. Partridge (1929–1932), Rev. Harold Wilde (1934–1940).

In the early 20th century, the Tristan da Cunha community, particularly around 1906–1908, survived extreme isolation through self-sufficiency. Utilising longboats developed by Gaetano Lavarello for hunting/gathering on Inaccessible Island, they overcame a 1906 cattle crisis and poor potato crops to avoid starvation, while Rev. Barrow provided ministry and the Glass brothers established local Roman Catholic roots. Following tough times, the community strengthened their resilience by travelling to neighbouring Inaccessible Island for resources. Italian shipwreck survivor Gaetano Lavarello provided essential carpentry skills for building longboats, which were vital for gathering albatrosses, shearwaters, and penguins for food. In 1906, unusually dry weather led to poor potato crops, and an estimated 400 head of cattle were lost, but the community did not starve. Rev. and Mrs Barrow provided ministry, landing at "Down-Where-The-Minister-Landed-His-Things," where they brought a harmonium. In 1908, the return of two Glass brothers and their marriage to Irish sisters Elizabeth and Agnes Smith brought significant influence to teaching and the Roman Catholic faith on the island.

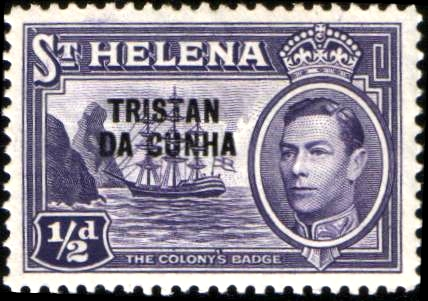
A 1938 stamp of Saint Helena overprinted for use in Tristan da Cunha from 1952 (when Elizabeth II not George VI was monarch)

On 12 January 1938, by Letters Patent, the islands were declared a dependency of Saint Helena. Before this, passing ships stopped irregularly at the island for a period of mere hours.

During World War II, the islands were used as a top secret Royal Navy weather and radio station codenamed HMS Atlantic Isle, to monitor U Boats (which needed to surface to maintain radio contact) and German shipping movements in the South Atlantic Ocean. The only currency in use on the island at this time was the potato, and islanders labouring to construct the station were paid in kind with naval supplies for their own use, such as wood, paint and tea. Money was introduced the following year, as was the island's first newspaper, The Tristan Times. The first Administrator, Surgeon Lieutenant Commander E.J.S. Woolley, was appointed by the British government during this time.

The second Duke of Edinburgh, the husband of Queen Elizabeth II, visited the islands in 1957 as part of a world tour on board the royal yacht Britannia.

In 1958 as part of an experiment, Operation Argus, the United States Navy detonated an atomic bomb 160 kilometres (100 mi) high in the upper atmosphere about 175 kilometres (109 mi) southeast of the main island.

The 1961 eruption of Queen Mary's Peak forced the evacuation of the entire population via Cape Town to wooden huts in the disused Pendell Army Camp in Merstham, Surrey, England, before moving to a more permanent site at a former Royal Air Force station in Calshot near Southampton, England, living mainly in a road called Tristan Close. In 1962, a Royal Society expedition went to the islands to assess the damage, and reported that the settlement Edinburgh of the Seven Seas had been only marginally affected. Most families returned in 1963 led by Willie Repetto (head of the ten-person island council) and Allan Crawford (the former island welfare officer).

== 21st century ==
On 23 May 2001, the islands experienced an extratropical cyclone that generated winds up to 193 kilometres per hour (120 mph). Several structures were severely damaged and a large number of cattle were killed, prompting emergency aid from the British government.

In 2005, the islands were given a United Kingdom post code (TDCU 1ZZ) to make it easier for the residents to order goods online.

The St Helena, Ascension and Tristan da Cunha Constitution Order 2009 was made by Her Majesty the Queen and the Privy Council on 8 July and came into operation on 1 September 2009. The new Constitution replaced the 1988 version and among other changes limited the Governor's powers, included a Bill of Rights, established independence of the judiciary and the public service and formally designated the Governor of St Helena as, concurrently, the Governor for Ascension and Tristan da Cunha. It also ended the "dependency" status of Ascension and Tristan da Cunha on St Helena.

On 4 December 2007 an outbreak of an acute virus-induced flu was reported. This outbreak was compounded by Tristan's lack of suitable and sufficient medical supplies. The British coastguard in Falmouth co-ordinated international efforts to get appropriate medicines to Tristan to treat the virus. Tristan's elderly population and the very young were most at risk; however, only four elderly people were hospitalised. Royal Fleet Auxiliary Vessel RFA Gold Rover upon reaching the island with the required medical supplies found no emergency and the islanders were in good general health.

On 13 February 2008, fire destroyed the fishing factory and the four generators that supplied power to the island. Backup generators were used to power the hospital and give power for part of the day to the rest of the island. Power was on during the day and early evening and candlelight was used the rest of the time. On 14 March 2008, new generators were installed and uninterrupted power was restored. This fire was devastating to the island because fishing is a mainstay of the economy. Royal Engineers from the British Army worked on the harbour to help maintain it, as everything comes and goes by sea. This was supported by a LSDA vessel Lyme Bay from the Royal Fleet Auxiliary. The concrete topping put in place has subsequently been badly damaged and ongoing repairs will be required to keep the harbour from breaking apart in winter storms.

On 16 March 2011, the Maltese-registered freighter MS Oliva ran aground on Nightingale Island, spilling tons of heavy fuel oil into the ocean. The crew were rescued, but the ship broke up, leaving an oil slick that surrounded the island, threatening its population of rockhopper penguins. Nightingale Island has no fresh water, so the penguins were transported to Tristan da Cunha for cleaning. The Greek captain and his 21 Filipino crew stayed in Edinburgh of the Seven Seas and assisted the islanders in their work.

In November 2011 the Volvo Ocean Race boat Puma's Mar Mostro headed to the island after the mast came down to meet a supporting vessel in the first leg between Alicante (Spain) and Cape Town (South Africa). This event put the archipelago in the world press that were reporting the race, making it known to a larger public.

Tristan da Cunha recorded zero community cases of COVID-19. On 16 March 2020, the local Island Council enacted a total ban on all outside visitors. Because the island has no airport and relies on a six-day boat journey from South Africa, managing entry points was simple. While the rest of the world locked down, daily life in the lone settlement of Edinburgh of the Seven Seas continued as usual, without masks, social distancing, or closures. The island’s isolation posed a unique challenge for vaccine delivery. In April 2021, the UK Royal Navy vessel HMS Forth completed a complex multi-leg military relay from Oxfordshire via the Falkland Islands. It successfully delivered enough Oxford-AstraZeneca doses to fully vaccinate the entire adult population within days of arrival. The territory’s strict defences faced only one major test. In July 2021, two crew members tested positive aboard the visiting offshore fishing vessel MFV Edinburgh. The local government immediately turned the ship back to Cape Town and placed the island into a strict 10-day precautionary lockdown. The virus never breached the shore. On 2 March 2023, following a comprehensive booster campaign, the Island Council officially lifted all remaining travel restrictions and vaccine requirements. Today, the territory remains entirely COVID-free, standing as a unique historical example of a perfect geographic quarantine.

From 13-15 April 2026, the islands were visited by an expedition and cruise ship, the MV Hondius, during which passengers and crew from the ship disembarked. Later, it emerged that several passengers on the cruise ship had been infected with the hantavirus, before arriving on Tristan. In early May, one individual who had disembarked at Tristan and remained on the island was diagnosed with hantavirus.

On 9 May 2026, a specialist UK military team executed a historic emergency mission, parachuting onto Tristan da Cunha with medical assistance for the suspected hantavirus case. The team comprised six paratroopers from the British Army Pathfinder Platoon of the 16 Air Assault Brigade, one specialist doctor and one military intensive care nurse. Due to the critical care required, an intensive care doctor and an intensive care nurse were strapped to paratroopers for tandem jumps. The nurse had done a civilian tandem jump before, but for the doctor, it was their first time. An RAF A400M transport aircraft flew the team 6,788 km from RAF Brize Norton to Ascension Island, before flying another 3,000 km south, sustained by mid-air refuelling from an RAF Voyager tanker. Arriving at the drop zone 5 km northeast of the island, the team jumped from 2500 m so the winds exceeding 50 ln/h would blow them over land. A local police RIB patrolled below as a safety precaution. The operation was completed in two phases. The first group of four paratroopers landed near the "Back Fence" and set up radio guidance at "The Patches". The second group, two paratroopers and the two clinicians, landed safely via tandem parachutes onto the island’s 9-hole golf course. Once the personnel were on the ground, the A400M air-dropped 3.3 tonnes of vital medical cargo and oxygen cylinders across three subsequent runs, successfully stabilising the island's healthcare emergency before returning to Ascension.

HMS Medway was dispatched from her post in the Falkland Islands on 14 May 2026. She sailed for seven days through notoriously rough waters to reach Tristan da Cunha. HMS Medway arrived off the coast at Calshot Harbour on 22 May. Her primary objectives are to deliver six fresh civilian clinicians and heavy medical provisions to ensure long-term healthcare resilience on the island and extract the paratroopers and military medics who have been stationed on the island for two weeks. Four of the arriving medics were from the UK and two from the Falkland Islands. On 24 May, sea conditions allowed them to get the civilian medics and one crew member off first, and then the military medics and paratroopers boarded the ship using a Tristan Fisheries RIB, although some of the paratroopers' kit remained on the island and will be shipped at a later date. HMS Medway then set sail for the Falklands.
