= Conrad Glass =

Chief Islander of Tristan da Cunha (2007-2010), Tristan da Cunha's only police officer

Conrad Glass MBE
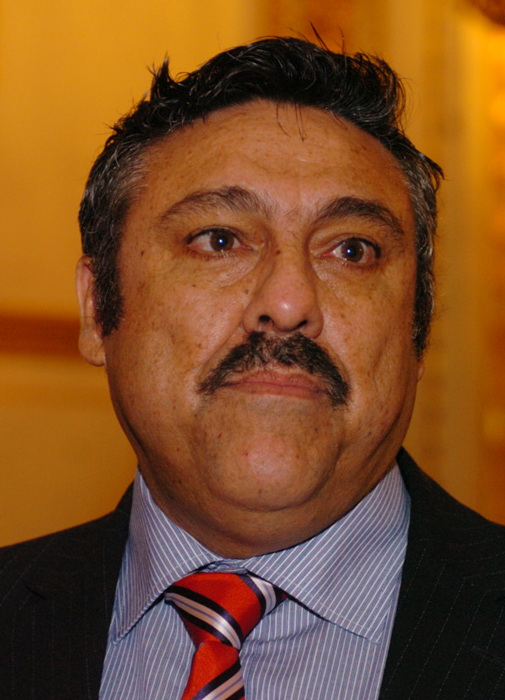
- Glass in 2009

Chief Islander of Tristan da Cunha
- In office 22 March 2007 – 12 April 2010
- Administrator: David John Morley
- Preceded by: Anne Violet Green
- Succeeded by: Ian Lavarello

Personal details
- Born: Conrad Jack Glass; 20 January 1961 (age 65) Edinburgh of the Seven Seas, Tristan da Cunha
- Occupation: Inspector, civil servant
- Department: Saint Helena Police Service
- Service years: 1986–present
- Notable work: Rockhopper Copper (2005)
- Awards: Member of the Order of the British Empire (2010)

Conrad Jack Glass MBE (born 20 January 1961) is a Tristanian police inspector and civil servant who was Tristan da Cunha's former Chief Islander from 2007 to 2010. Glass is the first islander to have written a book about the island, authoring Rockhopper Copper in 2005.

== Early life ==
Glass was born in Edinburgh of the Seven Seas, Tristan da Cunha on 20 January 1961 to Noel Edwin (Spike) and Monica Rose Glass (Rogers). When Queen Mary's Peak erupted later that year, he and his family were evacuated to the United Kingdom. His family stayed in Calshot, Hampshire, for two years before returning to the South Atlantic island.

Glass began his schooling in World War II-era navy huts on Tristan at the age of five, and in 1974, continued to study at the island's new school. He left school at the age of 15, but took further studies a year later so he could pass British exams.

== Career ==
After completing his schooling, Glass worked at the island's fish factory for eight years. In 1985, having decided that future prospects in the fishing industry were dismal, Glass gained employment with the island's government in its supermarket warehouse. After a year working in the warehouse, Glass left Tristan with his family for Saint Helena, where he trained with the Saint Helena Police Service.

One year later, Glass returned to his island home and started working as a storekeeper and tool clerk. Concurrent to that employment, Glass began to work part-time for the police service. Upon the retirement of Albert Glass, he assumed command of the police department on Tristan da Cunha. In 1992, Glass went to Britain for training with the Hertfordshire Constabulary. Upon his return to Tristan, he was promoted to the rank of sergeant. He was promoted again in 1998, to inspector.

Glass became the first Tristanian to write a book on island life, its history and legends, when Rockhopper Copper was published in 2005. In 2007, Glass stood in elections for the position of Chief Islander in the Tristan da Cunha Island Council; which he won, serving three years until 2010. In June 2010, Glass became a Member of the Order of the British Empire in honour of his years of dedicated service to the Tristanian community.

Glass continued as the island's only police officer. In 2010, he told The Guardian that in his then-22 years of service on the almost crime-free island, he had not had to use its sole holding cell since he took on the job. Glass also said that as his retirement approaches, no one has appeared to want to take over his position. Two special constables show no interest in doing so. As of 2021, he is still the island's only police officer.

== Family ==
Glass’ father Noel Edwin (Spike) Glass was born on 7 December 1928. He was the eldest of five children born to George Allen Glass. He died at the Camogli Hospital on 27 May 2015.

The family is directly related to the founder of Tristan, William Glass, a native of Scotland. William’s son Thomas Jordan Glass perished during the 1885 lifeboat disaster. Thomas’ son Robert Franklin Glass was the father of George Allen Glass. His cousins include fellow Chief Islanders James Glass, Lewis Glass and Anne Green.

Glass' son, Leon Glass, is the founder and player-manager of the island's only football team Tristan da Cunha FC.

== Publications ==
- Rockhopper Copper: the life and times of the people of the most remote inhabited island on Earth. Leominster: Orphans Press. 2005. ISBN 9781903360101.
