= Albert Glass =

Tristanian politician (1935–2007)

Albert Glass (25 January 1935 – 18 August 2007) was a Tristanian politician who served as Tristan da Cunha's second chief islander from 1973 to 1979 and 1982 to 1985.

In 1967, after attending Hendon Police College in London, Glass became the island's first police officer.

== Family ==
Glass was born on 25 January 1935 to Frank Glass and Clara "Mary" (née Swain). His father was the son of Robert Franklin Glass, son of Thomas Jordan Glass, a casualty of the 1885 Tristan da Cunha lifeboat disaster, and son of the island's founder William Glass.

Glass is the cousin of former chief islanders Conrad Glass, Lewis Glass, James Glass and Anne Green.
