= 2025 Tristan da Cunha general election =

British Overseas Territory election

General elections were held in Tristan da Cunha on 5 March 2025 to elect eight members of the Island Council and the Chief Islander.

== Electoral system ==
The 12-member Island Council consists of the Administrator as President, three appointed members and eight elected members, who are elected by plurality-at-large voting. At least one elected member of the council must be a woman. If there are no women among the eight candidates that receive the most votes, only the top seven male candidates are declared elected, alongside the woman that received the highest number of votes. If there are no female candidates, a by-election is held for the eighth seat, in which only female candidates can stand.

The Chief Islander is elected on a separate ballot by first-past-the-post voting, and must also be elected to the Island Council to be eligible to become Chief Islander.

== Results ==
=== Chief Islander ===
Candidate	Votes	%
Ian Lavarello	91	56.17
James Glass	43	26.54
Lorraine Repetto	28	17.28
Total	162	100.00
Valid votes	162	97.59
Invalid/blank votes	4	2.41
Total votes	166	100.00
Registered voters/turnout	200	83.00
Source: Tristan da Cunha Government News

=== Island Council ===
Candidate	Votes	%
Simon Glass	96	59.26
Ian Lavarello	92	56.79
Larry Swain	85	52.47
Iris Green	78	48.15
Rodney Green	74	45.68
Steve Swain	71	43.83
Lorraine Repetto	69	42.59
Randall Repetto	66	40.74
James Glass	55	33.95
Vera Glass	48	29.63
Warren Glass	44	27.16
Lynette Green	39	24.07
Rhyanna Swain	37	22.84
Leon Glass	24	14.81
Beverley Swain	23	14.20
Conrad Glass	22	13.58
Conchita Repetto	22	13.58
Total	945	100.00
Valid votes	162	97.59
Invalid/blank votes	4	2.41
Total votes	166	100.00
Registered voters/turnout	200	83.00
Source: Tristan da Cunha Government News
