= Lewis Glass =

Tristanian politician (1948-2019)

Lewis Edward Glass MBE (6 April 1948 – 19 February 2019) was a Tristanian politician who served as Tristan da Cunha's Chief Islander (1991–1994)

He was awarded a Member of the Order of the British Empire in 1995, Colonial Special Constabulary Medal in 2010 and both the Queen's Golden Jubilee and Queen's Diamond Jubilee Medals.

== Family ==
Glass was born on 6 April 1948 to Godfrey Glass and Cathleen (Green). His father was the son of Robert Franklin Glass, son of Thomas Jordan Glass, a casualty of the 1885 Tristan da Cunha lifeboat disaster, and son of the island's founder William Glass. Glass is the cousin of former Chief Islanders Albert Glass, Conrad Glass, James Glass and Anne Green.
