= Table Bay Marine Cup =

Association football championship in Tristan da Cunha

- Organising body: Tristan da Cunha Football Association
- Founded: 2005
- First season: 2009
- Divisions: 1
- Number of clubs: 2
- Current champions: Tristan da Cunha FC
- Most championships: 4 (Tristan Tigers FC)

The Table Bay Marine Cup is an annual association football tournament held in Edinburgh of the Seven Seas, Tristan da Cunha. Competing teams contest one 5-a-side or 6-a-side game, depending on the number of players available, and the winning squad receives a trophy as a reward. It is the only championship on the island and is the most remote football championship in the world.

== History ==
The Table Bay Marine Cup was founded in June 2005, coinciding with the inception of Tristan da Cunha FC, the island's only 11-a-side football club. Cape Town based shipping company Table Bay Marine sponsors the cup. Two clubs currently contest the cup; Tristan da Cunha FC, which splits into a smaller team named the Tristan Tigers, and Sharks FC, whose players traditionally consist of employees from the local fish processing factory.

Since the tournament's inception, Tristan da Cunha FC, under the Tristan Tigers moniker, has won the title the largest number of times (3). The inaugural cup was held on Queen's Day, on 27 March 2009, in a 5-a-side game between the Tristan Tigers, captained by Leon Glass, player-coach of Tristan da Cunha FC, and a squad of South Africans. The tigers beat the visiting team to take the inaugural cup.

For the 2010 tournament, held on April 8, Tristan Tigers FC played Sharks FC. For the game, the tigers were represented by Tristan Government employees, and the sharks were represented by employees of the local fish processing factory. The tigers won the match 7–0 to take the cup. Steve Swain scored a hattrick in the game, and Patrick Green and Leon Glass scored two goals each. After a one year hiatus, the cup returned in 2012, and the Tristan Tigers were victorious over Sharks FC 2–1.

The Tigers were again victorious in 2013, facing a local mixed team of players. The cup was not hosted in 2014 or 2015, but returned in 2016, and a team captained by Adrian Swain won. For 2017, Adrian Swain's team again won with back to back titles.

== Clubs ==
Five separate teams have played in the tournament since its inception. Only two compete as of 2026.

Club	Wins	Runners Up	Winning seasons
Tristan Tigers FC	4	2	2009, 2010, 2012, 2013
Sharks FC	0	2	
South African XI	0	1	
Adrian Swain's Team	2	0	2016, 2017
Local XI	0	1	

== See also ==
- Tristan da Cunha FC
- Tristan da Cunha Football Association
