= 2019 Tristan da Cunha general election =

General elections were held in Tristan da Cunha on 26 March 2019 to elect eight members of the Island Council and the Chief Islander.

== Electoral system ==
The 12-member Island Council consists of the Administrator as President, three appointed members and eight elected members, who are elected by plurality-at-large voting. At least one elected member of the council must be a woman. If there are no women among the eight candidates that receive the most votes, only the top seven male candidates are declared elected, alongside the woman that received the highest number of votes. If there are no female candidates, a by-election is held for the eighth seat, in which only female candidates can stand.

The Chief Islander is elected on a separate ballot by first-past-the-post voting, and must also be elected to the Island Council to be eligible to become Chief Islander.

== Campaign ==
A total of 13 candidates registered to contest the eight seats on the Island Council, whilst two, James Glass and Ian Lavarello, also stood for the post of Chief Islander.

== Results ==
Of the 213 registered voters, 158 cast a vote, including nine by means of a postal vote, leading to a turnout of 74.18%. Administrator Sean Burns designated three councillors immediately after the elections.

James Glass won against Ian Lavarello for the seat of Chief Islander, becoming the first person to be elected Chief Islander for the fourth time, albeit in a non-consecutive manner. Lavarello was the only member of the previous council to be part of the newly elected council.

=== Chief Islander ===
Candidate	Votes	%
James Glass	88	62.86
Ian Lavarello	52	37.14
Total	140	100.00
Valid votes	140	88.61
Invalid/blank votes	18	11.39
Total votes	158	100.00
Registered voters/turnout	213	74.18
Source: Government News

=== Island Council ===
Candidate	Votes	%	Notes
Clive Glass	118	84.29	Elected
Rodney Green	111	79.29	Elected
Paul Repetto	101	72.14	Elected
Steve Swain	101	72.14	Elected
James Glass	96	68.57	Elected
Kelly Green	86	61.43	Elected
Jason Green	70	50.00	Elected
Ian Lavarello	66	47.14	Elected
Carlene Glass-Green	61	43.57	
Sarah Glass-Green	57	40.71	
Joanne Green	42	30.00	
Beverley Swain	37	26.43	
Marion Collins	16	11.43	
Total	962	100.00	
Valid votes	140	88.61	
Invalid/blank votes	18	11.39	
Total votes	158	100.00	
Registered voters/turnout	213	74.18	
Source: Government News

=== List of Council members ===
Elected
Chief Islander	James Glass
Councillors	Clive Glass; Rodney Green; Paul Repetto; Steve Swain; James Glass; Kelly Green; Jason Green; Ian Lavarello
Designated
Councillors	Dawn Repetto; Warren Glass; Carlene Glass-Green
