= Leon Glass (footballer) =

Tristanian footballer

Personal information
- Date of birth: 1 April 1982 (age 44)
- Position: Defender

Senior career*
Years	Team	Apps	(Gls)
2005–	Tristan da Cunha FC	18	(2)

Managerial career
- 2005–: Tristan da Cunha FC
- 2005–: Tristan da Cunha FA (President)
- * Club domestic league appearances and goals as of August 2026 ‡ National team caps and goals as of 30 May 2021

Leon Glass (born 1 April 1982) is a Tristanian footballer who plays for Tristan da Cunha FC, whom he is the manager, founder and captain.

== Career ==
He founded Tristan da Cunha FC, the only football club on Tristan da Cunha in either 2002 or June 2005.

He is a supporter of Manchester United.

He is the son of Conrad Glass, Tristanian police inspector and civil servant who was Tristan da Cunha's former Chief Islander from 2007 to 2010.
