= Tristan da Cunha FC =

Amateur football club based in Tristan da Cunha

Tristan da Cunha
- Tristan da Cunha FC before playing against the crew of RFA Lyme Bay, 24 March 2008
- Full name: Tristan da Cunha Football Club
- Nickname: The Tristan Tigers
- Founded: June 2005
- Ground: The American Field
- Capacity: 1,000
- Coordinates: 37°3′57″S 12°18′37″W
- Chairman: Leon Glass
- Manager: Leon Glass
- League: Table Bay Marine Cup
Home colours	Away colours

Tristan da Cunha FC is a football club based in Edinburgh of the Seven Seas, Tristan da Cunha. They compete in the annual Table Bay Marine Cup, a 5-a-side tournament based on the island, playing as Tristan Tigers FC against Tristan Sharks FC. Founded in June 2005 by player-manager Leon Glass, it is both the only 11-a-side football club on the island and the most remote football club in the world. The club is not affiliated with FIFA.

== History ==
=== Prior to formation ===
Football was originally introduced to Tristan da Cunha in the 1920s by Rev. Henry Rogers, when the islanders would split into two teams. The island's first "international" game was in 1940, when they played the crew of a Norwegian vessel, whose starting XI consisted of South Africans and Americans. After this, regular games were played against visiting crews. In one game on 17 January 1957, the Tristan Islanders drew 2–2 against the crew of HMY Britannia, in which Prince Philip, the Duke of Edinburgh played. These matches continued until the islanders were evacuated in 1961 after Queen Mary's Peak's eruption. Following the islanders' return, football was not resumed save for a match in January 1994 against the crew of HMS Norfolk. Football did not begin to become popular again until the 2000s after the introduction of television to the island, after which the islanders began following the Premier League and the UEFA Champions League, among other international competitions. The Tristan da Cunha Football Association was founded in 2002.

=== Formation ===
Tristan da Cunha FC was officially formed in June 2005 by Leon Glass, manager and captain of the club, and a group of islanders wanting to bring club football to the island. The team is sponsored by Ovenstone Agencies, a South Africa based shipping company. Following the club's formation, the idea of forming a three team 5-a-side league was raised, but was eventually abandoned as there was not sufficient interest from the island's population in the idea.

=== Match history ===
Tristan da Cunha FC on The American Field with the crews of vessles De Hong and MV Kelso, 23 January 2007.

Their first official game came on 6 February 2006, where they played the crews of MV Edinburgh and MV Kelso, who had formed a team. MV Edinburgh's crew took the match incredibly seriously and even kept one of the cargo holds empty on the ship so the crew had a place to train. Tristan da Cunha FC lost their debut match 6–10, after which Tristan joked that the FA would approach the captain of the winning team to fill the vacant England manager's job after the World Cup. The club's next match came only three days later on 9 February, when a game was played between the married and single players on the team. On the same day, a game was intended to be played against the crew of RMS St Helena, but it was cancelled due to poor weather. On 23 January 2007, the Tristan Tigers played the crew of salvage vessel De Hong and MV Kelso. This was their first victory as Tristan da Cunha FC, as they won 10–5. The fixture was relayed to FIFA in an attempt to convince other countries to send squads for away fixtures in Tristan da Cunha. Additionally, in April 2007, Tristan da Cunha FC played the crew of HMS Endurance, and on October 30, 2007, the club played two fixtures; In the first, Tristan da Cunha FC lost to the crew of MV Edinburgh once more, and in the second, the tigers played the crew of HMS Southampton. The team's next fixture came on Queen's Day on 24 March 2008, when Tristan da Cunha FC played the crew of RFA Lyme Bay.

The club's next games occurred later that same year, after an engineering company from South Africa called Apple Construction spent a number of months on the island building a new fish processing plant to replace one that had been destroyed by a recent fire. While on the island, the South African engineering team decided to form a football team and play against Tristan da Cunha FC in a tournament. After two matches which both ended in a 4–4 draw, Apple Construction FC challenged Tristan da Cunha FC to a final and dared them to wager their recently won trophy in the Table Bay Marine Cup. Tristan da Cunha won the match 14–2. On March 27, 2009, for Queen's Day Celebrations, a 5-a-side tournament was organised in which the Tristan Tigers defeated a team of South Africans.

Due to the island's remoteness and small population, it is difficult for the club to schedule both 11-a-side games and away games. Therefore, Tristan da Cunha FC more commonly plays 6-a-side games between its own players. The team often splits into two 6-a-side teams, the Tristan da Cunha Tigers and the Tristan Sharks. In 2010, the TDC Tigers defeated the Sharks 7–0. Steve Swain scored a hattrick in the game, and Patrick Green and Leon Glass scored two goals each.

On 28 May 2010, they played the crew of the RFA Black Rover. The tigers defeated them 9–0. On 30 October 2011, the tigers played the crew of HMS Clyde of the Royal Navy, led by Catherine Jordan. Shane Green scored a hattrick to propel Tristan da Cunha FC ahead, and the final score was 3–2. The next year in 2012, an 11-a-side game took place in the club, with a team of government employees making up the Tristan Tigers on one side and the local Fish Processing Factory representing Tristan Sharks FC on the other. The government employees won 2–1. In October 2012, Tristan da Cunha FC played the crew of HMS Protector, winning 8–0. In 2013, the team competed again in the island's Queen's Day 5-a-side tournament, which they won. Additionally, in August 2013, Tristan da Cunha FC were due to play the crew of HMS Richmond, but the match was cancelled due to poor weather. On 30 January 2015, the club played the crew of HMS Dragon. The Tigers lost 0–2. In February or March 2016, the club took part in the annual Queen's Day Celebration 5-a-side Tournament, in which Adrian Swain's team won overall. On 15 January 2017, Tristan da Cunha FC played the crews of HMS Portland and RFA Gold Rover, who had joined up to form a team. In February 2017 at the annual Queen's Day Celebration 5-a-side tournament, Adrian Swain's team again won overall.

=== Present day ===
Since 2017, the club has found it particularly difficult to schedule any matches due to a decreasing number of visiting ships and a subsequent declining interest in football among young people on the island. The club's 2017 match against the crew of HMS Portland and RFA Gold Rover was the last "international" 11-a-side game the club has played. Leon Glass has stated in interviews that, as a result of the lack of games the club plays, its number of players has dwindled and therefore it struggles to schedule even 5-a-side games.

In 2018, Leon Glass left Tristan da Cunha to relocate to Staffordshire, England, and his absence meant that Tristan da Cunha FC organised no matches following their last game in 2017. Glass returned to the island in June 2021.

Tristan da Cunha FC has been approached by CSANF, but was unable to join due to a lack of facilities and funding. Additionally, the club has considered joining the Island Games. The club has also explored the feasibility of joining the Saint Helena Football League, a championship played on neighboring island of Saint Helena in which six teams compete. Tristan da Cunha has not played against Saint Helena football team; it was rumoured that the Tigers had lost 9–0, the result of a miscommunication in the results of two games the teams had played, Saint Helena's 9–0 defeat to Guernsey at the Island Games and Tristan da Cunha's 9–0 victory over the crew of RFA Black Rover. Furthermore, in 2012 the club was invited to a 5-a-side championship in Mallorca. However, due to shipping schedules and no travel funding, the Tigers were unable to attend.

The team fields five players annually to compete in the Table Bay Marine Cup, the only football tournament on the island. These five players compete for Tristan Tigers FC against the Tristan Sharks, whose XI consists of employees from the local fish processing factory. The Tristan Tigers have won the cup the most number of times (4).

=== Players ===
The club's player number has dwindled in recent years. The club does, however, still have enough players for casual games. The players listed below are those who have been recorded to have had played for the club throughout its history. Note: Flags indicate national team as defined under FIFA eligibility rules; some limited exceptions apply. Players may hold more than one non-FIFA nationality.

No.	Pos.	Nation	Player
—	DF	Tristan da Cunha	Leon Glass (Player-coach, Captain,)
—	FW	Tristan da Cunha	Steve Swain
—	FW	Tristan da Cunha	Patrick Green
7	MF	Tristan da Cunha	Shane Green
—	MF	Tristan da Cunha	Adrian Swain
—	DF	Tristan da Cunha	Jerry Green
—	DF	Tristan da Cunha	Justin Green
—	MF	ENG	Carl Lander (Player-coach)
—	DF	GIB	Jonah Barcio

No.	Pos.	Nation	Player

Leon Glass is the team's player-coach and captain, aged 44. Steve Swain and Shane Green play as wingers for the club, and both have scored hattricks in games the club has played; their 7–0 victory against the Sharks in 2010 and their 3–2 win against the crew of HMS Clyde in 2011 respectively. Patrick Green has also played for the club in several of its games, most notably their 7–0 victory against the Sharks, in which he scored a brace. Adrian Swain has also historically played for, and captained, Tristan Tigers FC in their 5-a-side games, leading them to back-to-back titles in the Table Bay Marine Cup in 2016 and 2017 respectively. Jerry and Justin Green have also played for the club, most notably the club's game against HMS Dragon in 2015, which Tristan lost 0–2.

Carl Lander has also historically played for Tristan. Lander moved to Tristan in 2013 to work as an education adviser at St. Mary's School, where he also ran P.E classes. Lander had previously coached for Watford FC, and had intended to become involved with Tristan da Cunha FC before his arrival. Jonah Barcio has also played for the club, specifically in 2015 after which he won an award proclaiming him best footballer by Saint Mary's School.

Leon Glass has stated that Shane Green and Steve Swain have been the club's best performing players on their day throughout its history.

== Ground ==
The club plays all of their home games at The American Fence, a ground which is named after the U.S. military personnel who were stationed on the island during World War II. When it is not used for matches, the field is used for cattle grazing.

== Match history ==
=== Prior to formation ===
17 January 1957 Friendly	Islanders	2–2	HMY Britannia	The American Field
		Report

January 1994 Friendly	Islanders	v	HMS Norfolk*	The American Field
		Report

=== Club match history ===
6 February 2006 International Friendly	Tristan da Cunha FC	6–10	MV Edinburgh & MV Kelso	The American Field
		Report

23 January 2007 International friendly	Tristan da Cunha FC	10–5	Salvage XI	The American Field
		Report

April 2007 International friendly	Tristan da Cunha FC	–	HMS Endurance*	The American Field
		Report

30 October 2007 International friendly	Tristan da Cunha FC	–	MV Edinburgh*	The American Field
		Report

30 October 2007 International friendly	Tristan da Cunha FC	–	HMS Southampton*	The American Field
		Report

24 March 2008 Queen's Day	Tristan da Cunha FC	–	RFA Lyme Bay*	The American Field
16:34 GMT		Report		Referee: Sapper Gillot

2008 International Friendly	Tristan da Cunha FC	4–4	Apple Construction	The American Field

2008 International Friendly	Tristan da Cunha FC	4–4	Apple Construction	The American Field

2008 Challenge Trophy	Tristan da Cunha FC	14–2	Apple Construction	The American Field

27 March 2009 Table Bay Marine Cup	Tristan da Cunha FC	–	South African XI*	The American Field

8 April 2010 Table Bay Marine Cup	Tristan da Cunha FC	7–0	Sharks FC	The American Field
	Steve Swain; Patrick Green; Leon Glass	Report

28 May 2010 International Friendly	Tristan da Cunha FC	9–0	RFA Black Rover	The American Field
		Report

30 October 2011 International Friendly	Tristan da Cunha FC	3–2	HMS Clyde	The American Field
	Shane Green	Report

2012 Table Bay Marine Cup	Tristan da Cunha FC	2–1	Sharks FC	The American Field

October 2012 International Friendly	Tristan da Cunha FC	8–0	HMS Protector	The American Field
		Report		Referee: Sapper Gillot

2013 Table Bay Marine Cup	Tristan da Cunha FC	–	Local XI*	The American Field

30 January 2015 International Friendly	Tristan da Cunha FC	0–2	HMS Dragon	The American Field
		Report

15 January 2017 International Friendly	Tristan da Cunha FC	–	RFA Gold Rover*	The American Field
		Report

Matches marked with an asterisk (*) are matches that were played, but the result was not recorded.

== Historical kits ==
Below are the kits used by the local 5-a-side squads and the club's original kit.

TDC Tigers (2016-2017)
Sharks FC
Alternative kit

== Club culture ==
Leon Glass has stated that the majority of the players follow Manchester United F.C, while others support Arsenal F.C. and Liverpool F.C. In international football, most of the players support England, though others also support Scotland, Brazil, the Netherlands and Italy. The club trains at least once a week to keep sharpness, and plays around 3 to 6 matches a year.

Glass is player-coach of the team, and runs the squad by organizing training sessions, ordering the team kits and taking part in some matches. The club is the de facto national team of Tristan da Cunha, but, because the club does not have access to the facilities or the funds to play away games, all their matches are classified as friendlies.

== See also ==
- Tristan da Cunha Football Association
- Leon Glass
