= Tristan da Cunha Football Association =

Tristan da Cunha
- Short name: TDCFA
- Founded: 2002
- Headquarters: Edinburgh of the Seven Seas
- Location: Tristan da Cunha
- FIFA affiliation: None
- President: Leon Glass

The Tristan da Cunha Football Association is the governing body of football on Tristan da Cunha, a part of the British Overseas Territory of St. Helena, Ascension and Tristan da Cunha. The association is neither a member of the Confederation of African Football (CAF) nor FIFA. For this reason, participation in international tournaments of the two associations is excluded. Football on St. Helena and Ascension is organized independently.

The association organises the matches of Tristan da Cunha FC, as well as the island's 5-a-side tournament, the Table Bay Marine Cup, which is contested between the island's two 5-a-side teams, the Tristan da Cunha Tigers and the Sharks. Additionally, the association governs football played at the island's annual Queen's Day celebrations.

== Presidents ==
- Leon Glass (2002–present)

== Teams ==
- Tristan da Cunha FC
- Tristan Sharks
