= Ian Lavarello =

Tristanian politician (born 1970)

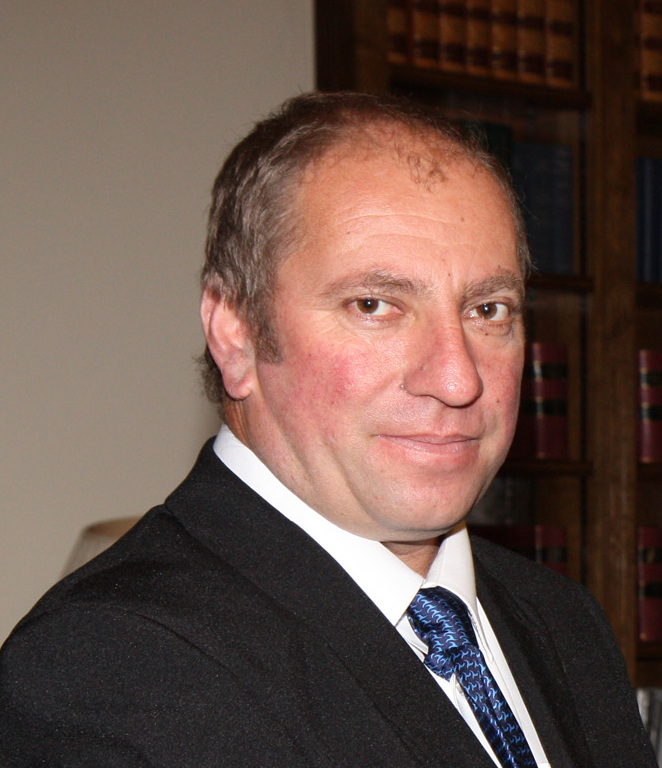
- Lavarello in 2011

Personal details
- Born: Ian Lavarello; 1970 (age 55–56) Edinburgh of the Seven Seas, Tristan da Cunha

Ian Lavarello (born 1970) is a Tristanian politician who is currently serving as Tristan da Cunha's Chief Islander. He has been elected to the role on four occasions, most recently during the 2025 Tristan da Cunha general election.

== Family ==
Lavarello was born in Edinburgh of the Seven Seas in 1970 to Gilbert Lavarello (1930–2020) and Agnes (Glass). His father was the grandson of Gaetano Lavarello, one of the two Italian-born sailors that settled on the island after their ship was shipwrecked. Gaetano was originally from Camogli. Through his maternal line, he is a descendent of William Glass, the founder of Edinburgh of the Seven Seas.
