= Harold Green (Chief Islander) =

Tristanian politician (1934–2025)

- Born: Harold Edward Green; 15 February 1934; Edinburgh of the Seven Seas, Tristan da Cunha
- Died: 27 January 2025 (aged 90); Edinburgh of the Seven Seas, Tristan da Cunha
- Occupation: Politician

Harold Edward Green (15 February 1934 – 27 January 2025) was a Tristanian politician who served as Tristan da Cunha's first Chief Islander. Green held the role of Chief Islander on three occasions.

== Family ==
Green was the son of John Edward Green and Sophia Louisa (Rogers). Through his paternal line, he is descended from Pieter Willem Groen, a native of Zuid-Holland, Netherlands.
