= Islands of Refreshment =

1811–1816 micronation in Tristan da Cunha

- 1811–1816
- Flag

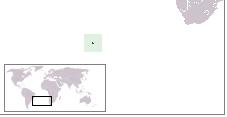
- Status: Unrecognised state
- Capital: Reception
- Official languages: English

Government
  - Leader: Jonathan Lambert
- History
  - Declared: February 4, 1811
  - Death of Lambert: May 17, 1812
  - Annexed to Cape Colony by United Kingdom: August 14, 1816

Area
  - Total: 207 km^{2} (80 sq mi)
- Membership: 4 (1811)
- Currency: Spanish dollar
Succeeded by
Cape Colony

Islands of Refreshment was the name given to Tristan da Cunha by its self-proclaimed ruler, Jonathan Lambert, in 1811.

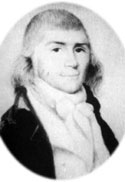
Captain Jonathan Lambert

== History ==
In the early 19th century American whalers frequented the neighboring waters and, on December 27, 1810, the Boston ship Baltic put ashore an American named Jonathan Lambert along with one Tommaso Corri (an Italian from Livorno given the alias Thomas Currie) in his employ, and a third man named Williams. These three were the first permanent inhabitants of Tristan, and they were soon joined by a fourth, Andrew Millet.

Lambert declared himself sovereign and sole possessor of the island group and sent a proclamation back to Boston where it was published by the Boston Gazette:

"Know all men by these presents that I, Jonathan Lambert, late of Salem, in the State of Massachusetts, United States of America, and citizen thereof, have this 4th day of February in the year of Our Lord 1811, taken absolute possession of the Islands of Tristan da Cunha, so called, viz. the great island and the other two known by the names of Inaccessible and Nightingale Islands, solely for myself and my heirs, forever... grounding my right and claim on the rational and sure principles of absolute occupancy, and as such, holding and possessing all the rights, titles and immunities properly belonging to proprietors by the usage of nations. In consequence of this right and title by me thus assumed and established, I do further declare, that the said Islands shall for the future be denominated the ISLANDS OF REFRESHMENT, the great Island bearing that name in particular, and the landing-place on the north side a little to the east of the Cascade be called RECEPTION, which shall be my place of residence... I do hereby invite all those who may want refreshments to call at Reception, where by laying by, opposite the Cascade, they will be immediately visited by a boat from the shore, and speedily supplied with such things as the Islands may produce, at a reasonable price..."

He renamed the main island "Island of Refreshment", Inaccessible Island "Pintard Island" and Nightingale Island "Lovel Island" and his settlement (in and around the present-day Edinburgh of the Seven Seas), "Reception". Lambert planned to create an economy from selling sealskins and oil to buyers in Rio de Janeiro. Southern elephant seals were apparently numerous on the islands and the men had killed at least 80 since landing, which they had used the blubber of to make oil. In January 1812, the islands were visited by the British merchant schooner Charles, Lambert told the captain of the ship that he would be willing to become a British subject if he was provided by the British with assistance and supplies. This never materialized though, since four months later on May 17, 1812, Lambert, Williams and Millet drowned while fishing. The lone survivor, Tomasso Corri was joined by two other men, and the three busied themselves growing vegetables, wheat and oats, and breeding pigs.

During the War of 1812, the islands were used as a base by American cruisers sent to prey on British merchant ships. This and other considerations urged by Lord Charles Henry Somerset, then-governor of Cape Colony in South Africa, led the British government to annex the islands as dependencies of the Cape Colony. The formal proclamation of annexation was made on August 14, 1816, partly as a measure to ensure the French could not use the islands as a base for a rescue operation to free the deposed Napoleon I of France from his prison on Saint Helena.
