= Iris Green =

Iris Green is a civil servant and politician in Tristan da Cunha. Since 2007, she has been the remote island territory's postmaster. She is also a member since 2025 of the Tristan da Cunha Island Council, which she previously served on from 2007 to 2019.

== Biography ==
Iris Green is from Tristan da Cunha, part of the South Atlantic British Overseas Territory of Saint Helena, Ascension and Tristan da Cunha. She is the daughter of former Tristan da Cunha Chief Islander Anne Green and Joseph Green.

Growing up, she attended St. Mary's School in Tristan. She then completed her education at Denstone College in England, studying economics and geography, and graduating in 1990.

Returning to Tristan da Cunha, she began working in the island's postal operations in 1991. After 16 years in the Post & Telecommunications Department and the Finance Department, in 2007 she was appointed postmaster of Tristan da Cunha, a role she has held ever since. Her work involves overseeing the department's operations and producing commemorative stamps and coins, which are sought after by collectors.

Green also serves on the Tristan da Cunha Island Council. She was first elected in 2007 as part of a new wave of candidates who unseated the incumbents. A competitive election was not held in 2010 due to a shortage of candidates, so Green automatically retained her post on the council.

While she did not stand for election in 2013, she was appointed directly to the council by Administrator Sean Burns. She was reappointed to another three-year term by Administrator Alex Mitham in 2016, but she did not remain on the Council in 2019.

Then in 2025, Green ran again for the council, and she was elected to return to the legislature.
