= Rolf Weijburg =

Dutch artist

- Born: 1952 (age 73–74); Eindhoven, Netherlands
- Education: Utrecht School of the Arts
- Known for: Graphics, Etching, Illustration, Drawing
- Website: http://www.weijburg.nl/

Rolf Weijburg (born 1952) is a Dutch graphic artist, specializing in the art of etching.

== Biography ==
Weijburg was born in Eindhoven. Aged 18, he attended Utrecht University to study social geography. After a year, Weijburg switched to study at the Academy of Arts and the following five years were dedicated to mastering the art of etching. Amongst his tutors were Dick van 't Wout and Fred Koot. In 1976, Rolf Weijburg graduated in Monumental Art.

Weijburg is recognized as one of the best sketching artists of his time and still resides in Utrecht, the Netherlands.

== Work ==
Weijburg's work comprises various etches and other graphics, published articles and books.

Four large series of color-etchings have been developed by Rolf Weijburg:

- L'Afrique Périphérique – An Atlas of the Islands around Africa, consisting of over 85 color-etchings has been completed
- Home, "a series about houses and about where home is. About all those red dots on the map. The houses they consist of, the people who live in them. Home away from Home."
- Home: Shibam, Hadramawt, a color etching based on his 1992 travels to Hadhramaut in Yemen; the start of a new series
- Local Beauties, picturing local beauties around the world. After receiving a postcard from Sri Lanka, Weijburg found inspiration for a new series. The postcard, which seemed to be hand-coloured was divided into four rectangles with ladies in local dress in each rectangle. The reading on the card gave the inspiration: Local Beauties.
- Atlas of The Worlds Smallest Countries, a series of etchings on the 25 smallest independent countries of the world

The Rijksmuseum in Amsterdam has some works of Weijburg in their collection. Rolf Weijburg has also accepted to do commissioned work, such as providing illustrations for the Djoser travel brochures, the website of 'De Russenoorlog' and Weijburg provided the charts and map for the 35-episode series In Europa (2007-2009), after Geert Mak's book by the same title.

== Publications ==
- Grensgevallen – over grenzen in Afrika, Europa en het Midden-Oosten. (ISBN 978-90-90-33376-2, 2020);
- Inviting the World at Home, A survey of the world's postal links to the Netherlands. (ISBN 978-90-450-1612-2, 2009);
- Mes Carnets des Îles (ISBN 978-2-08-010880-7, 2002);
- L'Afrique Périphérique – Een Atlas van de Eilanden rond Afrika. (ISBN 978-90-90-13579-3, 2000).

In 2017 a documentary, "the Art of Travel" by Arnold van Bruggen and Eefje Blankevoort, was released. It focused on Weijburg's art and how travel was part of this. It takes the viewer on a trip to Príncipe where Weijburg finishes his etching series of 'Atlas of The Worlds Smallest Countries' with "Ilha do Príncipe" of 2016.

== Awards ==
In 1992, Weijburg received the Dutch Graphics Prize (Nederlandse Grafiek Prijs) for his colour etchings

The book "Voyage au Sahara" (text: Catherine Cazier, Flammarion, Paris 1984) won the French 'Grand Prix Elan' for best Children's book in 1985. Weijburg produced the illustrations
