= Jonathan Lambert (sailor) =

American sailor (1772–1812)

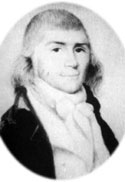

Lord and Prince of the Islands of Refreshment
- In office 1811–1812

Personal details
- Born: February 11, 1772 Salem, Massachusetts
- Died: May 17, 1812 (aged 40) Inaccessible Island
- Occupation: Sailor, seal hunter, self-proclaimed ruler of the Tristan da Cunha archipelago

Jonathan Lambert (February 11, 1772 – May 27, 1812) was an American sailor. He was the first settler, and the self-proclaimed ruler of the Tristan da Cunha archipelago.

== Biography ==
Lambert was born in Salem, Massachusetts. After a tumultuous career as a pirate, of which however, there are no surviving records, he landed on the archipelago of Tristan da Cunha as a crew member of the US whaler Grand Turk in December 1810 (according to other versions, January 5, 1811).

Lambert claimed possession of the island of Tristan de Cunha, and two neighboring islands, "The Inaccessible Island," and the "Island of Nightingales," and declared himself Lord and Prince of the islands. He later renamed the archipelago micronation as the Islands of Refreshment. The American sailor Andrew Millet and the Livorno-born Tommaso Corri also landed there with him. His activity on the islands consisted mainly in hunting earless seals and elephant seals, whose oil he sold to passing ships.

Lambert's micronation was short-lived: he died in an accident at sea only two years later, together with Millet, drowning near Inaccessible Island, without leaving any information about the supposed treasure he had amassed during his commercial activity. The circumstances of his disappearance were never clarified by Corri, when he was questioned in 1816 by the English garrison, which had annexed the islands in the name of His Britannic Majesty. Corri remained on the island as a colonist, working as a farmer.
