= Potato Patches =

Agricultural area in Tristan da Cunha

Potato Patches Patches Plain
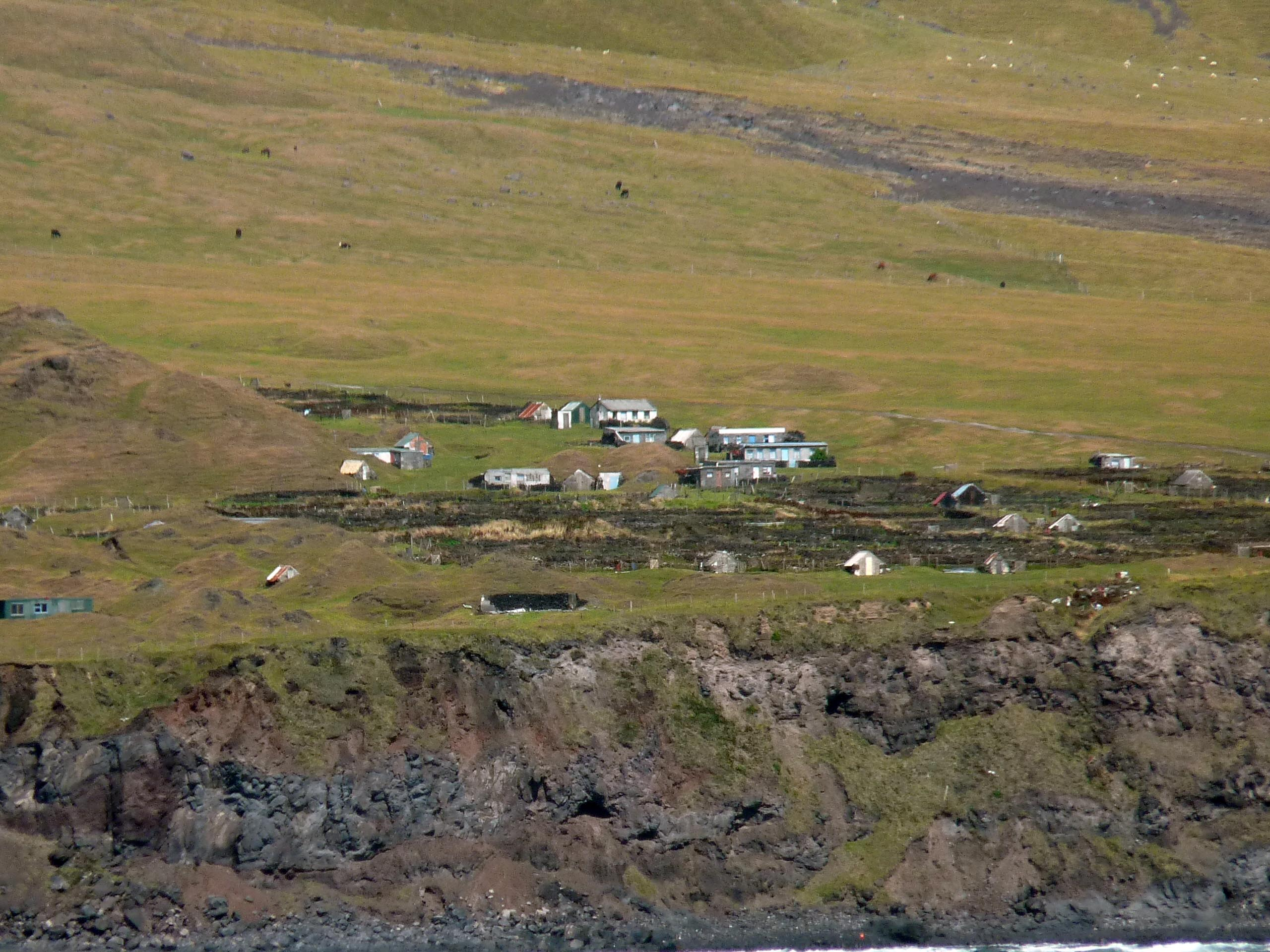
- Rural houses in Potato Patches
- Interactive map of Potato Patches
- Coordinates: 37°5′22.1″S 12°20′2.5″W
- Sovereign state: United Kingdom
- British overseas territory: Saint Helena, Ascension and Tristan da Cunha
- Island: Tristan da Cunha
- Municipality: Edinburgh of the Seven Seas
- Time zone: UTC+0 (GMT)
- Area code: +44

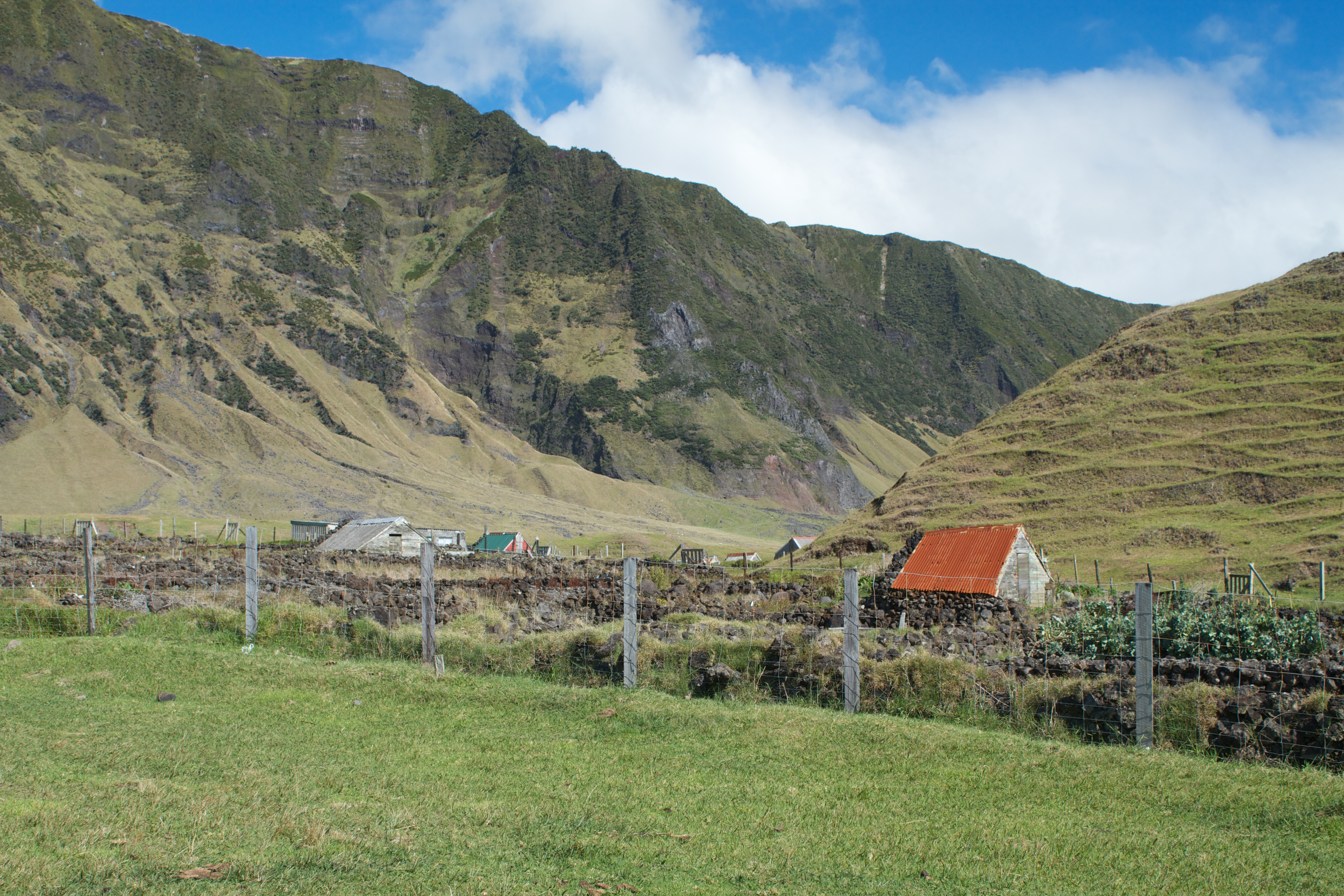
An agricultural field of Potato Patches

Potato Patches, also known as Patches Plain or colloquially as The Patches, is an agricultural area and in Tristan da Cunha, a part of the British Overseas Territory of Saint Helena, Ascension and Tristan da Cunha, in the South Atlantic Ocean.

The Potato Patches are located southwest of the islands only permanent settlement Edinburgh of the Seven Seas, along the Patches Road. It serves as the main agricultural area on Tristan da Cunha, providing a reliable food source for the islands residents.

== History ==
The plain has been used for agricultural purposes since the 1860s.

== Geography ==
Potato Patches lies 3.7 km southwest of Edinburgh of the Seven Seas and represents the largest plain of Tristan da Cunha island. For this reason the area is used by the local population as an agricultural area, the largest on the island. It is composed of various cultivated plots, hence the name, and some scattered rural farmhouses, from the coast to the M1 road.

The field is composed of irregularly arranged beds. In the beds, which are surrounded by walls to protect them from the weather, mainly potatoes and other vegetables have been planted for self-sufficiency for about 160 years. Every family on the island has their own fields that they cultivate themselves.

The plain spans from Spring Gulch to Big Sandy Gulch, next to the Boatharbour Bay and the hill of Hillpiece, on the slopes of Queen Mary's Peak (2,062 m), a volcano and the summit of the island. It is crossed by Walsh Gulch, which separates the southern plots from the other ones. To the south of Spring Gulch is located Runaway Beach, home of the island's rock pools.

== Transport ==
There is one road, the M1, which connects the Patches with Edinburgh of the Seven Seas, and is used by the few private cars on the island. A bus service called "Potato Patches Flier" (using a 24-seat Isuzu mini school bus from South Africa) is available to pensioners in town to travel to places around the island.

== See also ==
- Tristan hotspot
- Sandy Point, Tristan da Cunha
- List of towns in Saint Helena, Ascension and Tristan da Cunha
