= St Mary's Church, Edinburgh of the Seven Seas =

Coordinates: 37.06715°S 12.3100°W

St Mary's Church
- St Mary's Church
- Location: Edinburgh of the Seven Seas
- Country: Saint Helena, Ascension and Tristan da Cunha; United Kingdom
- Denomination: Anglican

Administration
- Province: Southern Africa
- Diocese: Cape Town

St Mary's Church is an Anglican parish church in the town of Edinburgh of the Seven Seas on the island of Tristan da Cunha, one of those that make up the British overseas territory of Saint Helena, Ascension and Tristan da Cunha in the Southern Atlantic Ocean. The parish of St Mary's forms part of the Diocese of Cape Town in the Anglican Church of Southern Africa.

The church is one of two churches on the island, the other being the St. Joseph's Catholic Church.

== History ==
The church was built in 1923, under the direction of Rev. Martin Rogers. It was opened in July of that year. In 1990, the church was renovated and extended.

== See also ==
- Demographics of Saint Helena, Ascension and Tristan da Cunha
- St. Mary Church (disambiguation)
