= Tristan da Cunha Island Council =

Legislature of Tristan da Cunha

Type
- Type: Unicameral

Leadership
- Administrator of Tristan da Cunha: Philip Kendall
- Chief Islander of Tristan da Cunha: Ian Lavarello
- Seats: 11 Councillors (8 directly elected by island residents, 3 directly appointed by the Administrator)

Website
- Tristan da Cunha Island Council

The Tristan da Cunha Island Council is the unicameral non-partisan legislature of the island of Tristan da Cunha in the Atlantic Ocean. The Island Council consists of the Administrator of Tristan da Cunha as the presiding officer, plus three appointed and eight elected members. At least one elected member of the council must be a woman.

The appointed members are appointed by the Administrator of Tristan da Cunha directly.

== Electoral system ==
The 12-member Island Council consists of the Administrator as president, three appointed members and eight elected members, who are elected by plurality-at-large voting. At least one elected member of the council must be a woman. If there are no women among the eight candidates that receive the most votes, only the top seven male candidates are declared elected, alongside the woman that received the highest number of votes. If there are no female candidates, a by-election is held for the eighth seat, in which only female candidates can stand.

The Chief Islander is elected on a separate ballot by first-past-the-post voting, and must also be elected to the Island Council to be eligible to become Chief Islander. The Chief Islander's position is similar to that of a Chief Minister in other British Overseas Territories, such as Gibraltar and Anguilla. A Chief Islander's term is the same as that for the other members of the Island Council, excluding the Administrator.

== Council members ==
- Simon Glass
- Ian Lavarello (Chief Islander)
- Larry Swain
- Iris Green
- Rodney Green
- Steve Swain
- Lorraine Repetto
- Randall Repetto

Administrator Philip Kendall announced three Island Council appointments in a Public Notice published later on 6 March 2025:

- Allan Swain
- Janine Lavarello
- Vera Glass

== Previous Councils ==
=== 2007–10 ===
On 19 March 2007, the following were elected to serve on the Island Council: Lorraine Repetto, Conrad Glass, Robin Repetto, Dereck Charles Rogers, Ian Lavarello, James Patrick Glass, Iris Green, Lillie Carlene Swain. The following were appointed by the Administrator (all had previously been Chief Islanders): Harold Green, Anne Green, Lewis Green. The turnout at the election was 56.2%, markedly lower than in previous years.

=== 2010–13 ===
In 2010, all the Island Council posts were uncontested (an election had been scheduled for 10 March). The following candidates were therefore returned without the need for an election: Ian Lavarello, Robin Repetto, Marion Green, Beverley Repetto, Dereck Rogers, James Glass, Lorraine Repetto, Iris Green, Dawn Repetto, Conrad Glass, and Anne Green.

=== 2013–16 ===
As in 2010, there were eight nominations for the eight places on the Island Council so an election was not held and all candidates were automatically returned. Apart from Ian Lavarello, all the new Councillors had not served before. The returned candidates were: Leon Glass, Warren Glass, Joanne Green, Ian Lavarello, Gerald Repetto, Beverley Swain, Emma Swain, Neil Swain. Additionally, the Administrator appointed Iris Green, Conrad Glass and Lorraine Repetto.

=== 2016–19 ===
On 9 March 2016, with a turnout of 83%, the following eight Councillors were elected to the Tristan da Cunha Island Council for the 2016 to 2019 legislative term:

- James Glass
- Warren Glass
- Sarah Green
- Terence Green
- Ian Lavarello (Note: Ian Lavarello was also elected as Chief Islander of Tristan da Cunha for a third consecutive term. He has served in this position from April 2010 to April 2019.)
- Lorraine Repetto
- Emma Swain
- Paula Swain

In addition, the three additional Councillors, who were appointed to the Island Council by the Administrator of Tristan da Cunha, Alex Mitham, are:

- Conrad Glass (Note: Prior to Lavarello's election, Conrad Glass was the Chief Islander of Tristan.)
- Harold Green
- Iris Green

=== 2019–2022 ===
On 26 March 2019, with a turnout of 74.6%, the following eight Councillors were elected to the Tristan da Cunha Island Council for the 2019 to 2022 legislative term:

- Clive Glass
- Rodney Green
- Paul Repetto
- Steve Swain
- James Glass (Note: James Glass was also elected as Chief Islander of Tristan da Cunha for a fourth term.)
- Kelly Green
- Jason Green
- Ian Lavarello

In addition, the three additional Councillors, who were appointed to the Island Council by the Administrator of Tristan da Cunha are:

- Carlene Glass-Green
- Warren Glass
- Dawn Repetto

=== 2022–2025 ===
On 23 March 2022, it was announced that the 2022 Island Council elections were not held, as no more than eight candidates contested the election.

Elected members:

- Conrad Glass
- James Glass (Chief Islander)
- Vera Glass
- Warren Glass
- Rodney Green
- Terence Green
- Ian Lavarello
- Steve Swain

Members nominated by the Joint Administrators:

- Carlene Glass-Green
- Anne Green
- Beverley Swain

== Chief Islanders ==
Voters can choose on a separate list councillors candidates who are also candidates for being Chief Islander, and the candidate with the most votes becomes Tristan da Cunha's Chief Islander. The following were elected to the post for the years indicated:

No.	Chief Islander	Took office	Left office	Tenure	Election	Monarch Reign
1	Harold Green (1934–2025); 1st time	1970	1973	3 years	1970	Elizabeth II r. 1952–2022
2	Albert Glass (1935–2007); 1st time	1973	1979	6 years	1973	Elizabeth II r. 1952–2022
2	Albert Glass (1935–2007); 1st time	1973	1979	6 years	1976	Elizabeth II r. 1952–2022
(1)	Harold Green (1934–2025); 2nd time	1979	1982	3 years	1979	Elizabeth II r. 1952–2022
(2)	Albert Glass (1935–2007); 2nd time	1982	1985	3 years	1982	Elizabeth II r. 1952–2022
(1)	Harold Green (1934–2025); 3rd time	1985	1988	3 years	1985	Elizabeth II r. 1952–2022
3	Anne Green (born 1952); 1st time	1988	1991	3 years	1988	Elizabeth II r. 1952–2022
4	Lewis Glass (1948–2019)	1991	1994	3 years	1991	Elizabeth II r. 1952–2022
5	James Glass (born 1961); 1st time	1994	2003	9 years	1994	Elizabeth II r. 1952–2022
5	James Glass (born 1961); 1st time	1994	2003	9 years	1997	Elizabeth II r. 1952–2022
5	James Glass (born 1961); 1st time	1994	2003	9 years	2000	Elizabeth II r. 1952–2022
(3)	Anne Green (born 1952); 2nd time	2003	2007	4 years	2003	Elizabeth II r. 1952–2022
6	Conrad Glass (born 1961)	2007	April 2010	3 years	2007	Elizabeth II r. 1952–2022
7	Ian Lavarello (born 1970); 1st time	April 2010	April 2019	9 years	2010	Elizabeth II r. 1952–2022
7	Ian Lavarello (born 1970); 1st time	April 2010	April 2019	9 years	2013	Elizabeth II r. 1952–2022
7	Ian Lavarello (born 1970); 1st time	April 2010	April 2019	9 years	2016	Elizabeth II r. 1952–2022
(5)	James Glass (born 1961); 2nd time	April 2019	2025	6 years	2019	Elizabeth II r. 1952–2022
(5)	James Glass (born 1961); 2nd time	April 2019	2025	6 years	2022	Charles III r. 2022–present
(7)	Ian Lavarello (born 1970); 2nd time	2025	Incumbent	0–1 years	2025	Charles III r. 2022–present

== Timeline of chief islanders ==
This is a graphical lifespan timeline of chief islanders of Tristan da Cunha. They are listed in order of first assuming office.

== See also ==
- Legislative Council of Saint Helena
- Ascension Island Council
