= William Glass =

Scottish settler of Tristan da Cunha (1786–1853)

- Born: William Glasgow; 11 May 1786; Kelso, Scotland
- Died: 1853 (aged 66–67); Edinburgh of the Seven Seas, Tristan da Cunha
- Occupations: soldier, fisherman, settler
- Spouse: Maria Magdalena Leenders
- Children: 16

William Glass (11 May 1786 – 1853) was a Scottish corporal and settler. He established the settlement that would become Edinburgh of the Seven Seas, the main settlement on Tristan da Cunha.

== Early life ==
William Glass was born William Glasgow in Kelso, Scotland, in the Scottish Borders region, on 11 May 1786, to David and Janet Glasgow. He enlisted into the British Army at Berwick-upon-Tweed in March 1804. Although it is unclear why, he enlisted under the surname Glass.

== Military career ==
While serving in Cape Town in 1816, Glass was sent to the remote uninhabited island of Tristan da Cunha as part of a garrison to secure the island in the event that the recently defeated Napoleon Bonaparte, then exiled on St Helena island, might use the island as a base to plan an attack. The soldiers were called back the following year. However, William and another man requested permission to remain permanently on the island. This request was granted by Lord Charles Somerset. William also brought his South African wife, Maria Magdalena Leenders and two children. Many others soon followed and by 1852 the population was 52.

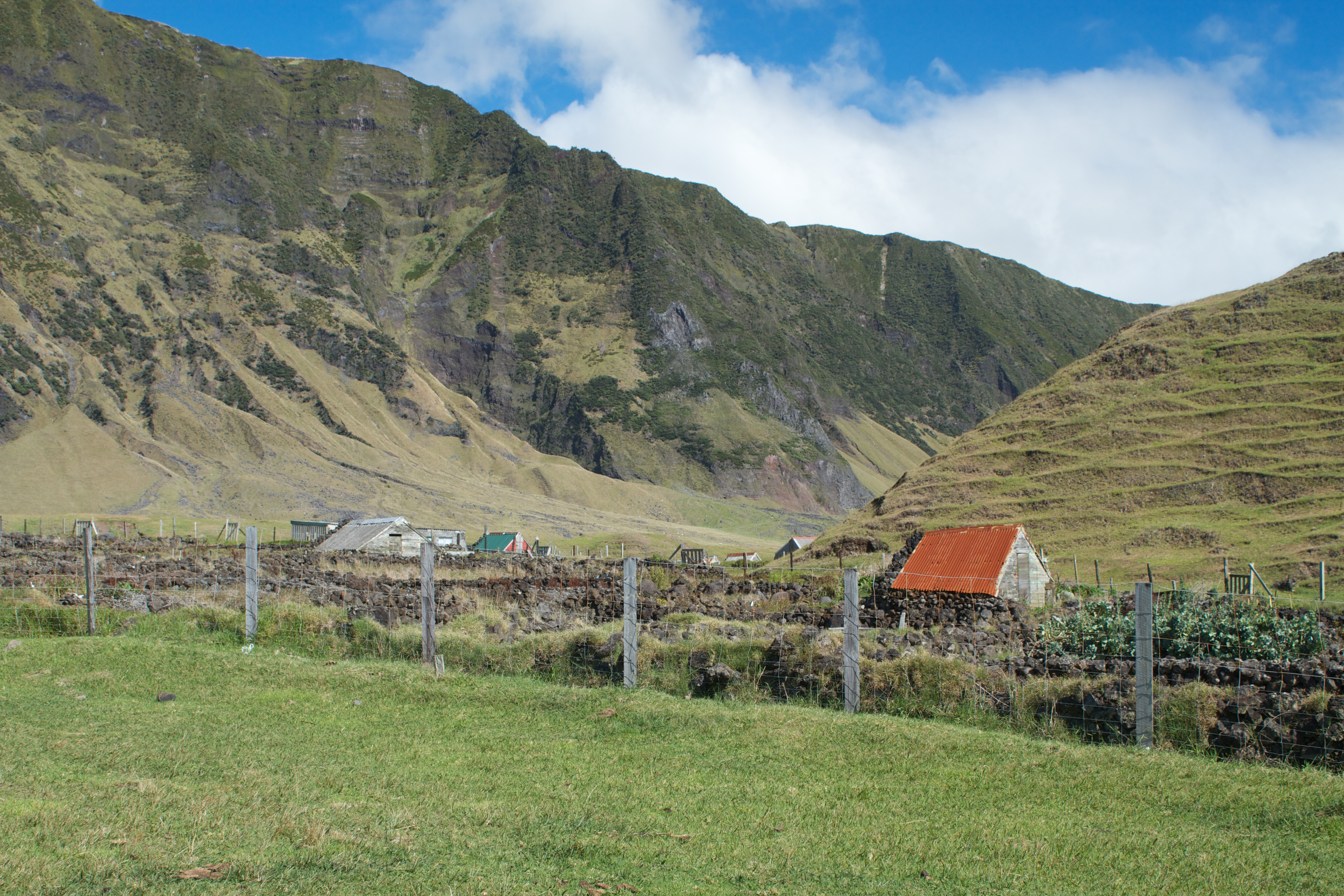
Potato Patches at Edinburgh of the Seven Seas, the town founded by William Glass

== Death ==
William Glass died on the island in 1853. Many of his descendants remain on the island. Notable descendants include police officer Conrad Glass and politicians James and Lewis Glass and Anne Green. The Glass surname remains one of the most common amongst the local population.

Upon his death, his wife and their children relocated to New London, Connecticut. A son, Thomas Glass and a grandson returned ten years later and settled in the old family home on the island. He married Mary, a daughter of Thomas Hill Swain and had five sons: Joseph, John, Robert, William and Thomas, as well as a daughter Jane (she married Italian emigrant Gaetano Lavarello). Thomas Sr. would perish at sea in 1885 along with most of the island's able bodied men who were taking trade goods out in the island's lifeboat to a passing vessel.
