= Edinburgh of the Seven Seas =

Remote settlement on Tristan da Cunha, UK

Edinburgh of the Seven Seas "The Settlement"
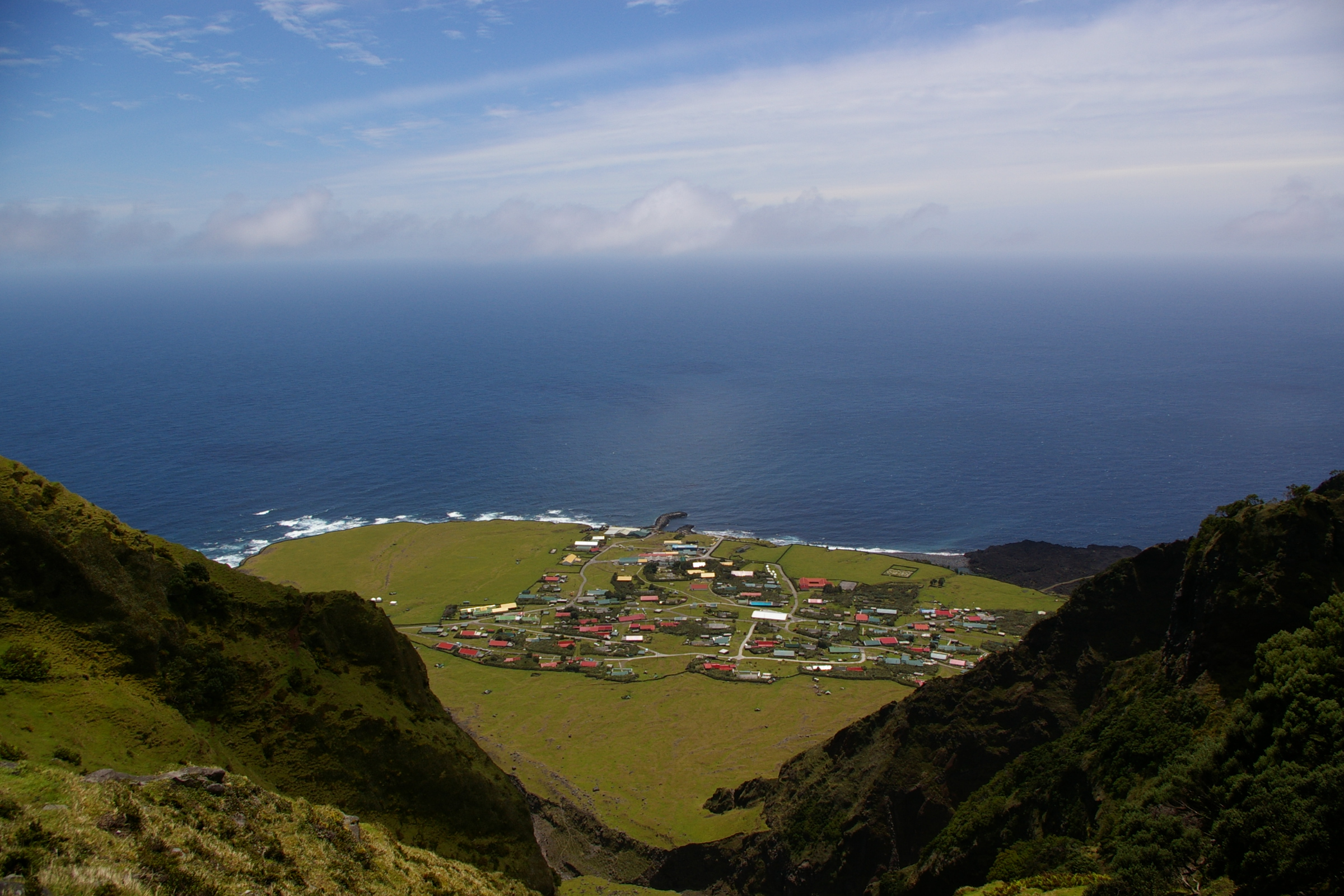
- Interactive map of Edinburgh of the Seven Seas
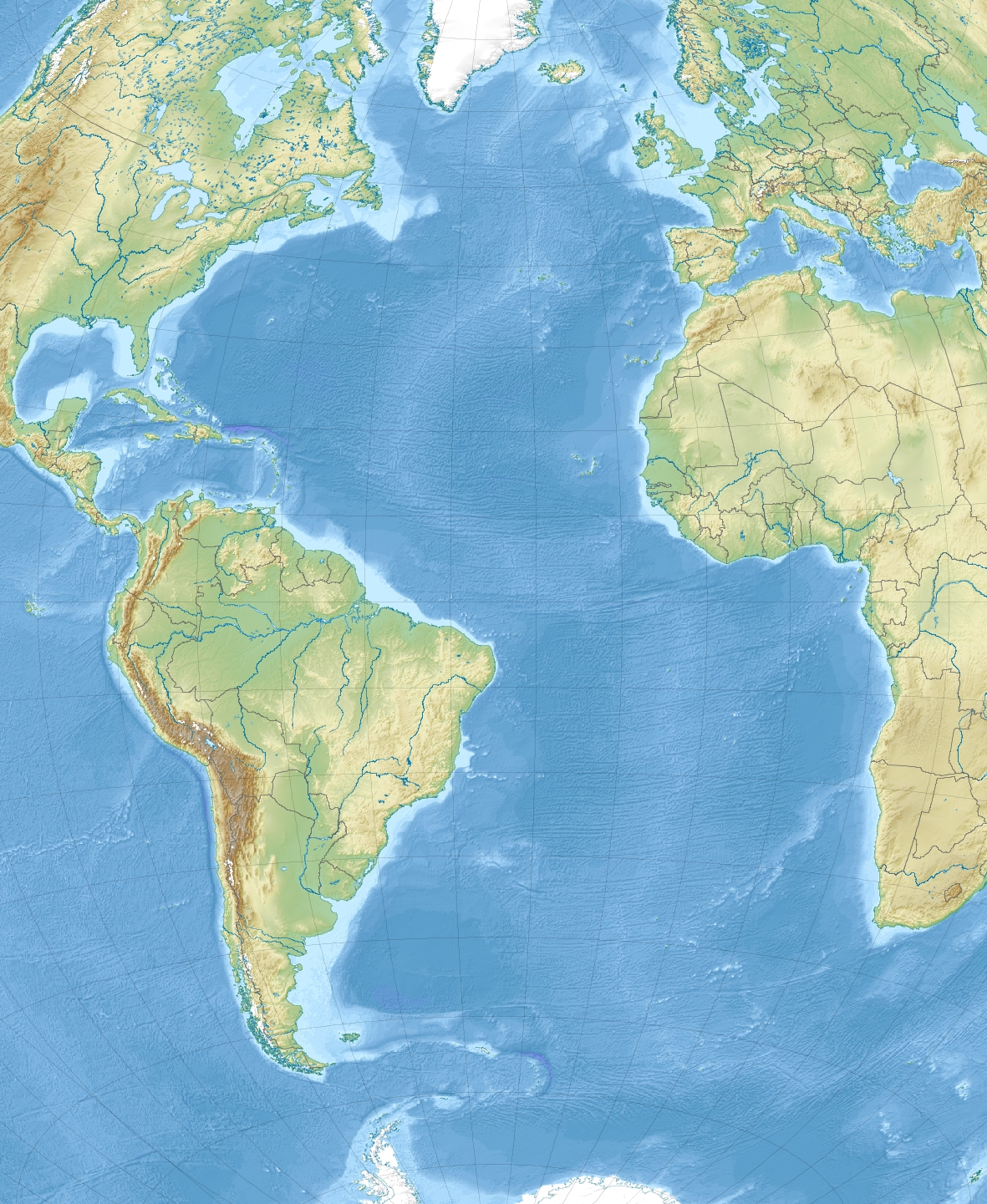
- Location within Atlantic Ocean
- Coordinates: 37°4′2.2″S 12°18′36″W
- Sovereign state: United Kingdom
- British overseas territory: Saint Helena, Ascension and Tristan da Cunha
- Island: Tristan da Cunha
- First inhabited: 1816
- Named: 1971
- Founder: William Glass
- Named for: Alfred, Duke of Edinburgh
- Capital of: Tristan da Cunha

Area
  - Total: 0.097 sq mi (0.25 km^{2})

Population (2026)
  - Total: 221
- Time zone: UTC+0 (GMT)
- Area code: +88

Road map of Edinburgh of the Seven Seas

Edinburgh of the Seven Seas (ESS), known locally as The Settlement or The Village, is a small village and the only settlement on the remote island of Tristan da Cunha, a part of the British Overseas Territory of Saint Helena, Ascension and Tristan da Cunha in the South Atlantic Ocean. It is one of the most remote permanent settlements in the world, lying 2,434 kilometres (1,512 mi) away from Jamestown, St. Helena, the nearest settlement to the village.

== History ==
The settlement was founded on the island of Tristan da Cunha in 1816 by Sergeant William Glass from Kelso, Scottish Borders, who named it after Prince Alfred, Duke of Edinburgh, the second son of Queen Victoria, in honour of his visit to the island in 1867 following the United Kingdom's annexation of Tristan da Cunha.

A military garrison was maintained on the islands to assist in guarding against French attempts to rescue Napoleon, who was briefly imprisoned on Saint Helena. The garrison remained until the end of World War II.

The settlement was damaged in a volcanic eruption on the island in 1961, destroying the island's original crayfish factory and forcing the population to evacuate to Calshot, United Kingdom (UK); most islanders returned in 1963. The village's harbour was subsequently named Calshot Harbour after the British town.

Edinburgh of the Seven Seas remains the only permanent settlement of Tristan da Cunha, and contains a small port, the administrator's residence, post office, school (St. Mary's school), and church (St. Joseph's church). It also has an internet café, a bar, a supermarket, a golf club, and a swimming pool.

== Geography ==
=== Climate ===
The archipelago has a wet oceanic climate under the Köppen system, with mild temperatures but consistent, moderate-to-heavy rainfall and very limited sunshine, due to the persistent westerly winds. Under the Trewartha classification, Tristan da Cunha has a humid subtropical climate due to the lack of cold weather, and it has a mild oceanic climate (Cfb) according to the Köppen climate classification, with an absence of extreme temperatures. The number of rainy days is comparable to the Aleutian Islands at a much higher latitude in the northern hemisphere, while sunshine hours are comparable to Juneau, Alaska, 20° farther from the equator. Frost is unknown below elevations of 500 metres (1,600 ft) and summer temperatures are similarly mild, never reaching above 25 °C (77 °F). Sandy Point on the east coast is reputed to be the warmest and driest place on the island, being in the lee of the prevailing winds.

Climate data for Tristan da Cunha
Month	Jan	Feb	Mar	Apr	May	Jun	Jul	Aug	Sep	Oct	Nov	Dec	Year
Record high °C (°F)	23.7 (74.7)	24.4 (75.9)	24.4 (75.9)	22.4 (72.3)	20.3 (68.5)	18.7 (65.7)	17.8 (64.0)	17.3 (63.1)	17.1 (62.8)	18.4 (65.1)	22.4 (72.3)	21.8 (71.2)	24.4 (75.9)
Mean daily maximum °C (°F)	20.4 (68.7)	21.2 (70.2)	20.5 (68.9)	18.9 (66.0)	16.9 (62.4)	15.3 (59.5)	14.4 (57.9)	14.2 (57.6)	14.3 (57.7)	15.4 (59.7)	17.0 (62.6)	18.9 (66.0)	17.3 (63.1)
Daily mean °C (°F)	17.9 (64.2)	18.8 (65.8)	17.9 (64.2)	15.4 (59.7)	14.6 (58.3)	13.1 (55.6)	12.2 (54.0)	11.9 (53.4)	12.0 (53.6)	13.0 (55.4)	14.6 (58.3)	16.5 (61.7)	14.8 (58.6)
Mean daily minimum °C (°F)	15.4 (59.7)	16.2 (61.2)	15.3 (59.5)	11.9 (53.4)	12.3 (54.1)	10.9 (51.6)	10.0 (50.0)	9.6 (49.3)	9.7 (49.5)	10.6 (51.1)	12.2 (54.0)	14.1 (57.4)	12.4 (54.3)
Record low °C (°F)	10.9 (51.6)	11.8 (53.2)	10.3 (50.5)	9.5 (49.1)	7.4 (45.3)	6.3 (43.3)	4.8 (40.6)	4.6 (40.3)	5.1 (41.2)	6.4 (43.5)	8.3 (46.9)	9.7 (49.5)	4.6 (40.3)
Average rainfall mm (inches)	93 (3.7)	113 (4.4)	121 (4.8)	129 (5.1)	155 (6.1)	160 (6.3)	160 (6.3)	175 (6.9)	169 (6.7)	151 (5.9)	128 (5.0)	127 (5.0)	1,681 (66.2)
Average rainy days	18	17	17	20	23	23	25	26	24	22	18	19	252
Average relative humidity (%)	79	77	75	78	78	79	79	79	78	79	79	80	78
Mean monthly sunshine hours	139.5	144.0	145.7	129.0	108.5	99.0	105.4	105.4	120.0	133.3	138.0	130.2	1,498
Percentage possible sunshine	31	35	38	38	35	34	34	32	33	33	32	29	34
Source 1: Worldwide Bioclimatic Classification System
Source 2: Climate and Temperature

Edinburgh of the Seven Seas

Climate chart (precipitation, max. and min. temperature)
J	F	M	A	M	J	J	A	S	O	N	D
93 20 16	113 21 17	121 20 16	129 18 15	155 17 13	160 15 11	160 14 11	175 14 10	169 14 10	151 15 11	128 17 13	127 19 15
- █ Average max. and min. temperatures in °C
- █ Precipitation totals in mm
- Source: Climate and Temperature Information
Imperial conversion
J	F	M	A	M	J	J	A	S	O	N	D
3.7 68 61	4.4 70 63	4.8 68 61	5.1 64 59	6.1 63 55	6.3 59 52	6.3 57 52	6.9 57 50	6.7 57 50	5.9 59 52	5 63 55	5 66 59
- █ Average max. and min. temperatures in °F
- █ Precipitation totals in inches

== Transport ==
There is one road, nicknamed the "M1" after the namesake motorway in England, which connects the village with the Potato Patches (or The Patches), the primary agricultural area, and is used by the few private cars on the island. Paved paths provide walking access to buildings around town. A bus service called Potato Patches Flier (using a 24-seat Isuzu mini school bus from Cape Town, South Africa) is available for free to pensioners to travel to the Patches and other stops along the road.

All motor vehicles on the island have Tristan da Cunha plates consisting of "TDC" followed by two or three digits.

The settlement has a small port named after the village of Calshot, where the population of Tristan da Cunha stayed during the 1961 volcanic eruption, with berths accessible by small vessels only. The island has around 10 scheduled ship visits per year for tourists and island residents to travel to and from the island on multi-day trips (typically 6-10 days) from South Africa or Namibia.

== Art ==
Graphic artist Rolf Weijburg produced an etch of Edinburgh of the Seven Seas and other places on the island of Tristan da Cunha.

== Local government ==
The island's local affairs are managed by the Tristan da Cunha Island Council, an 11-member administration that meets six times a year and is elected every three years.

=== Government services ===
The town is home to the island's emergency services, which comprise one ambulance (a Toyota Hilux operated by Camogli Hospital), one fire engine (a Land Rover Defender with a small ladder) and one police car (Land Rover Series).

The town administration also has a personal vehicle for official use.

== Places of interest and attractions ==
Most buildings in town are small, single-story structures, with the Crayfish Canning Factory as the largest by floor area and St. Joseph Catholic Church as the tallest.

- St Mary's Anglican Church – built in 1923
- St Joseph Catholic Church – built in 1995–96 to replace an earlier church from 1983
- St Mary's School – built in 1975, educates children between 3–16
- Camogli Hospital – built in 1971 to replace Station Hospital (c. 1940s)
- Calshot Harbour – built in 1967, with reinforcements and renovations done in 2008–2009
- Prince Philip Hall and the Albatross Bar – built in 1957 and refurbished as a pub in the 1980s
- Tristan Thatched House Museum – built in 2013, began by pensioners in January 2009
- Agriculture Department warehouse
- Tristan Island Store – only supermarket on the island
- Tristan Post Office, Tourism Centre and Café da Cunha – opened 2009
- Administration Building – home to Island Council
- Crayfish Canning Factory – built 1963
- Park 61 – volcanic park site
- The Potato Patches – an area with potato farms have been used for over 150 years. In the area are camping huts.

== Gallery ==
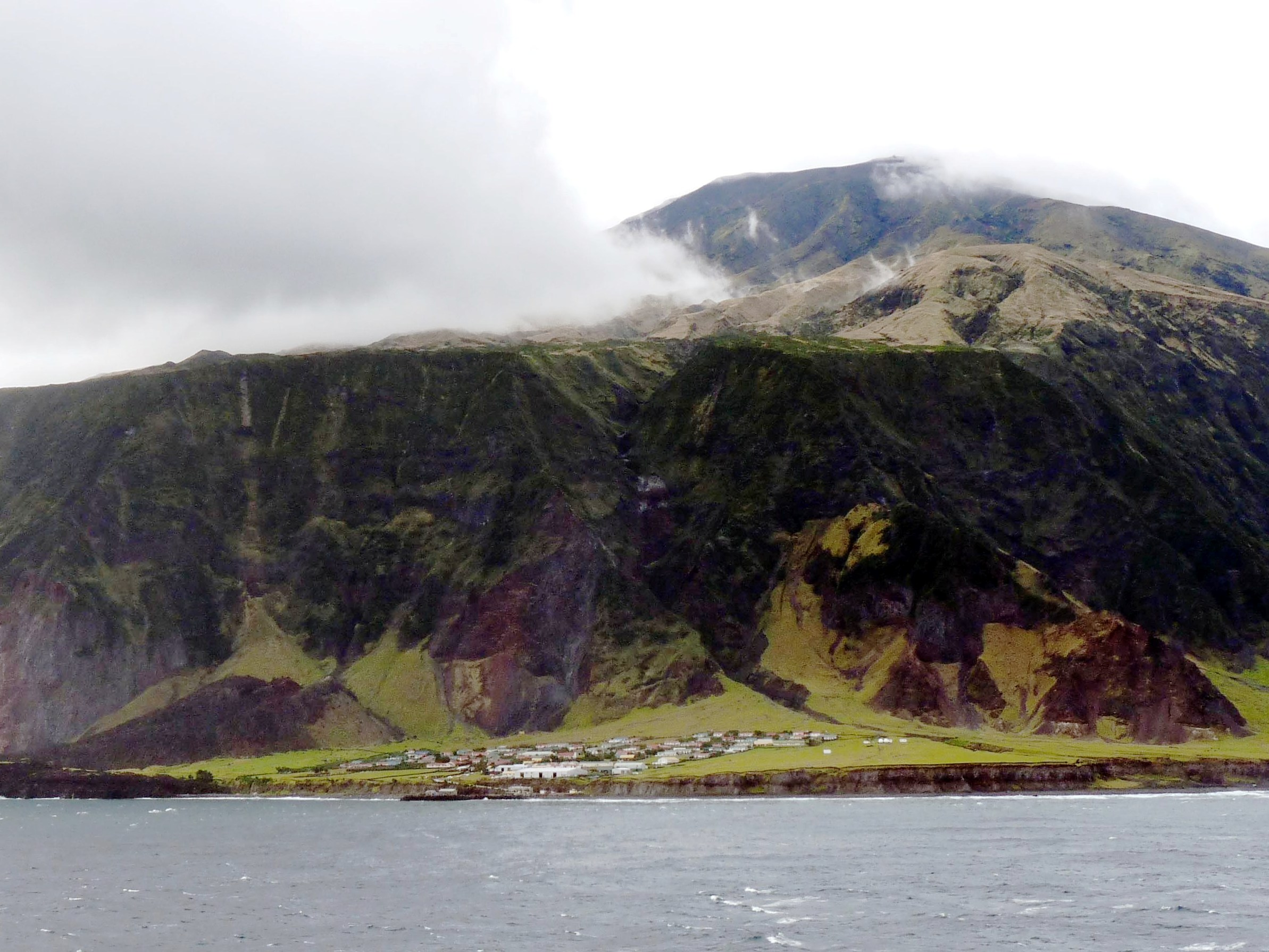
Northern coast of Tristan da Cunha, with ESS and Calshot Harbour in the lower foreground, and Queen Mary's Peak in the background.

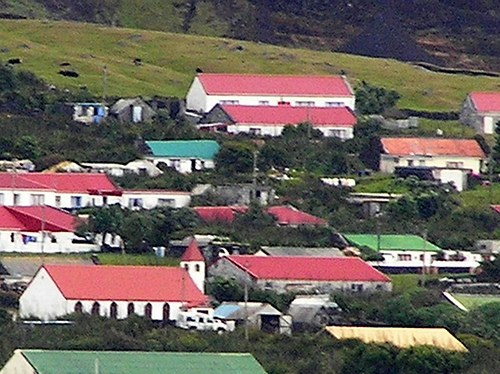
Central ESS, with St Joseph Catholic Church in the left foreground

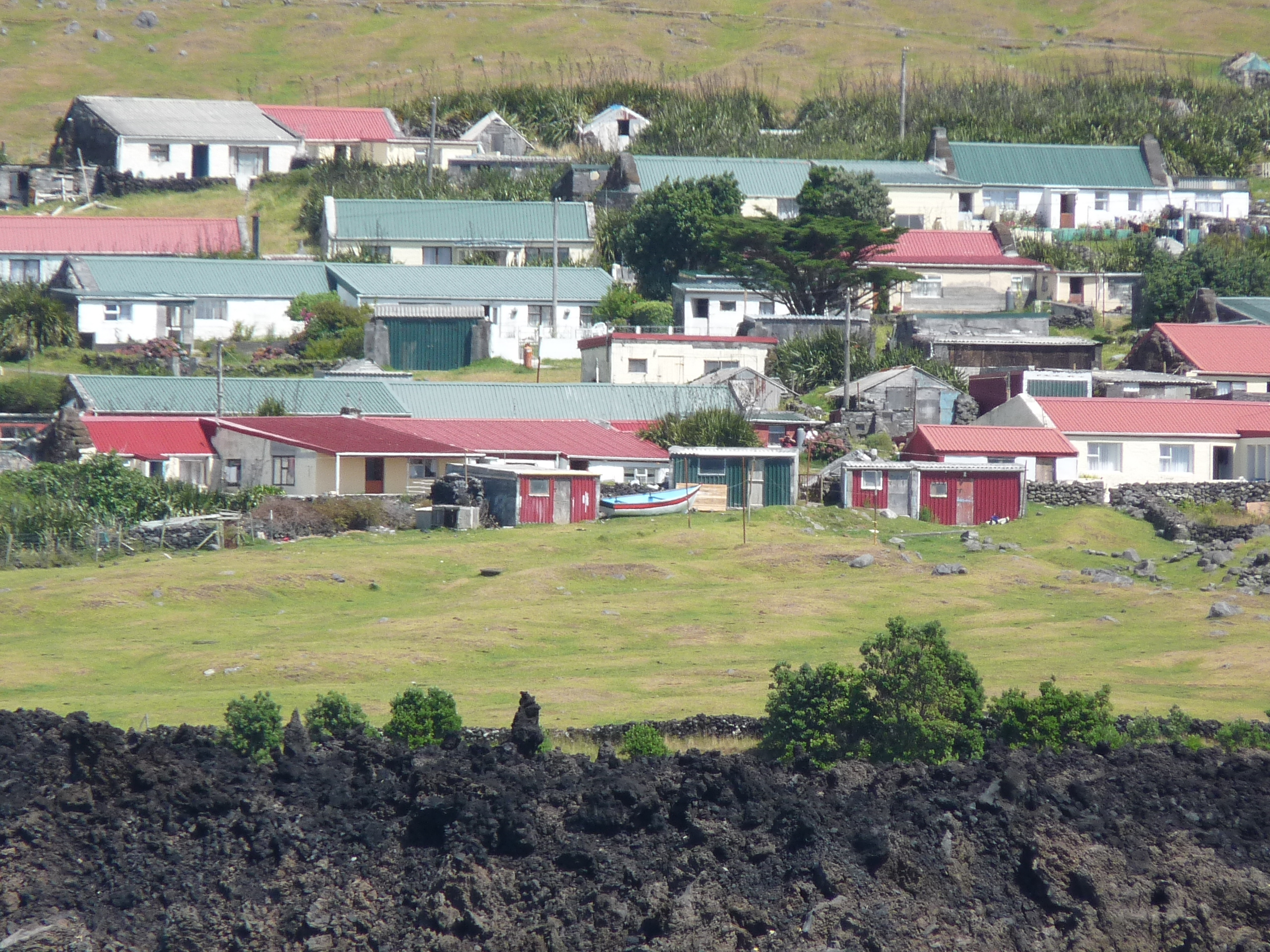
Eastern ESS, as seen from offshore

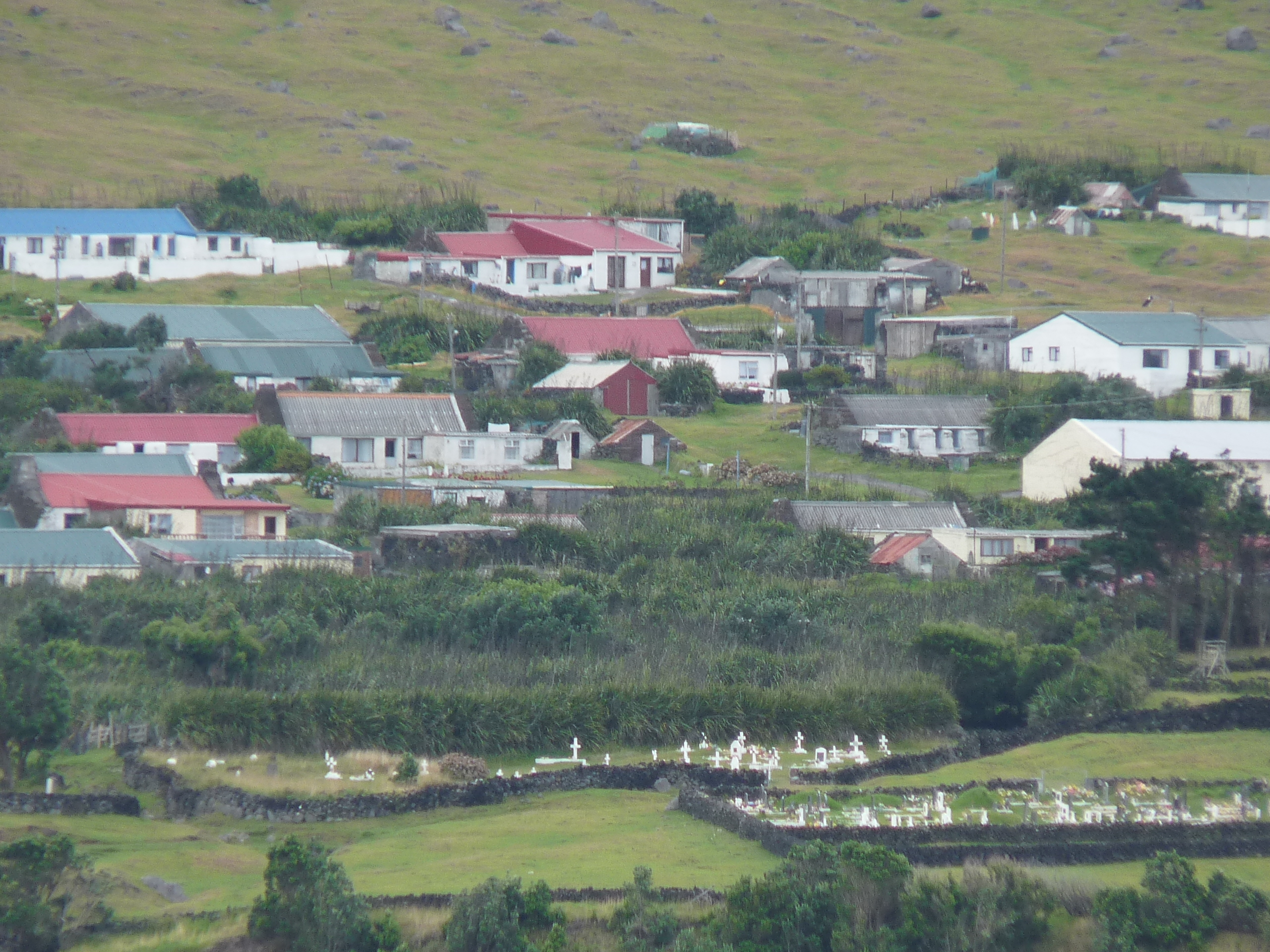
Eastern ESS, with the cemetery in the foreground

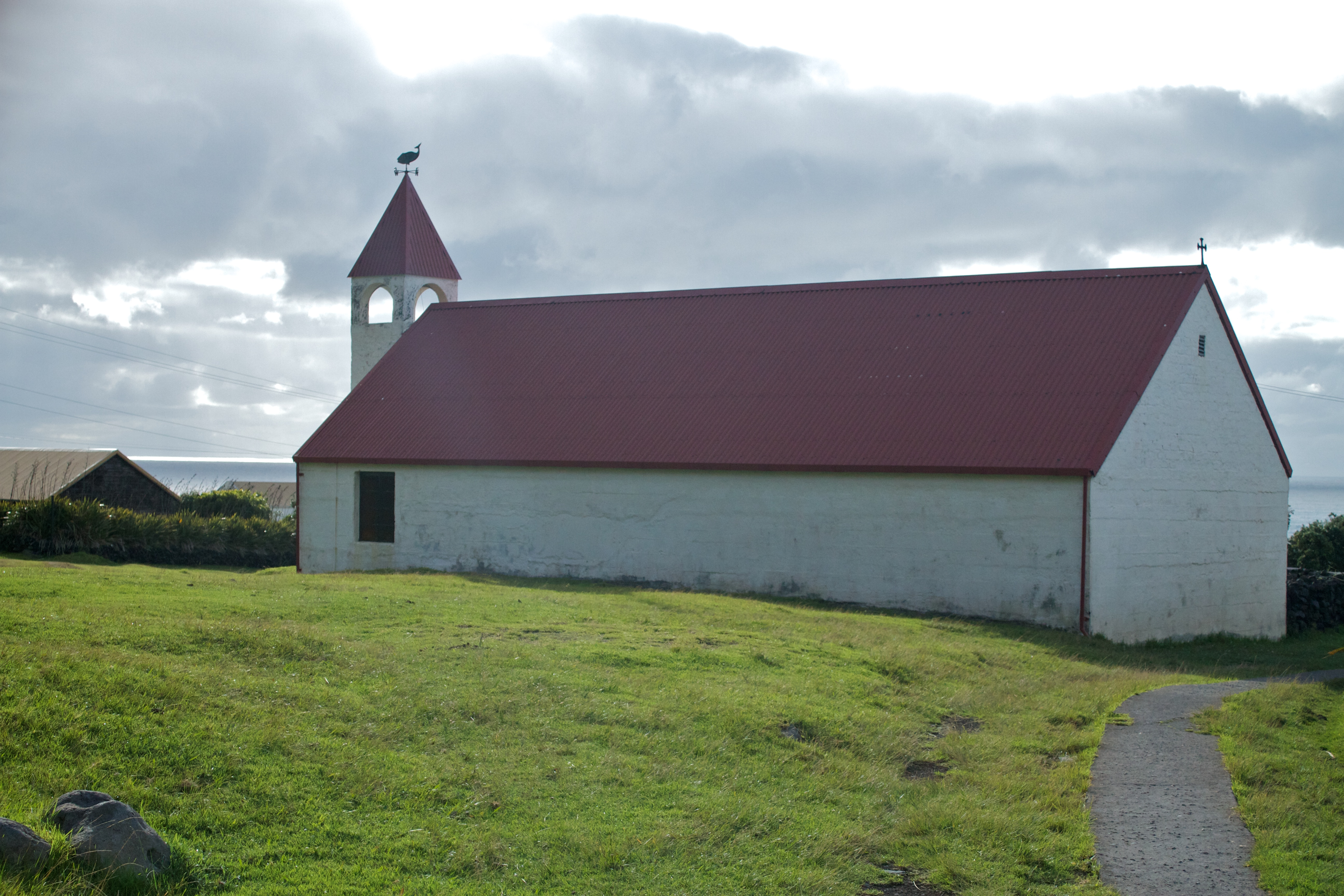
St Joseph Catholic Church

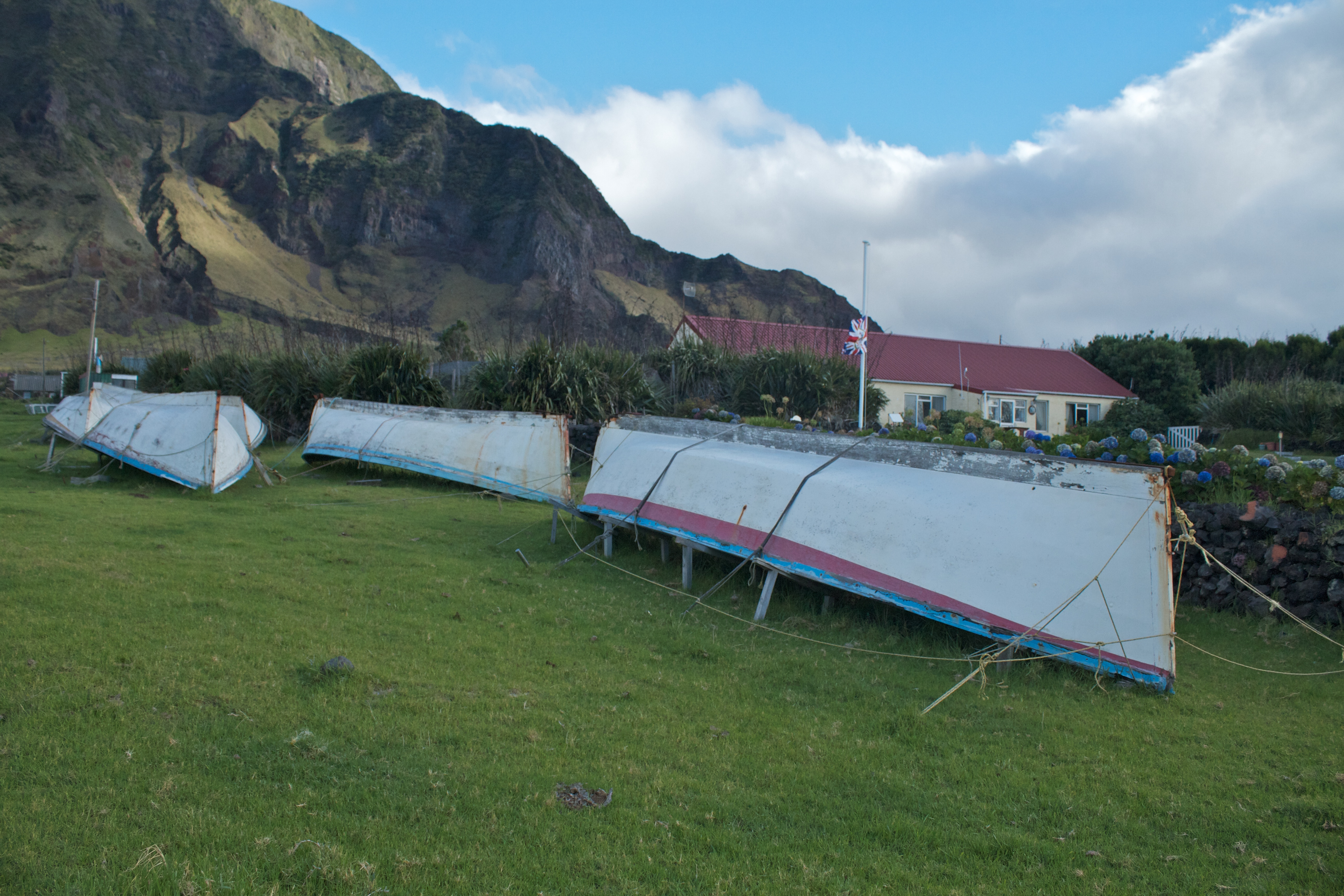
Longboats in front of the administrator's residence

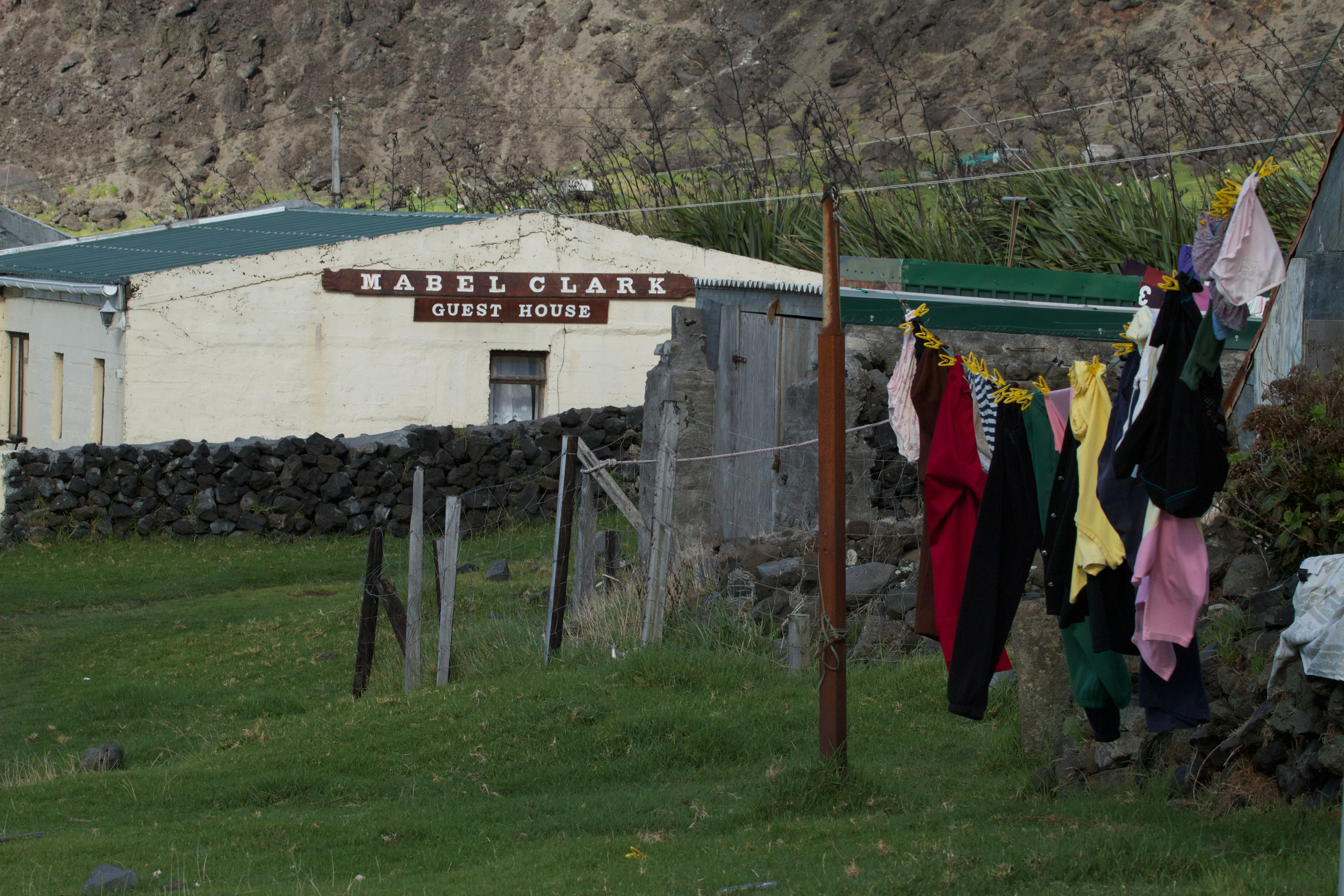
The Mabel Clark Guest House, used to house visitors

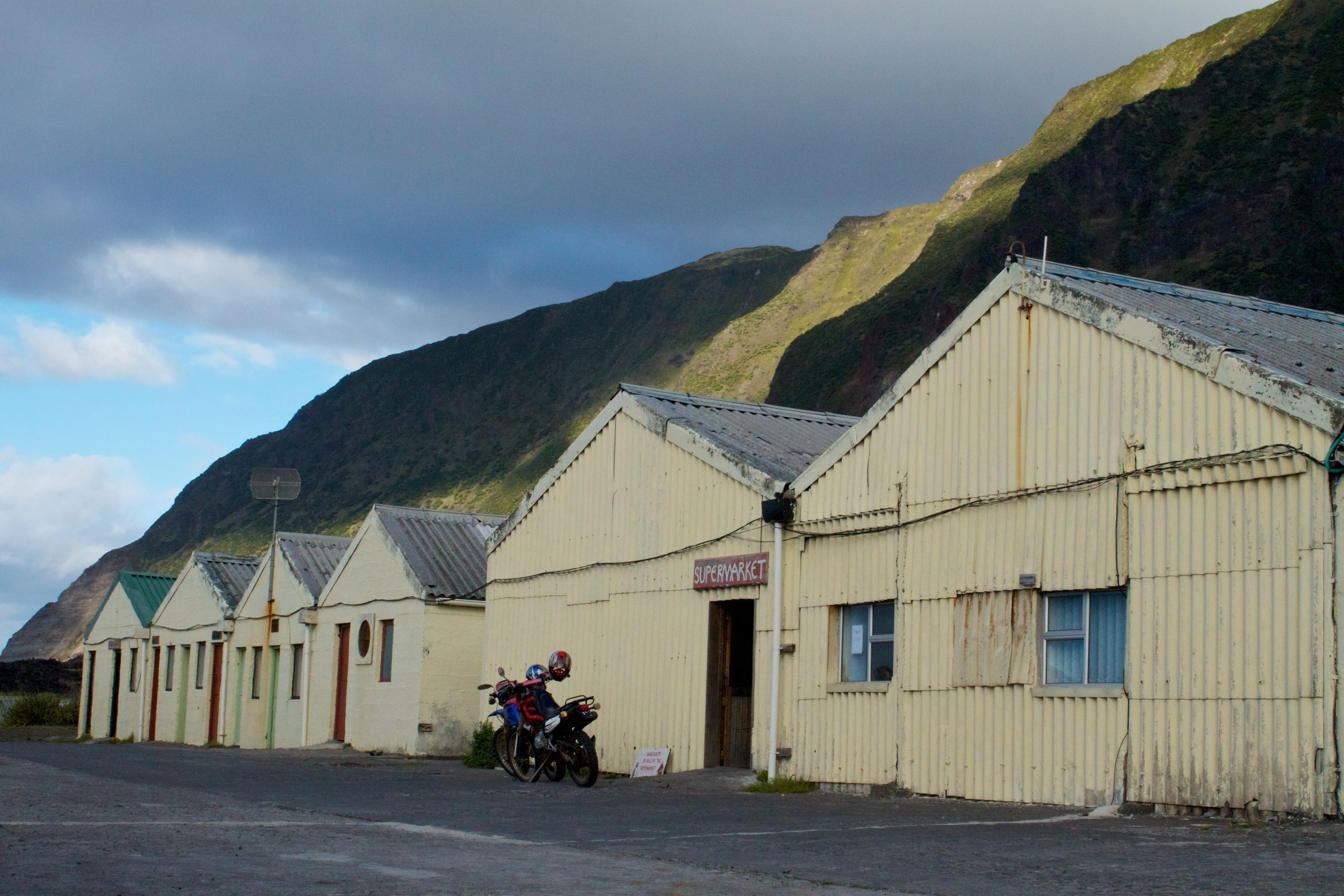
Tristan Island Store, the island's only supermarket

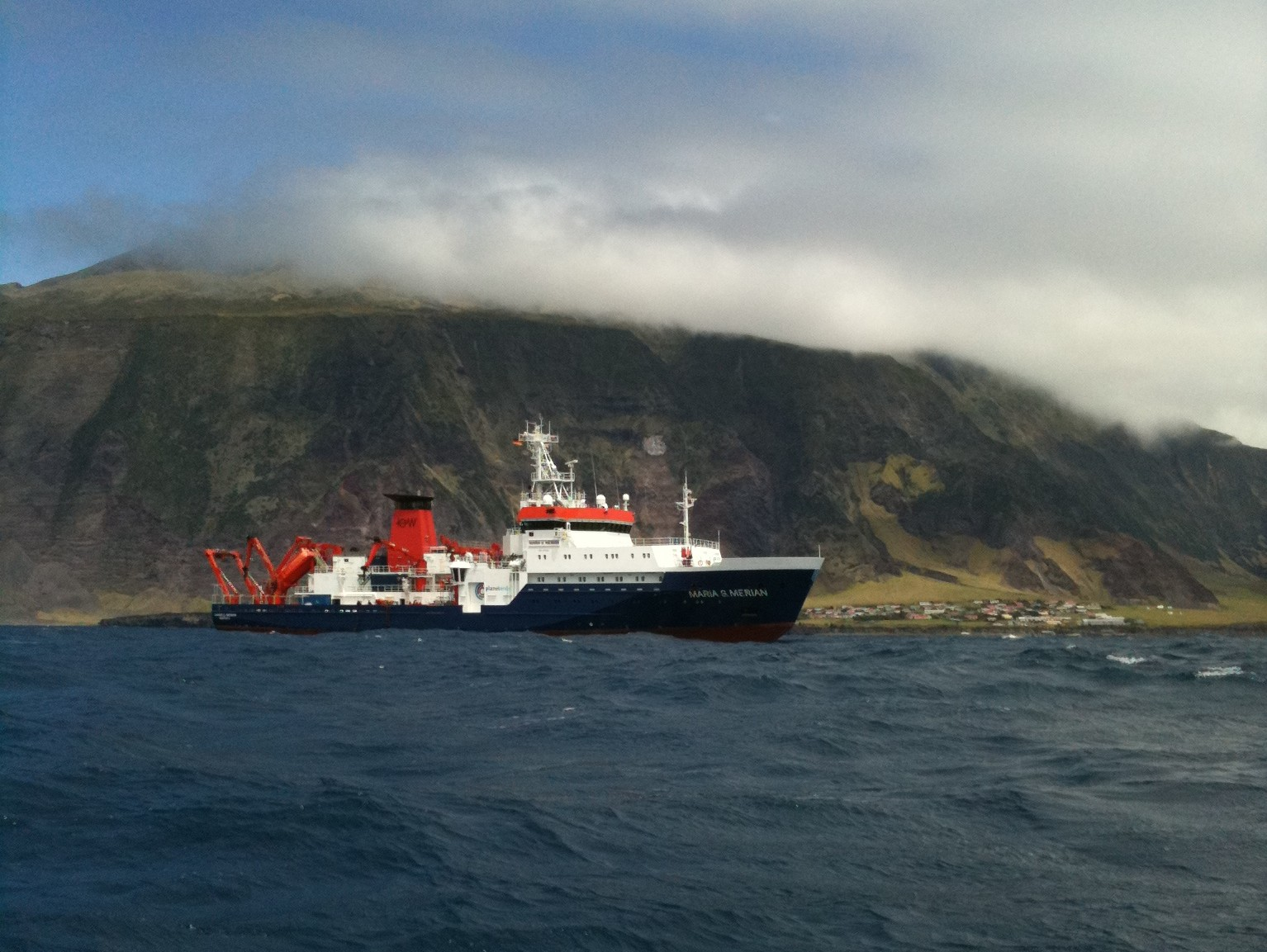
RV Maria S. Merian, a German research vessel

== Notable people ==
- William Glass (1786–1853), founder of the settlement
- Harold Green (1934–2025), first Chief Islander
- Lewis Glass (1948–2019), former Chief Islander
- Anne Green (born 1952), the first woman to be elected Chief Islander; she served in that role 1988–91 and 2003–07
- Conrad Glass (born 1961), police officer
- James Glass (born 1961), Chief Islander, brother of Anne Green
