= Tristan da Cunha lifeboat disaster =

1885 Maritime Disaster

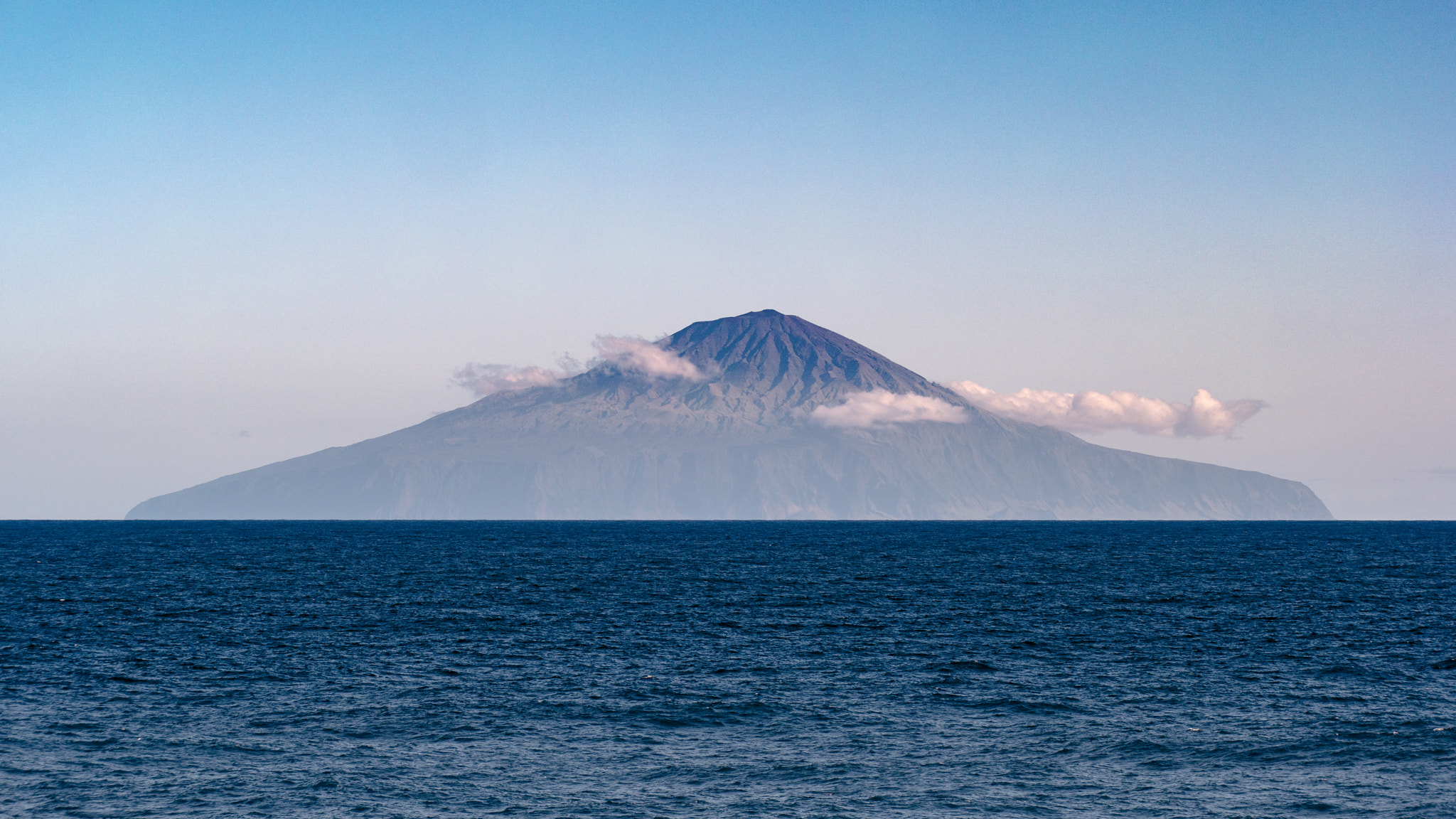
- The shores of Tristan da Cunha
- Date: 27 November 1885
- Location: Atlantic Ocean; 37.062141°S 12.312739°W
- Deaths: 15 (presumed)

The Tristan da Cunha lifeboat disaster, which occurred on 27 November 1885, was a tragedy which saw the island of Tristan da Cunha suffer its biggest loss of life during a single event.

== Event ==
Victims of the 1885 Lifeboat disaster:

- Joe Beetham
- Thomas & Cornelius Cotton
- Thomas Glass
- John, William & Alfred Green
- Jacob, William & Jeremiah Green
- Albert, James & William Hagan
- Samuel & Thomas Swain

On 27 November 1885, an iron barque named West Riding approached Tristan da Cunha. The vessel had originated in Bristol, England and was en route to Sydney, Australia. During this time, the island had lost regular trading opportunities which caused the majority of the able-bodied men on the island to board a lifeboat to make contact with the vessel. The lifeboat had been recently donated by the British Government, and although conditions in the South Atlantic Ocean appeared rough, the men sailed and the lifeboat was spotted sailing alongside the West Riding vessel for some time.

The lifeboat, and the men on board, never returned to the island. The ultimate fate of the men has never been proven, a number of theories have been given, such as the men drowning, to reports of them being taken to Australia to be sold as slaves. In total, 15 men were lost, leaving behind a number of widows on the island. One of the victims, Thomas Glass, was the son of William Glass, founder of the island's settlement Edinburgh of the Seven Seas.

== Commemorations ==
A plaque at St Mary's Church in Edinburgh of the Seven Seas commemorates the lost men. On 27 November 2015, Tristan da Cunha issued stamps to commemorate the 130th anniversary of the disaster.
