= Anne Green (Chief Islander) =

Tristanian teacher and politician (born 1952)

- Born: March 21, 1952 (age 74)
- Occupation: Teacher
- Known for: First female Chief Islander of Tristan da Cunha
- Title: MBE
- Children: Iris Green

Anne Green MBE (born 21 March 1952) is a Tristanian teacher, politician and public administrator from Tristan da Cunha, a remote island in the southern Atlantic Ocean that is part of the British overseas territory of Saint Helena, Ascension and Tristan da Cunha. She was the first woman to be elected Chief Islander (serving twice in the office) and also the first woman to be Acting Administrator of the island.

== Career ==
Anne Violet Green (née Glass) was born on 21 March 1952 to Wilson Glass (son of Robert Glass, who in turn was the grandson of Tristan founder William Glass through his son Thomas, and Charlotte Swain). She married Joseph Green (born 1947); professionally, she is a teacher and practises on the island of Tristan da Cunha, culminating in her appointment as Headteacher at St Mary's School.

In the island's politics, Green has served as elected Chief Islander for Tristan da Cunha twice, between 1988 and 1991 and again between 2003 and 2007; she was the first woman to hold that office when elected in 1988; in 2003, she succeeded her brother, James Glass. She also became the first woman to act as the island's Administrator, when she did so in an interim capacity when the Administrator went on leave at various times from 2003 to 2007.

Along with her brother James Glass, Green has written a book, A Short Guide to Tristan da Cunha, which was published in 2003.
