= James Glass (Chief Islander) =

Tristanian politician (born 1961)

James Patrick Glass MBE (born 20 January 1961) is a Tristanian politician who has served as Tristan da Cunha's Chief Islander for a record five times.

He was appointed a Member of the Order of the British Empire during the 2023 New Year Honours. In May 2023 he attended the coronation of Charles III.

== Family ==
Glass was born in Stanley in the Falkland Islands on 20 January 1961 to Wilson Martyn Charlton Glass and Maria (Rogers). His father was the son of Robert Franklin Glass, son of Thomas Jordan Glass, a casualty of the 1885 Tristan da Cunha lifeboat disaster, and son of William Glass, founder of Edinburgh of the Seven Seas.

Glass is the brother of Anne Green, former Chief Islander.
