= List of birds of Tristan da Cunha =

Location of Tristan da Cunha

This is a list of the bird species recorded in Tristan da Cunha. The avifauna of Tristan da Cunha include a total of 93 species, of which 8 are endemic, and one is extinct.

This list's taxonomic treatment (designation and sequence of orders, families and species) and nomenclature (common and scientific names) follow the conventions of The Clements Checklist of Birds of the World, 2022 edition.

The following tags have been used to categorise some species:

- (A) Accidental - a species that rarely or accidentally occurs in Tristan da Cunha
- (E) Endemic - a species endemic to Tristan da Cunha
- (Ex) Extinct - a species that no longer exists

== Ducks, geese, and waterfowl ==
Order: Anseriformes Family: Anatidae

Includes all but four species of Anseriformes. They are excellent at an aquatic life thanks to an oily covering on their feathers.

- Yellow-billed teal, Anas flavirostris (A)

== Cuckoos ==
Order: Cuculiformes Family: Cuculidae

Cuckoos are found almost worldwide. They are highly variable in size, shape, colour, and habits.

- Yellow-billed cuckoo, Coccyzus americanus (A)

== Nightjars and allies ==
Order: Caprimulgiformes Family: Caprimulgidae

Nighthawks belong to the same family as nightjars but are found only in the Americas. They have mottled or striped plumage for camouflage.

- Common nighthawk, Chordeiles minor (A)

== Rails, gallinules, and coots ==
Order: Gruiformes Family: Rallidae

Rails are usually secretive birds. Many island species are flightless and many of those have gone extinct in the last five centuries. Gallinules are less secretive, and are usually found near or on water.

- Inaccessible Island rail, Atlantisia rogersi (E)
- Paint-billed crake, Neocrex erythrops (A)
- Tristan moorhen, Gallinula nesiotis (Ex)
- Gough moorhen, Gallinula comeri (E)
- Red-gartered coot, Fulica armillata (A)
- Purple gallinule, Porphyrio martinicus (A)

== Sheathbills ==
Order: Charadriiformes Family: Chionididae

The sheathbills are scavengers of the Antarctic regions. They have white plumage and look plump and dove-like but are believed to be similar to the ancestors of the modern gulls and terns.

- Snowy sheathbill, Chionis albus (A)

== Plovers and lapwings ==
Order: Charadriiformes Family: Charadriidae

Plovers are small to medium-sized wading birds found worldwide, which live both on coasts and inland. Two species have been recorded in Tristan da Cunha.

- Common ringed plover, Charadrius hiaticula (A)
- Rufous-chested dotterel, Charadrius modestus (A)

== Sandpipers and allies ==
Order: Charadriiformes Family: Scolopacidae

Scolopacidae is a large diverse family of small to medium-sized shorebirds including the sandpipers, curlews, godwits, shanks, tattlers, woodcocks, snipes, dowitchers and phalaropes. The majority of these species eat small invertebrates picked out of the mud or soil.

- Upland sandpiper, Bartramia longicauda (A)
- Whimbrel, Numenius phaeopus (A)
- Ruddy turnstone, Arenaria interpres (A)
- Sharp-tailed sandpiper, Calidris acuminata
- Sanderling, Calidris alba (A)
- White-rumped sandpiper, Calidris fuscicollis (A)
- Pectoral sandpiper, Calidris melanotos (A)
- Red phalarope, Phalaropus fulicarius (A)
- Spotted sandpiper, Actitis macularius (A)
- Solitary sandpiper, Tringa solitaria (A)
- Common greenshank, Tringa nebularia (A)
- Lesser yellowlegs, Tringa flavipes (A)

== Skuas and jaegers ==
Order: Charadriiformes Family: Stercorariidae

The family Stercorariidae are, in general, medium to large birds, typically with grey or brown plumage, often with white markings on the wings. They nest on the ground in temperate and arctic regions and are long-distance migrants.

- Chilean skua, Stercorarius chilensis (A)
- Brown skua, Stercorarius antarctica
- Parasitic jaeger, Stercorarius parasiticus (A)
- Long-tailed jaeger, Stercorarius longicaudus (A)

== Gulls, terns, and skimmers ==
Order: Charadriiformes Family: Laridae

Laridae is a family of medium to large seabirds, the gulls, terns, and skimmers. Gulls are typically grey or white, often with black markings on the head or wings. They have stout, longish bills and webbed feet. Terns are a group of generally medium to large seabirds typically with grey or white plumage, often with black markings on the head. Most terns hunt fish by diving but some pick insects off the surface of fresh water. Terns are generally long-lived birds, with several species known to live in excess of 30 years.

- Franklin's gull, Leucophaeus pipixcan (A)
- Kelp gull, Larus dominicanus (A)
- Brown noddy, Anous stolidus
- Arctic tern, Sterna paradisaea (A)
- Antarctic tern, Sterna vittata

== Tropicbirds ==
Order: Phaethontiformes Family: Phaethontidae Tropicbirds are seabirds once thought to be closely related to pelicans but now known to belong in a clade known as Metaves.

- Red-tailed tropicbird, Phaethon rubricauda (A)

== Penguins ==
Penguins are southern ocean birds with only one species north of the equator. Small to large in size and mostly black and white in colour.

- King penguin, Aptenodytes patagonicus (A)
- Gentoo penguin, Pygoscelis papua (A)
- Chinstrap penguin, Pygoscelis antarcticus (A)
- Macaroni penguin, Eudyptes chrysolophus (A)
- Southern rockhopper penguin, Eudyptes chrysocome
- Moseley's rockhopper penguin, Eudyptes moseleyi

== Albatrosses ==
Order: Procellariiformes Family: Diomedeidae

Albatrosses are large tubenoses with wingspans of more than a meter. Most are southern ocean species but some are found in the north Pacific Ocean.

- Yellow-nosed albatross, Thalassarche chlororhynchos
- Gray-headed albatross, Thalassarche chrysostoma
- White-capped albatross, Thalassarche cauta
- Salvin's albatross, Thalassarche salvini (A)
- Black-browed albatross, Thalassarche melanophris
- Sooty albatross, Phoebetria fusca
- Light-mantled albatross, Phoebetria palpebrata
- Wandering albatross, Diomedea exulans

== Southern storm-petrels ==
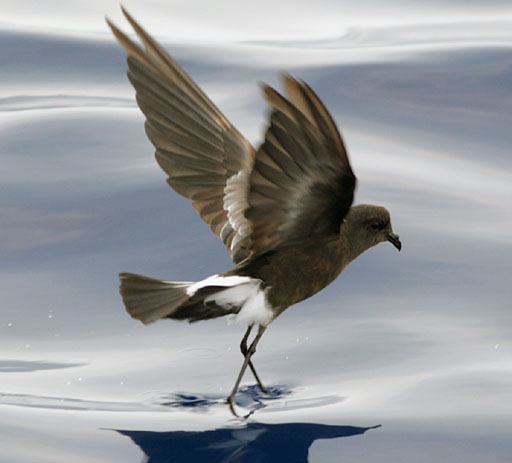
Wilson's storm-petrel

Order: Procellariiformes Family: Oceanitidae

The storm-petrels are the smallest seabirds, relatives of the petrels, feeding on planktonic crustaceans and small fish picked from the surface, typically while hovering. The flight is fluttering and sometimes bat-like. Until 2018, this family's three species were included with the other storm-petrels in family Hydrobatidae.

- Wilson's storm-petrel, Oceanites oceanicus
- Gray-backed storm-petrel, Garrodia nereis
- White-faced storm-petrel, Pelagodroma marina
- White-bellied storm-petrel, Fregetta grallaria
- Black-bellied storm-petrel, Fregetta tropica

== Northern storm-petrels ==
Order: Procellariiformes Family: Hydrobatidae

Though the members of this family are similar in many respects to the southern storm-petrels, including their general appearance and habits, there are enough genetic differences to warrant their placement in a separate family.

- Leach's storm petrel, Hydrobates leucorhoa

== Petrels and shearwaters ==
Order: Procellariiformes Family: Procellariidae Petrels and shearwaters are known collectively as tubenoses for the tubes on their beaks which they use for excreting salt.

- Southern giant-petrel, Macronectes giganteus
- Northern giant-petrel, Macronectes halli
- Southern fulmar, Fulmarus glacialoides
- Cape petrel, Daption capensis
- Kerguelen petrel, Aphrodroma brevirostris
- Great-winged petrel, Pterodroma macroptera
- Soft-plumaged petrel, Pterodroma mollis
- White-headed petrel, Pterodroma lessonii
- Juan Fernandez petrel, Pterodroma externa
- Atlantic petrel, Pterodroma incerta
- Blue petrel, Halobaena caerulea (A)
- Broad-billed prion, Pachyptila vittata
- MacGillivray's prion, Pachyptila macgillivrayi
- Antarctic prion, Pachyptila desolata
- Slender-billed prion, Pachyptila belcheri
- Gray petrel, Procellaria cinerea
- White-chinned petrel, Procellaria aequinoctialis
- Spectacled petrel, Procellaria conspicillata
- Cory's shearwater, Calonectris diomedea (A)
- Great shearwater, Ardenna gravis
- Sooty shearwater, Ardenna grisea
- Subantarctic shearwater, Puffinus elegans
- Tropical shearwater, Puffinus bailloni
- Common diving-petrel, Pelecanoides urinatrix

== Herons, egrets, and bitterns ==
Order: Pelecaniformes Family: Ardeidae Herons are long-necked long-legged water birds. The majority feed on fish and other pond-life. Six species have been recorded in Tristan da Cunha.

- Cocoi heron, Ardea cocoi (A)
- Great egret, Ardea alba (A)
- Snowy egret, Egretta thula (A)
- Little blue heron, Egretta caerulea (A)
- Cattle egret, Bubulcus ibis (A)
- Striated heron, Butorides striata (A)

== Tyrant flycatchers ==
Order: Passeriformes Family: Tyrannidae

Tyrant flycatchers are Passerine birds which occur throughout North and South America. They superficially resemble the Old World flycatchers, but are more robust and have stronger bills. They do not have the sophisticated vocal capabilities of the songbirds. Most, but not all, are rather plain. As the name implies, most are insectivorous.

- Eastern kingbird, Tyrannus tyrannus (A)

== Swallows ==
Order: Passeriformes Family: Hirundinidae

The family Hirundinidae is adapted to aerial feeding. They have a slender streamlined body, long pointed wings and a short bill with a wide gape. The feet are adapted to perching rather than walking, and the front toes are partially joined at the base.

- Barn swallow, Hirundo rustica (A)
- Cliff swallow, Petrochelidon pyrrhonota (A)

== Leaf warblers ==
Order: Passeriformes Family: Phylloscopidae

This widespread family consists of small, insectivorous birds that forage mainly in trees.

- Willow warbler, Phylloscopus trochilus (A)

== Thrushes ==
Order: Passeriformes Family: Turdidae

The thrushes are a group of passerine birds that occur mainly but not exclusively in the Old World. They are plump, soft plumaged, small to medium-sized insectivores or sometimes omnivores, often feeding on the ground. Many have attractive songs.

- Tristan thrush, Turdus eremita (E)

== Tanagers ==
Order: Passeriformes Family: Thraupidae

This large family includes the true tanagers, as well as a number of other species often referred to simply as "finches", although they are not members of the true finch family.

- Gough Island finch, Rowettia goughensis (E)
- Inaccessible Island finch, Nesospiza acunhae (E)
- Nightingale Island finch, Neospiza acunhae (E)
- Wilkins's finch, Nesospiza wilkinsi (E)

== See also ==
- List of birds
- Lists of birds by region
