= Prion (disambiguation) =

Prions are misfolded proteins which characterize several fatal neurodegenerative diseases in humans and many other animals.

Prion may also refer to:

== Science ==
- Fungal prion, a prion that infects fungal hosts
- Prion protein, the human gene encoding for the major prion protein PrP (for prion protein)
- Prion diseases, a group of progressive and invariably fatal symptoms affecting the brain (encephalopathies) and nervous system of many animals
- Prion pruritus, an intense itching during the prodromal period of the Creutzfeldt–Jakob disease
- Prion pseudoknot, a predicted RNA pseudoknot structure found in prion protein mRNA
- Prion (journal), a journal on protein folding, misfolding, assembly disorders and structural inheritance

== Other uses ==
- Prion (bird)
  - List of prions
- Prion Humour Classics, a series of novels published by Prion Books in the UK
- Prion Island, located in the Bay of Isles, South Georgia
- National Prion Clinic (UK), a British specialist prion disease clinic
- Eran Prion (born 1974), Israeli musician and music producer
- Prion, Denbighshire, village in Wales
