= Priani =

Priani is a surname. Notable people with the surname include:

- Ernesto Priani (born 1962), Mexican philosopher, professor, digital humanist, digital editor
- Horacio Priani (1912-1964), Argentine film actor
- Pedro Luis Priani, 1962-63 Federal Interventor of the Chubut province, Argentina

== See also ==
- Prion (disambiguation)
