= Gonçalo Álvares =

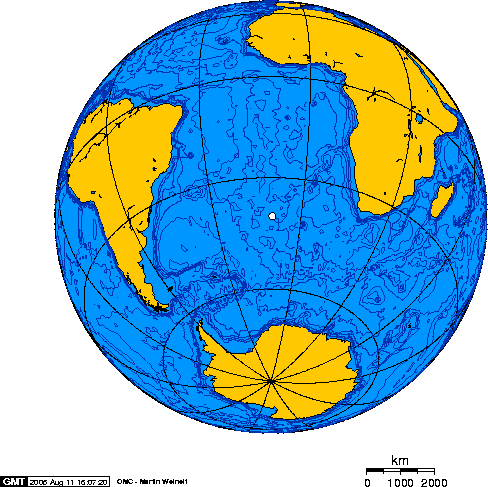
Orthographic projection over Gough Island

Gonçalo Álvares (Portuguese pronunciation: [gõˈsalu ˈalvɐɾɨʃ], ?? – 1524) was a Portuguese explorer who actively participated in the Age of Discovery, starting from the second voyage of Diogo Cão.

In 1497 he commanded the ship São Gabriel in the epic journey of Vasco da Gama to India, and in 1505, aboard the fleet of Francisco de Almeida – the first Viceroy of Portuguese India – he sailed south in the Atlantic to where "water and even wine froze", and discovered an island that was named after him. It was later renamed Gough Island by the British, who took possession in the nineteenth century.

Gonçalo Álvares held the office of chief-pilot of the navigation to India and the Ocean Sea until his death in 1524.
