= List of prions =

This is a list of the genera, species, and subspecies belonging to the prions, which belong to the Procellariiformes.

== Pachyptila ==
- Pachyptila turtur, fairy prion breeds on subtropical and subantarctic islands
- Pachyptila belcheri, slender-billed prion breeds on Kerguelen Island, Crozet Island, Falkland Islands, and Noir Island
- Pachyptila crassirostris, fulmar prion breeds on Auckland Island, Snares Island, Bounty Islands, Chatham Island, New Zealand, and Heard Island
  - Pachyptila crassirostris crassirostris breeds on Snares Island, Bounty Islands, and Chatham Island, New Zealand
  - Pachyptila crassirostris eatoni breeds on Heard Island and Auckland Island
- Pachyptila vittata, broad-billed prion breeds on islands off of New Zealand and Tristan da Cunha group
- Pachyptila desolata, Antarctic prion breeds on Crozet Island, Kerguelen Island, Macquarie Island, Auckland Island, Heard Island, Scott Island, South Georgia Island, South Sandwich Islands, and the Scotia Arc
  - Pachyptila desolata desolata breeds on Crozet Island, Kerguelen Island, and Macquarie Island
  - Pachyptila desolata altera breeds on Auckland Island and Heard Island
  - Pachyptila desolata banksi breeds on South Georgia Island, South Sandwich Islands, Scott Island, and the Scotia Arc
- Pachyptila salvini, Salvin's prion breeds on Prince Edward Islands and Crozet Island
- Pachyptila macgillivrayi, MacGillivray's prion breeds on St. Paul Island and Gough Island

== Halobaena ==
- Halobaena caerulea, blue petrel breeds on islands in the southern Subantarctic islands and the islands off the coast of Cape Horn
