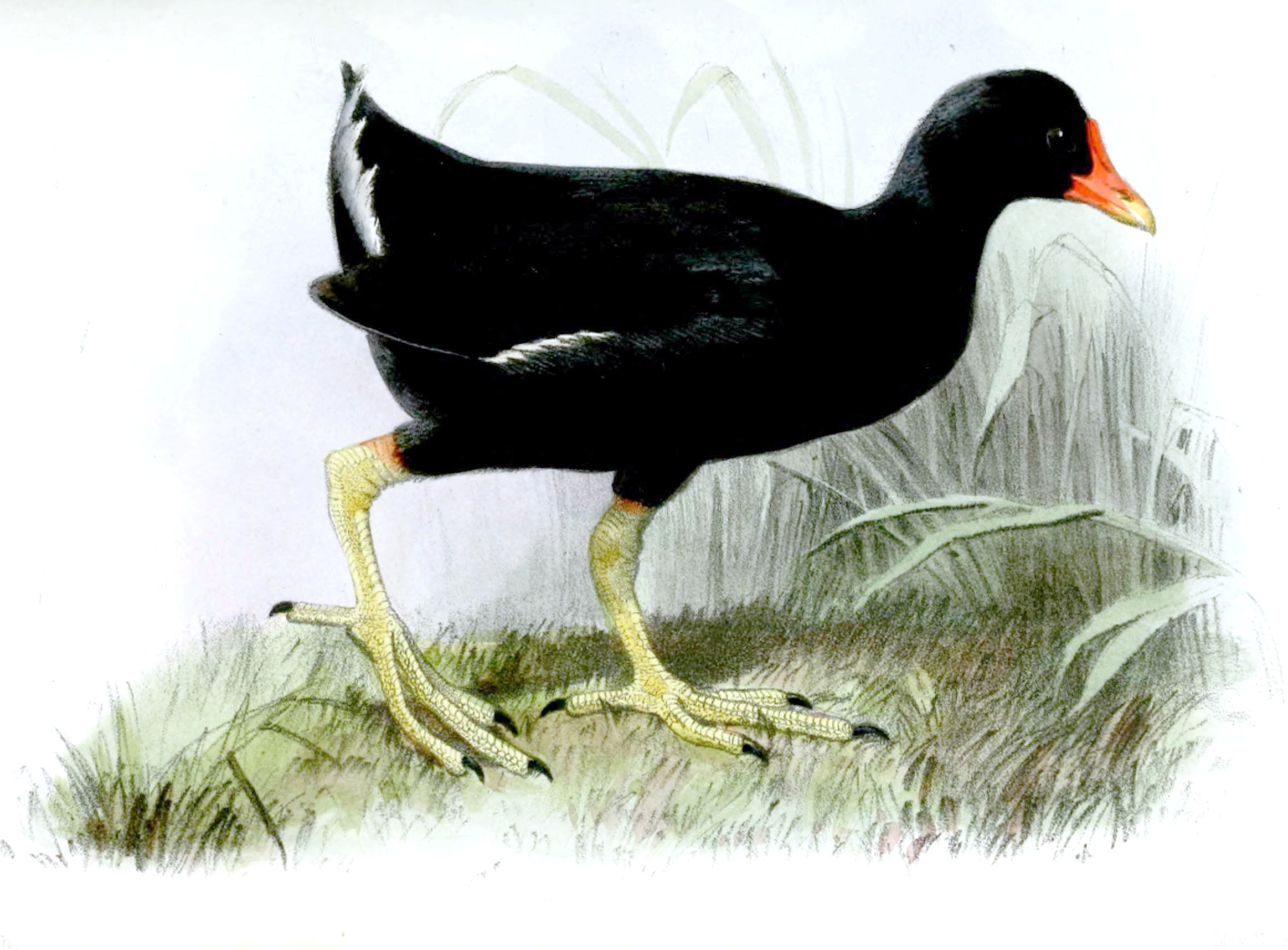
- Tristan moorhen

Conservation status
- Extinct (late 19th century) (IUCN 3.1)

Scientific classification
- Kingdom: Animalia
- Phylum: Chordata
- Class: Aves
- Order: Gruiformes
- Family: Rallidae
- Genus: Gallinula
- Species: †G. nesiotis

Binomial name
- †Gallinula nesiotis Sclater, PL, 1861

= Tristan moorhen =

Extinct species of bird

The Tristan moorhen or Tristan gallinule (Gallinula nesiotis) is an extinct species of flightless rail endemic to the South Atlantic island of Tristan da Cunha. It was very similar to the Gough moorhen of Gough Island, located 636 kilometres (395 mi) to the southeast.

The once abundant Tristan moorhen had become rare by 1873, and by the end of 19th century it was extinct as a result of hunting, predation by introduced species (rats, cats and pigs) and habitat destruction by fire. A handful of taxidermied specimens of the Tristan moorhen have been preserved.

In 1956 the closely related Gough moorhen G. comeri was introduced to Tristan da Cunha, under the then belief it was a reintroduction of the same species. On the basis of DNA sequencing of both recently collected and historical material from both species, Groenenberg et al (2008) concluded that the genetic distances between G. nesiotis and G. comeri are of at least the same size as those found between subspecies of G. chloropus in the literature. They propose that the extinct moorhen of Tristan (Gallinula nesiotis) and the moorhens that live on Gough and Tristan today (G. comeri) be regarded as subspecies: Gallinula nesiotis nesiotis and Gallinula nesiotis gomeri.
