= 1955 Gough Expedition =

Research expedition

- Location: Gough Island
- Goal: cartographic work

The 1955 Gough Island Scientific Survey was a scientific expedition undertaken in 1955 through 1956 from England to Gough Island in the South Atlantic Ocean. The expedition’s purpose was to study various aspects of the island's flora and fauna and to perform geological and cartographic surveys. It was led by John B. Heaney. The book "Mountains in the Sea" was written by one of the expedition crew about the expedition.

== Origins ==
The expedition started after a suggestion from Dr. B.B. Roberts of the Scott Polar Research Institute. Other team members were sourced from British universities, except for J.J. van der Merwe of South Africa. Funding came from the Scott Polar Research Institute, the Royal Geographical Society, the Prince Philip, Duke of Edinburgh and others.

R.J.H. Chambers took over as leader of the expedition after doctors persuaded John Heaney to remain in England for his health.

== Expedition ==
The expedition sailed from Britain to South Africa, and from there to Tristan. There, they stayed for some time until there was a sufficient weather window. They saw local dances and attempted to summit the mountain. They landed on October 1, 1955.

After six weeks they found a weather window to come to Gough. As they attempted landing, R.J.H. Chambers suffered a suspected spinal injury and had to be removed from the expedition and shipped back to Capetown. M. Holdgate then took over as leader of the expedition.

On May 13, 1956 the frigate Transvaal took the remaining expeditionary members off of Gough.

== Results ==
The expedition resulted in a mapping of the internal hills of Gough Island for the first time. As well, at least one species was described which was new to science, Joeropsis vibicaria. The crew also recorded 27 species of ferns and 35 species of flowering plant, as well as 95 invertebrates.

They noted one land-based mammal, the house mouse, which they concluded was introduced by sealers.

The expedition base is now used as a South African Weather Station.
