= National Prion Clinic (UK) =

Clinic in the United Kingdom

The National Prion Clinic (UK) is part of the University College London Hospitals NHS Foundation Trust. Its aim is to diagnose and treat patients with any form of human prion disease (Creutzfeldt-Jakob disease, CJD). In addition, the clinic facilitates research in diagnostics and therapeutics, organises clinical trials, and counsels those with an increased genetic risk of the disease.CJD is a degenerative brain disorder that is always fatal. In the 1990s, some people in the United Kingdom developed a variant of the disease after eating meat from diseased cattle. All types of CJD are serious, but very rare.

== History ==
Prion diseases comprise Creutzfeldt–Jakob disease (CJD), Gerstmann–Sträussler–Scheinker syndrome, fatal familial insomnia and related disorders. A specialist prion disease clinic was established by Professor John Collinge at St Mary's Hospital, London, in 1997. This was designated the NHS National Prion Clinic (NPC) in March 2001 by the UK Department of Health. In August 2004, following the relocation of the Medical Research Council (MRC) Prion Unit from Imperial College to University College London (UCL), the NPC relocated to the National Hospital for Neurology and Neurosurgery at Queen Square, part of the University College London Hospitals NHS Foundation Trust. The NPC is closely integrated with the MRC Prion Unit, a relationship of fundamental importance to the missions of both organisations. The NPC receives UK-wide and international referrals of all forms of suspected CJD or other prion diseases. It is internationally unique and has developed considerable experience in the clinical management of prion disease.

In addition to providing a national NHS centre of expertise for the management of all forms of CJD and other prion diseases, the clinic was established to facilitate research in both diagnostics and therapeutics including the organisation of clinical trials. The Health Services Director at the NHS Executive wrote to all UK hospitals to inform them of the clinic, and encourage referral to it. The clinic liaises closely with the National CJD Surveillance Unit in Edinburgh, Scotland (NCJDSU) to ensure that both centres are aware of all UK prion disease patients.

== Referrals and staff ==
Aside from patients with Creutzfeldt–Jakob disease and other prion diseases, referrals are welcome of healthy but at-risk individuals from families with inherited prion disease. With some of these large pedigrees a clinical relationship has been fostered for around two decades since mutations in the prion protein gene and their use in diagnosis and genetic counseling were first reported from 1989. Through collaboration with the UK Health Protection Agency referrals are received from individuals at risk of variant Creutzfeldt–Jakob disease through blood transfusion.

In 2020 the clinic staff comprise consultant neurologists Professor John Collinge, Professor Simon Mead and Dr Peter Rudge, Clinical Research Fellows, Senior Clinical Psychologist, Lead Nurse, Clinical Nurse Specialists a Cohort Manager and administrator.
