= Ernesto Priani =

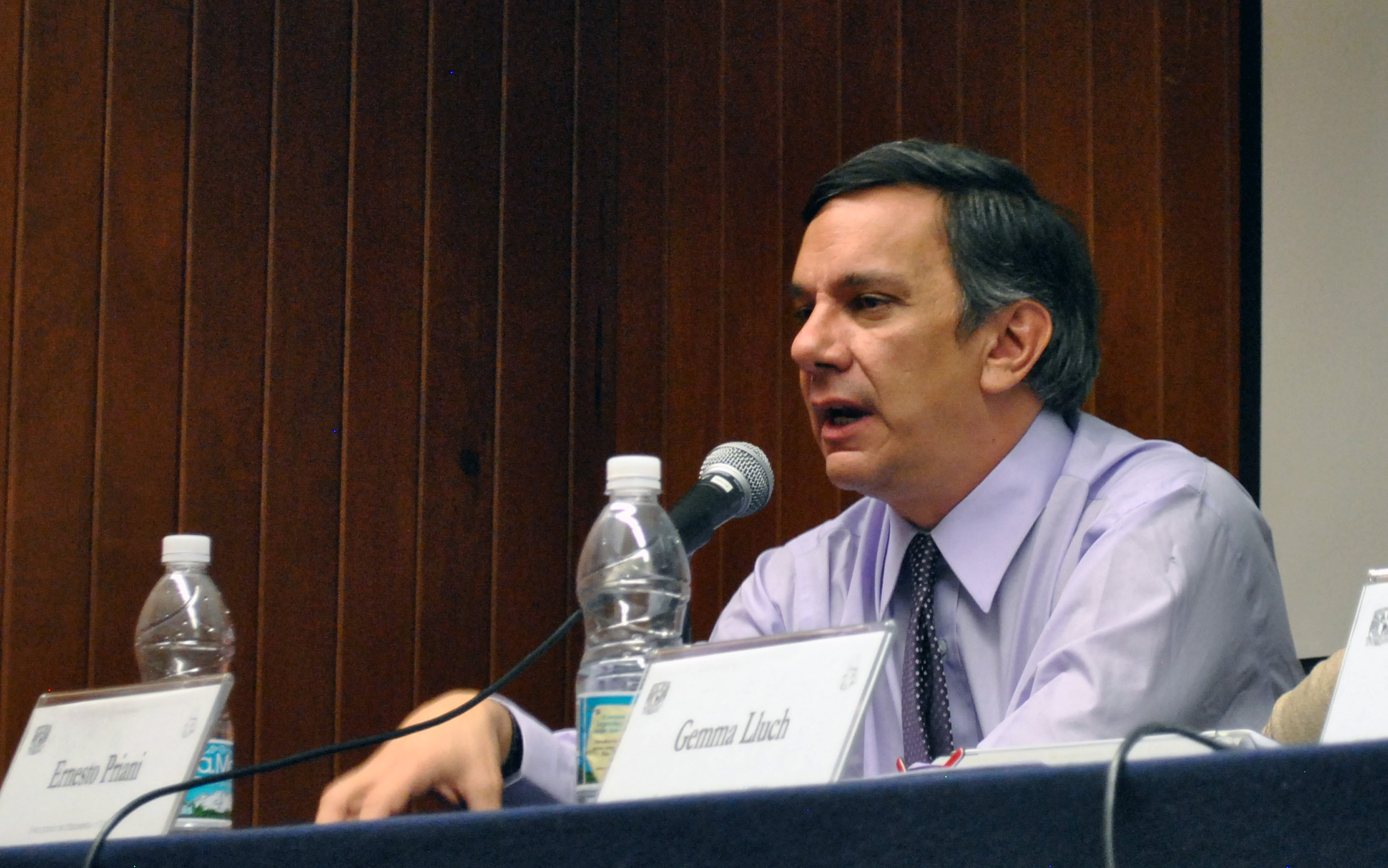
- Born: May 2, 1962 (age 63); Mexico City
- Occupation: professor
- Employer: National Autonomous University of Mexico

Ernesto Priani (9 May 1962 Mexico City) is a philosopher, professor, digital humanist, and digital editor.

Priani is currently a professor at the Faculty of Philosophy and Letters of the National Autonomous University of Mexico, vice president of Digital Humanists Network, and founder of Club Wikipedia.

Priani divides his philosophical work between the history of medieval and Renaissance thought and ethics.

== Life ==
Priani was born in Mexico City. He received undergraduate, master's and doctorate in philosophy at the Faculty of Philosophy and Letters of the National Autonomous University of Mexico, obtaining this last degree with honors in 1998.

== Works ==
Books

- De espíritus y fantasmas. Teoría de la sensibilidad y ética en el renacimiento. México: Edere, 2003.
- El libro del placer. Barcelona: Azul editorial, 1999. ISBN 9788493044091
- Magia y Hermetismo. Barcelona: Azul editorial, 1999. ISBN 9789687860220

Editor

- Historia de las doctrinas filosóficas. México: Pearson, 2009
- Pensamiento y arte en el Renacimiento. México: Facultad de Filosofía y Letras, UNAM, 2005. (con Arturo Chavolla)
- Giovanni Pico Della Mirandola. Su pensamiento, influencias y repercusiones. México: Facultad de Filosofía y Letras, UNAM, 2012.
- Irving Samadhi Aguilar Rocha (Ed) Filosofía: competencias, aprendizaje, vida, Pearson, 2012, ISBN 9786073210515
- Elisabetta Di Castro; Guillermo Hurtado (2003). "Creacion filosofica y academia". Organizacion Industrial. Teoria Y Aplicaciones Al Caso Mexicano. UNAM. pp. 109–. ISBN 978-968-36-9789-9.

Papers

- "Las Humanidades Digitales: Nuevos lenguajes para la interpretación del mundo", en Gaceta de la Universidad Veracruzana, Enero-Marzo 121, 2012.
- “Finding support for disruption. Developing a digital humanities project in México”, en ASLIB Proceedings, en 2011.
- “Criterios de evaluación de publicaciones digitales”, en Revista Digital Universitaria, 2010.
- “Filosofía del renacimiento”, en Revista Digital Universitaria, 2010.
- “Où trouver des livres anciens dans les bibliothèques mexicanes”, en Nouvelles du Livre Ancien, 2010.
- “Revista Digital Universitaria: facing the challenges of digital publishing in Mexico”, en Storicamente Tecnostoria, 2008.
- “Del enigma a la pregunta. Un análisis del cuento del grial dentro de la historia de la filosofía”, en Semiosis, Veracruz University, 2008.
