= Prion pruritus =

Itching caused by Creutzfeldt-Jakob disease

Prion pruritus is the intense itching during the prodromal period of the Creutzfeldt–Jakob disease.

== See also ==
- Pruritus
