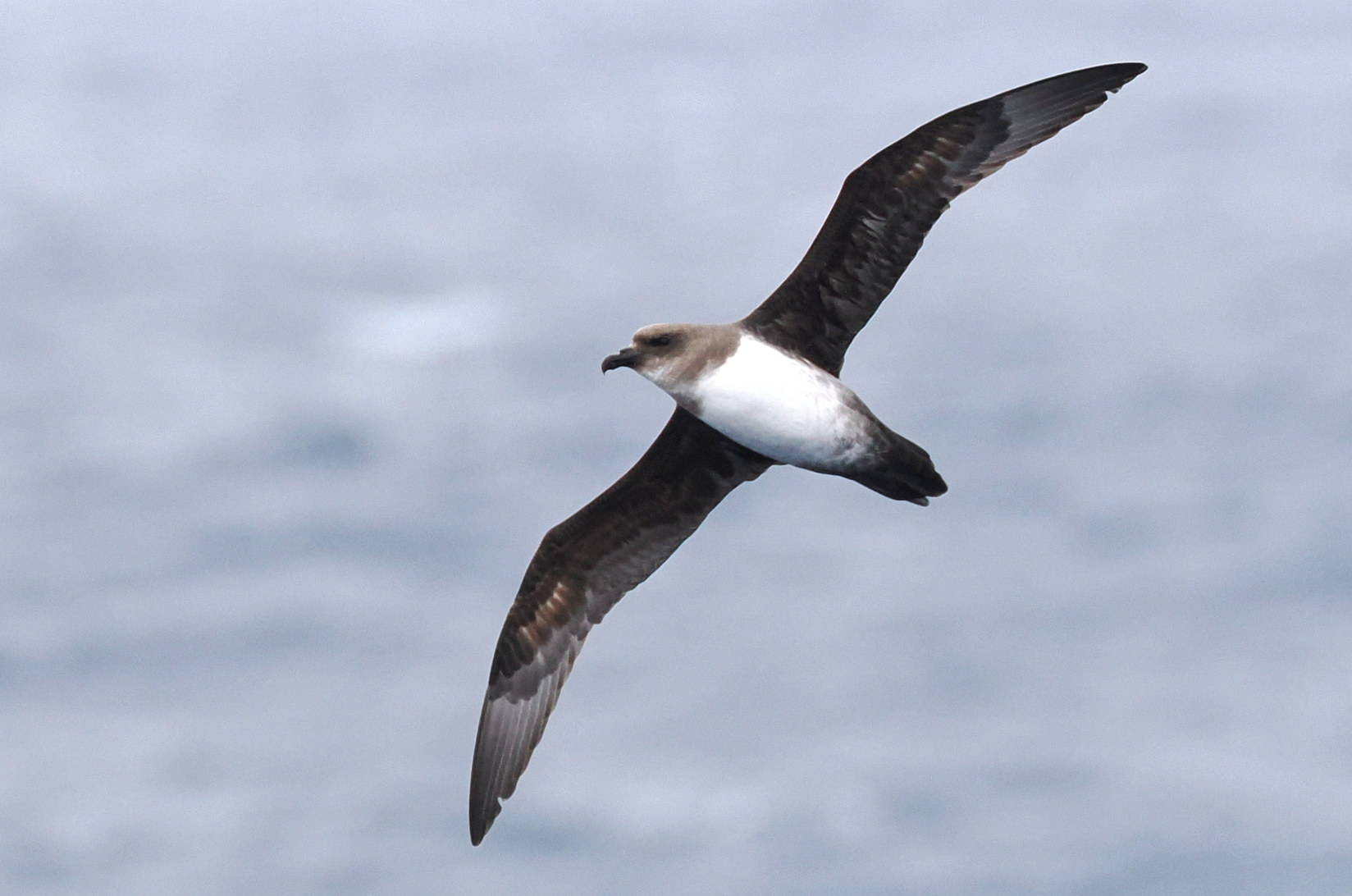

Conservation status
- Endangered (IUCN 3.1)

Scientific classification
- Kingdom: Animalia
- Phylum: Chordata
- Class: Aves
- Order: Procellariiformes
- Family: Procellariidae
- Genus: Pterodroma
- Species: P. incerta

Binomial name
- Pterodroma incerta (Schlegel, 1863)

= Atlantic petrel =

Species of bird

The Atlantic petrel (Pterodroma incerta) is a gadfly petrel endemic to the South Atlantic Ocean. It breeds in enormous colonies on Tristan da Cunha and Gough Island, and ranges at sea from Brazil to Namibia, with most records at sea being to the west of the breeding islands, and along the subtropical convergence. Adults are about 43 cm long, powerful, large, stocky, dark in color with white belly. Their head can appear to be grey in worn plumage. Brown undercoating of wings and tail. These petrels can live on average of 15 years of age.

== Population trends ==
Although the species exists in large numbers, the world population being estimated at around 5 million birds, it is listed as endangered by the IUCN. It is restricted to just two breeding islands and has declined historically due to exploitation for food. According to some studies, there are roughly 1.1 million mating pairs, but only about 25% of eggs survived. This is making their large population numbers decrease rapidly. Gough Island was the location of study, since other islands are inaccessible due to the steep cliffs. Due to reproduction mortality, this species can become locally extinct making their home range smaller.

== Habitat and ecology ==
The species feeds mostly on squid, which comprise 87% of its diet in some studies; it will also feed on lanternfishes (Myctophidae) as they ascend to the surface at night, as well as on crustaceans and some fish. This species is known for its nocturnal breeding habits. The nesting locations are between 50 and 300 meters above sea level, located on cliffsides on Gough Island and formerly, at Tristan da Cunha it was upwards of 700 meters. It nests in burrows dug in peaty soils in fern-bush vegetation.

== Predators and threats ==
The Atlantic petrel is currently threatened by introduced house mice, which prey on recently-hatched chicks. Mouse predation is particularly prevalent on Gough Island, whose mice have rapidly evolved to be about twice the size of their mainland counterparts through a phenomenon commonly known as island syndrome.

Given their small breeding range, severe hurricanes also pose an intermittent threat to breeding populations. Increasingly severe storms also threaten the availability and predictability of food sources such as squid.

== Conservation efforts ==
Starting around the 1970s, on Tristan da Cunha, they have programs to teach and learn about this species and why it is important for the ecosystem. They also educate about the dangers that the birds are facing and research ways to implement protection for them in the future. Considering their populations numbers are high, their declining population is thought to be due to the mortality rate of eggs and young. Gough Island is a nature reserve and World Heritage site, there is a field station on this island to observe the Atlantic Petrels population. Research on the House mouse is important to finding ways in reducing these predators' effect on the Atlantic Petrels.

=== Proposed actions ===
Further studies on the house mouse have focused on ways to eradicate mice on Gough Island, minimizing the risk of introducing other invasive species, and finding methods better to understand the Atlantic petrel's habits. Demographic mapping is being used to better understand the island and its animal population trends.

The petrel was formerly classified as a vulnerable species by the IUCN. However, new research revealed the severe impact of predation by mice, and the species was uplisted to endangered in 2008.
