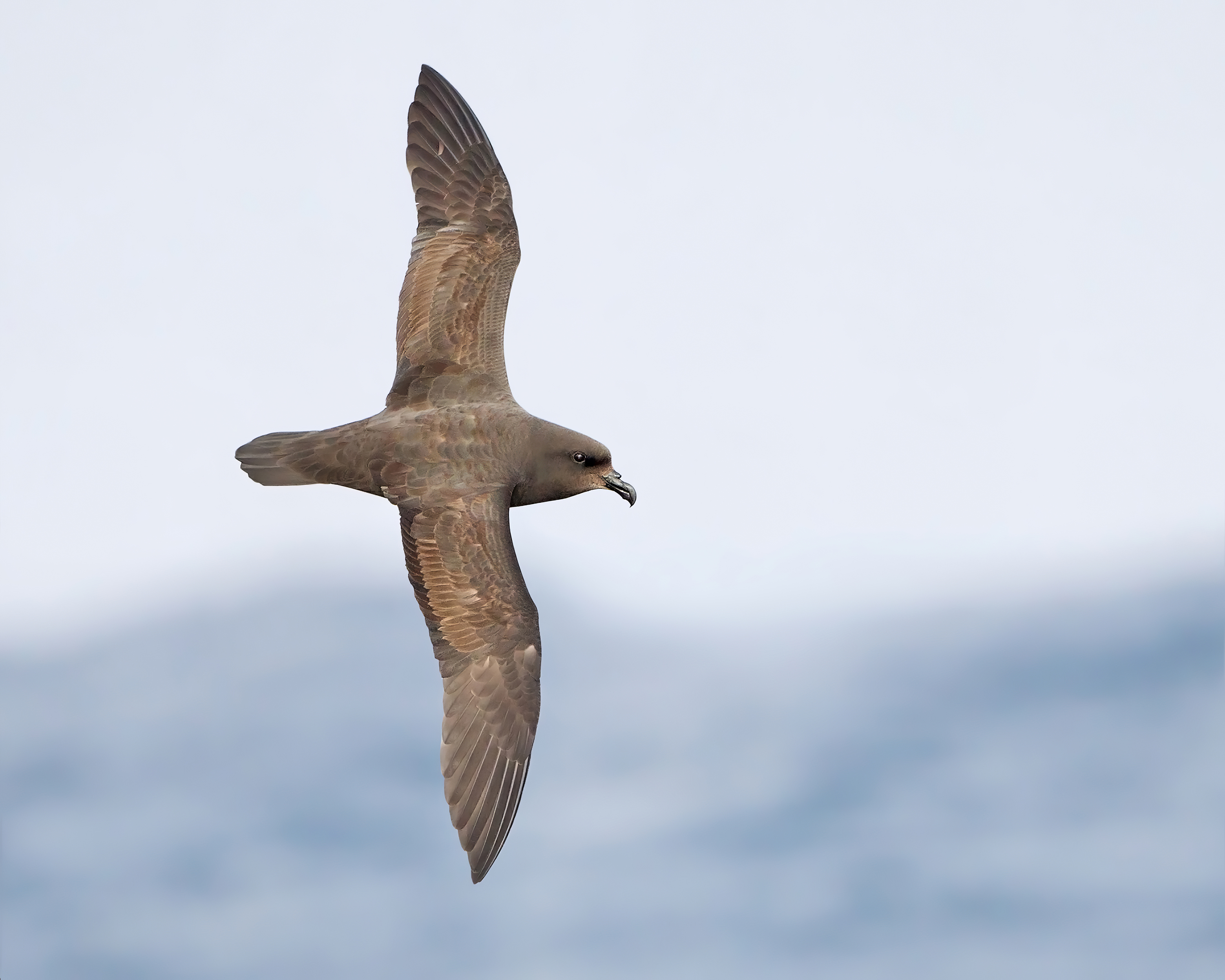

Conservation status
- Least Concern (IUCN 3.1)

Scientific classification
- Kingdom: Animalia
- Phylum: Chordata
- Class: Aves
- Order: Procellariiformes
- Family: Procellariidae
- Genus: Pterodroma
- Species: P. macroptera

Binomial name
- Pterodroma macroptera (Smith, A, 1840)

= Great-winged petrel =

Species of bird

The great-winged petrel (Pterodroma macroptera) is a petrel living and breeding in the world's Southern Ocean.

== Taxonomy ==
This species was formerly treated as containing two subspecies - P. m. macroptera and P. m. gouldi, the latter of which is endemic to New Zealand. As of 2014, the latter is recognized as a species in its own right, the grey-faced petrel (Pterodroma gouldi). In 2016 further research was published supporting the full species status of the grey-faced petrel.

== Description ==
This is a large seabird, with a body length of 42–45 cm. The bird is completely dark brown except for a variable patch of white near the base of the bill, which is black.

It is separated from sooty shearwater and short-tailed shearwater by the all-dark underwing, the thick, stubby bill, and different jizz. The similar flesh-footed shearwater has a light, pinkish bill. Petrels in the genus Procellaria are larger and have a less bounding flight.

== Distribution ==
The great-winged petrel breeds in the Southern Hemisphere between 30 and 50 degrees south with colonies on Tristan da Cunha, Gough Island, the Crozet Islands, the Prince Edward Islands, the Kerguelen Islands and on the coasts of southern Australia. It is a rare vagrant to the Pacific Ocean off the coast of California, United States.

== Ecology ==
The species feeds mostly on squid and to a lesser degree on fish and crustaceans. Prey is generally caught at night, by dipping and surface-seizing. The great-winged petrel will on occasion follow whales and associate with other related bird species to feed. Breeding occurs in the southern winter (beginning in April); nests are either solitary or in small colonies, located in burrows or aboveground among boulders or low vegetation.

== Gallery ==
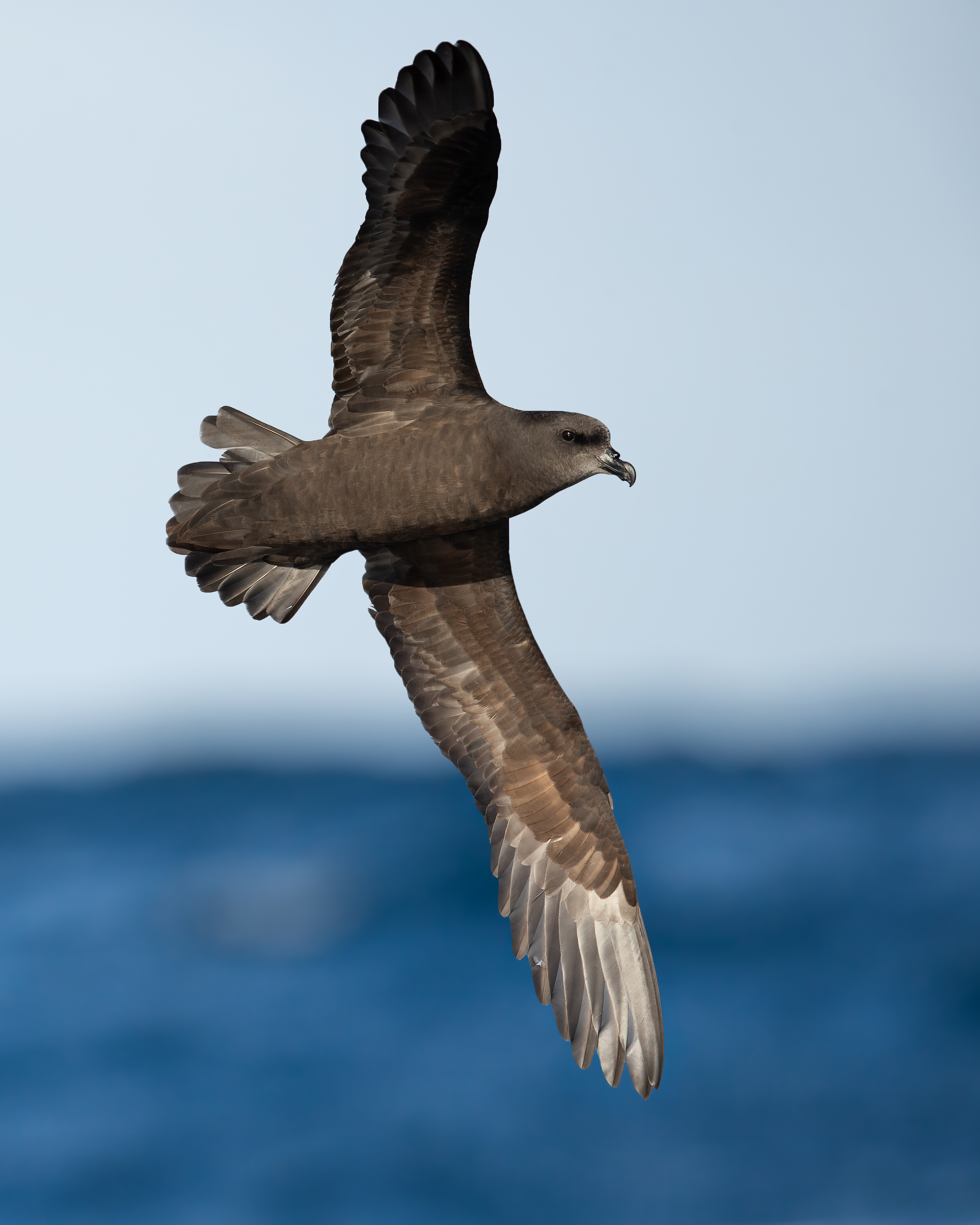
Great-winged petrel (Pterodroma macroptera), east of the Tasman Peninsula, Tasmania, Australia

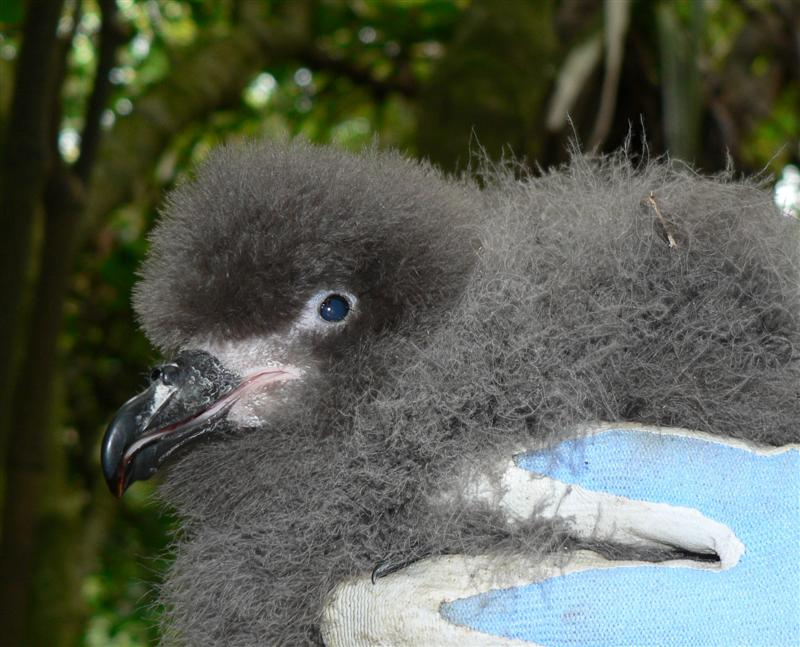
Young bird
