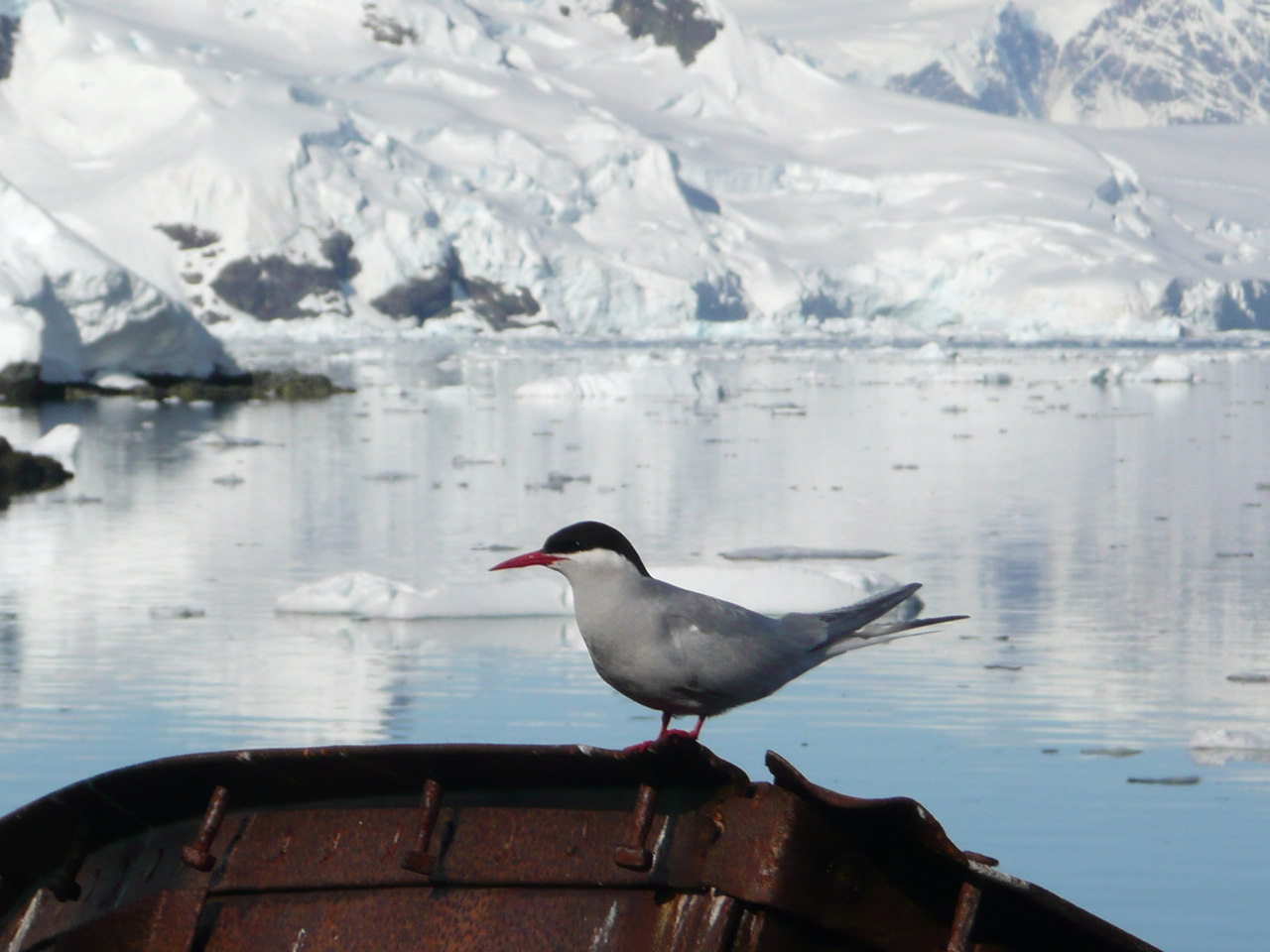

Conservation status
- Least Concern (IUCN 3.1)

Scientific classification
- Kingdom: Animalia
- Phylum: Chordata
- Class: Aves
- Order: Charadriiformes
- Family: Laridae
- Genus: Sterna
- Species: S. vittata

Binomial name
- Sterna vittata Gmelin, JF, 1789
- Breeding Nonbreeding Year-round Passage

= Antarctic tern =

Species of bird

The Antarctic tern (Sterna vittata) is a seabird in the family Laridae. It ranges throughout the southern oceans and is found on small islands around Antarctica as well as on the shores of the mainland. Its diet consists primarily of small fish and crustaceans. It is very similar in appearance to the closely related Arctic tern, but it is stockier, and it is in its breeding plumage in the southern summer, when the Arctic tern has shed old feathers to get its non-breeding plumage. The Antarctic tern does not migrate like the Arctic tern does, but it can still be found on a very large range. This tern species is actually more closely related to the South American tern.

Gulls, skuas and jaegers are the primary predators of the bird's eggs and young.

The Antarctic tern can be further divided into six subspecies. The total global population of this bird is around 140,000 individuals.

== Taxonomy ==
The Antarctic tern was formally described in 1789 by the German naturalist Johann Friedrich Gmelin in his revised and expanded edition of Carl Linnaeus's Systema Naturae. He placed it with the other terns in the genus Sterna and coined the binomial name Sterna vittata. Gmelin based his description on the "wreathed tern" that had been described in 1785 by the English ornithologist John Latham in his book A General Synopsis of Birds . Latham had been provided with a specimen by the naturalist Joseph Banks. Latham mistakenly believed it had come from Christmas Island in the Indian Ocean but it had actually been collected at Christmas Harbour in the Kerguelen Islands in December 1776 during James Cook's third voyage to the Pacific Ocean. A drawing of the bird was made by William Wade Ellis. The genus name Sterna comes from the Old English word for a black tern. The specific epithet vittata is from Latin vittatus meaning "banded".

There are six recognized subspecies, each with their specific breeding sites.

- S. v. tristanensis Murphy, 1938 – Tristan da Cunha & Gough Island
- S. v. sanctipauli Gould, 1865 – St. Paul & Amsterdam Islands.
- S. v. georgiae Reichenow, 1904 – South Georgia, South Orkney & South Sandwich Islands
- S. v. gaini Murphy, 1938 – South Shetland Islands, Antarctic Peninsula & nearby islands
- S. v. vittata Gmelin, 1789 – Prince Edward, Crozet, Kerguelen, Bouvet & Heard Islands
- S. v. bethunei Buller, 1896 – Stewart, Snares, Auckland, Bounty, Antipodes, Campbell & Macquarie Islands

Terns are in the family Laridae along with gulls and skimmers. Terns make up the sub-family Sterninae, which spreads into eleven genera. The Antarctic terns are in the genus Sterna, which has been established to be monophyletic. However, this claim has been challenged by a genetic study.

== Description ==
The Antarctic tern is a medium-sized tern ranging from 35 to 40 cm (14 to 16 in) in length with a wingspan of 74 to 79 cm (29 to 31 in). It weighs between 150 and 180 g (5.3 and 6.3 oz) but it tends to be heavier during the winter months.

In breeding plumage, the tern has light grey body and wings. Its deeply forked tail, lower back just above it and cheeks are white. It also has a distinctive black cap that reaches from the nape down to the bill and the eye is brownish-black. The bill, legs and feet are bright red. In non-breeding plumage, the black cap is reduced to just the area behind the eyes, the underparts become lighter and the bill becomes a dull reddish-black colour. Juveniles have yellowish-brown, grey, and white spots on their backs, with a yellowish-brown belly and breast. Their bill is dull black and the legs are dull red. The chicks have a yellowish-brown colour with black spots on their heads and back. They have a greyish white belly with a darker throat. The bill, legs and feet can be flesh colored or reddish black.

The Antarctic tern closely resembles the Arctic tern. However, the local Antarctic Terns are in their breeding plumage when the migrating Arctic Terns arrive in their non-breeding plumage. Arctic terns also have shorter legs and more prominent black margins on the outside of their primary feathers. The white-fronted tern is also quite similar to the Antarctic tern but it can be distinguished by the larger body size, lighter colors, and longer black bill of the white-fronted tern. The different subspecies vary in size and plumage tone but are often hard to distinguish from one another.

Antarctic terns are quite noisy around their roost sites. "trr-trr-kriah" is their main call and is given when they are in flight or fishing. They also use a "chrrrr" to defend their nests against intruders or predators. They make a higher-pitched call to catch the attention of their mates.

== Distribution and habitat ==
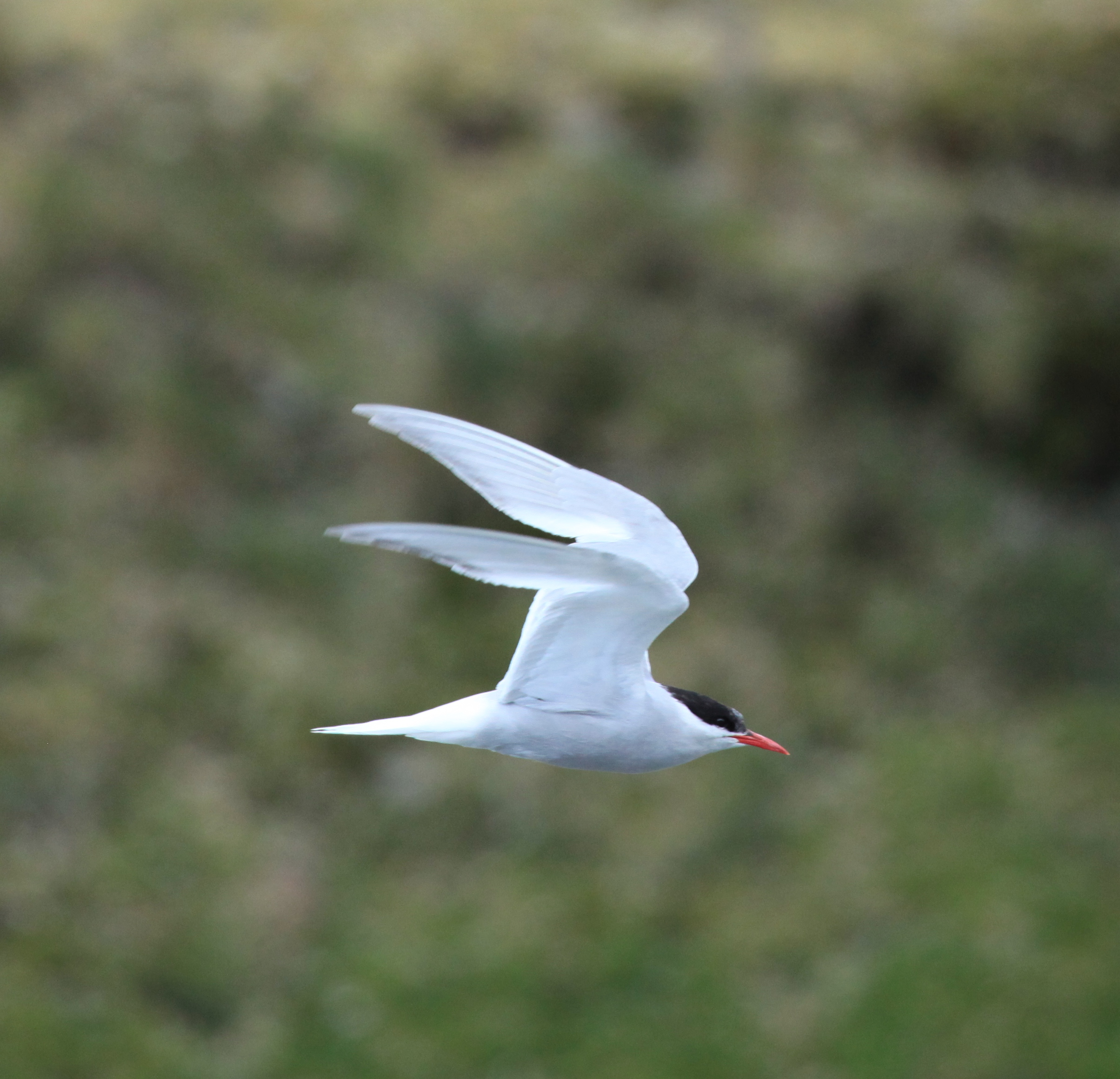
Antarctic tern flying over St Andrews Bay, South Georgia, British Overseas Territories

The Antarctic tern prefers rocky areas such as islets, with or without vegetation, often among other seabird species. It usually nests on cliffs but is also found on rocky beaches, places inaccessible to cats or rats. It also avoids beaches with sea lions, as they tend to occupy all flat areas. Outside of the breeding season, this species of tern looks for ice edges in Antarctica. It also visits South Africa's beaches and rocky cliffs.

This species has a large range, widely distributed around sub-Antarctic islands of the southern hemisphere and the Antarctic mainland. The breeding territory of the Antarctic tern includes the Antarctic continent, Bouvet Island, the French Southern Territories, Saint Helena, Ascension and Tristan da Cunha, South Africa, South Georgia, and the South Sandwich Islands. Recently, some populations have been found to take advantage of newly ice-free terrain on the north-eastern Antarctic Peninsula when nesting.

Each subspecies have specific breeding islands. After breeding, the Antarctic tern does not undertake a long migration to the opposite pole like the Arctic tern does. It usually remains close to the breeding islands all year round. However, the more southern populations migrate slightly further north for the rest of the year. They can be found in Uruguay, Argentina, Brazil, Chile, the Falkland Islands, the Heard Island, the McDonald Islands, Australia, and New Zealand.

== Behavior and ecology ==
=== Food and feeding ===
The Antarctic tern is an opportunistic feeder that mostly eats small fishes as well as some crustaceans like Antarctic krill. It usually fishes gregariously, forming flocks of up to 100 birds when they locate larger shoals. It fishes by hovering a few meters above the sea. When a prey is located, the tern has two strategies: most of the time it will directly plunge dive and become completely submerged but if the water is too rough it will only submerge its bill whilst in flight. It normally forages near the shore in the kelp zone. It has also been found in the intertidal zone, scavenging for small crustaceans, polychaetes, and shellfish. However, during the breeding season, it does not venture very far from its nest.

=== Breeding ===
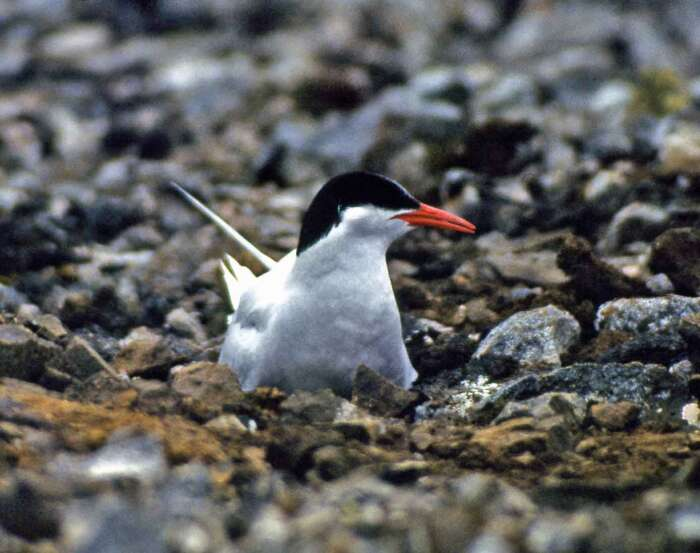
Antarctic tern brooding on King George Island

The Antarctic tern usually breeds from November to December, but this can vary depending on climate and the availability of food. The birds are usually found in loose colonies of 5 to 20 pairs, although they may also nest as isolated pairs. However, some islands are home to much larger populations and have colonies of over 1000 pairs. This tern species usually selects depressions or scrapes on the cliff ledge for nesting. It can also be found nesting on the soil, sand, glacial moraines, or a vegetation mat, often within a small pit of pebbles or shells.

The female will lay one or two eggs per breeding season, which will be incubated by both parents for a period of 23 to 25 days. Chicks hatch during the summer months, from December to February. Then, the chicks need to be fed by their parents for 27 to 32 days while they grow fully developed flight feathers. Both members of the pair attend their young for several weeks even after this period. Antarctic terns that survive their first year have a life expectancy of about 17 years with an estimated reproductive time span of about 10 years as they can start breeding at 3 years old.

Gulls, skuas and jaegers feed on the eggs and chicks. The larger water birds also prey upon the adults, leaving young chicks exposed to the harsh weather conditions and starvation. The Antarctic tern will defend its nest against any intruders by repeated dive bombing, occasionally striking them with their sharp bill.

== Threats and Conservation ==
The IUCN Red List classifies the Antarctic tern as a species of least concern in terms of conservation status. The population is stable and is currently estimated to be between 132,000 and 145,000 individuals, with about 45,000 breeding pairs. The majority are from the subspecies S. v. gaini. However, reproduction failures have been recorded on certain islands mostly due to introduced mammalian predators, namely domestic cats and rats.

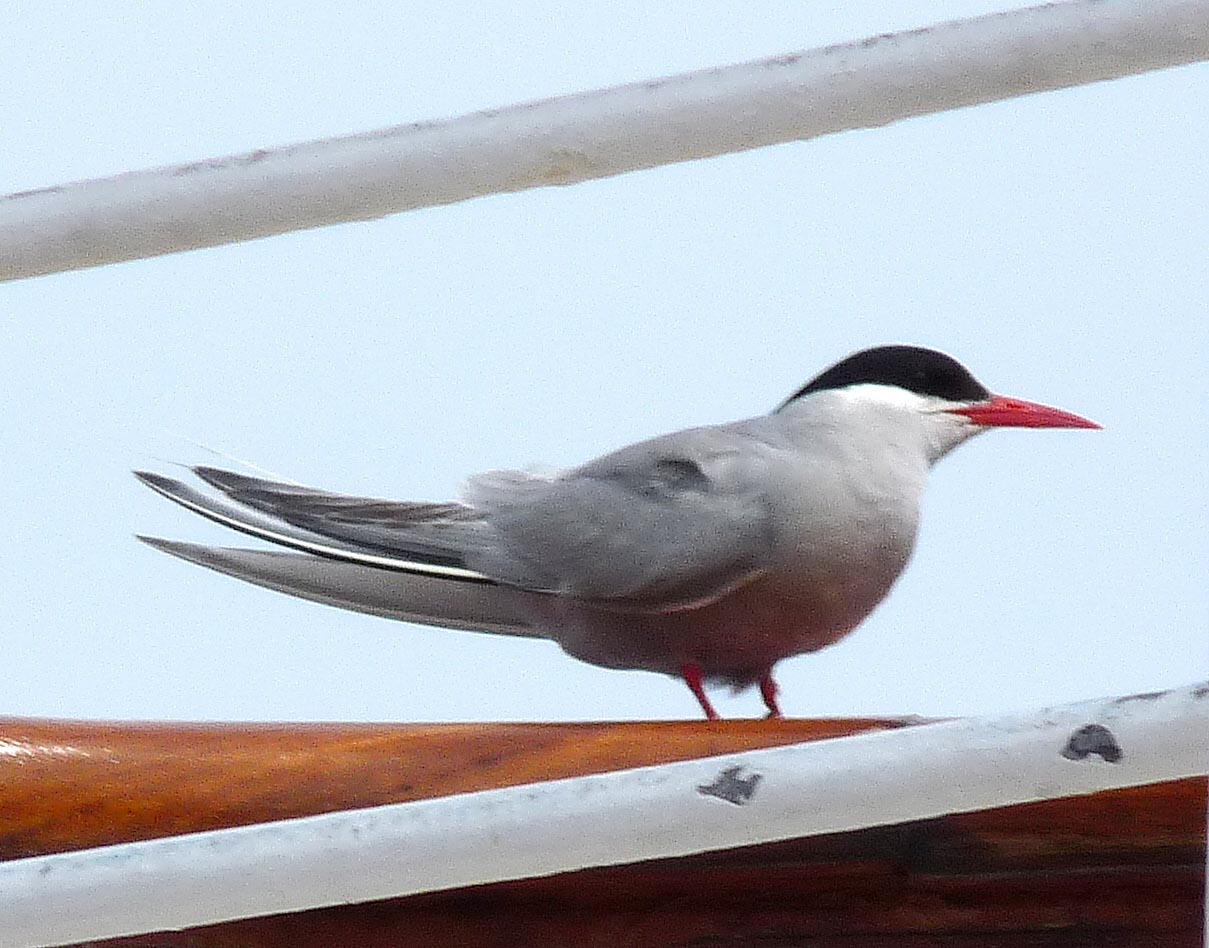
Antarctic tern in breeding plumage

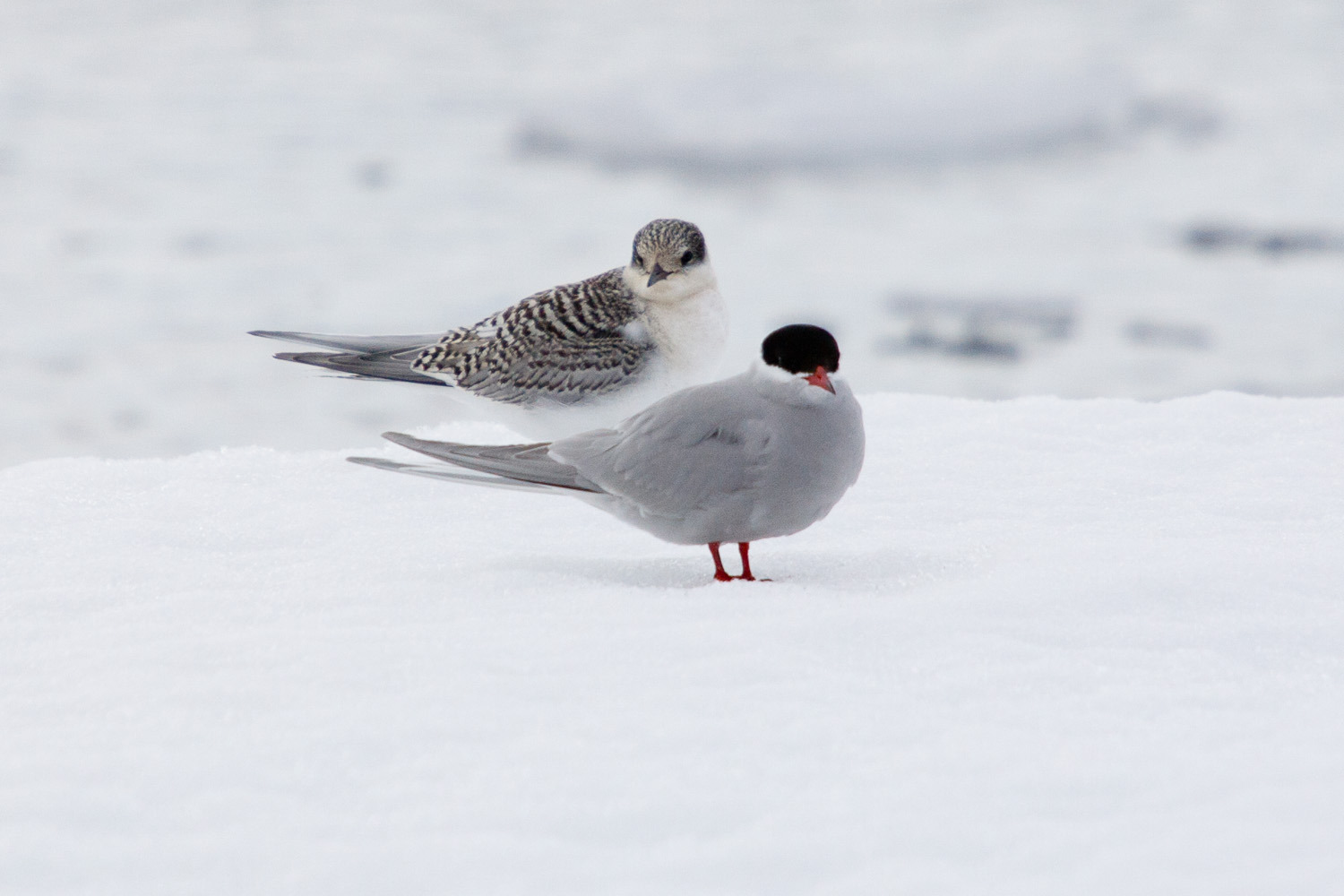
Adult Antarctic tern (front) in breeding plumage with a chick (back).

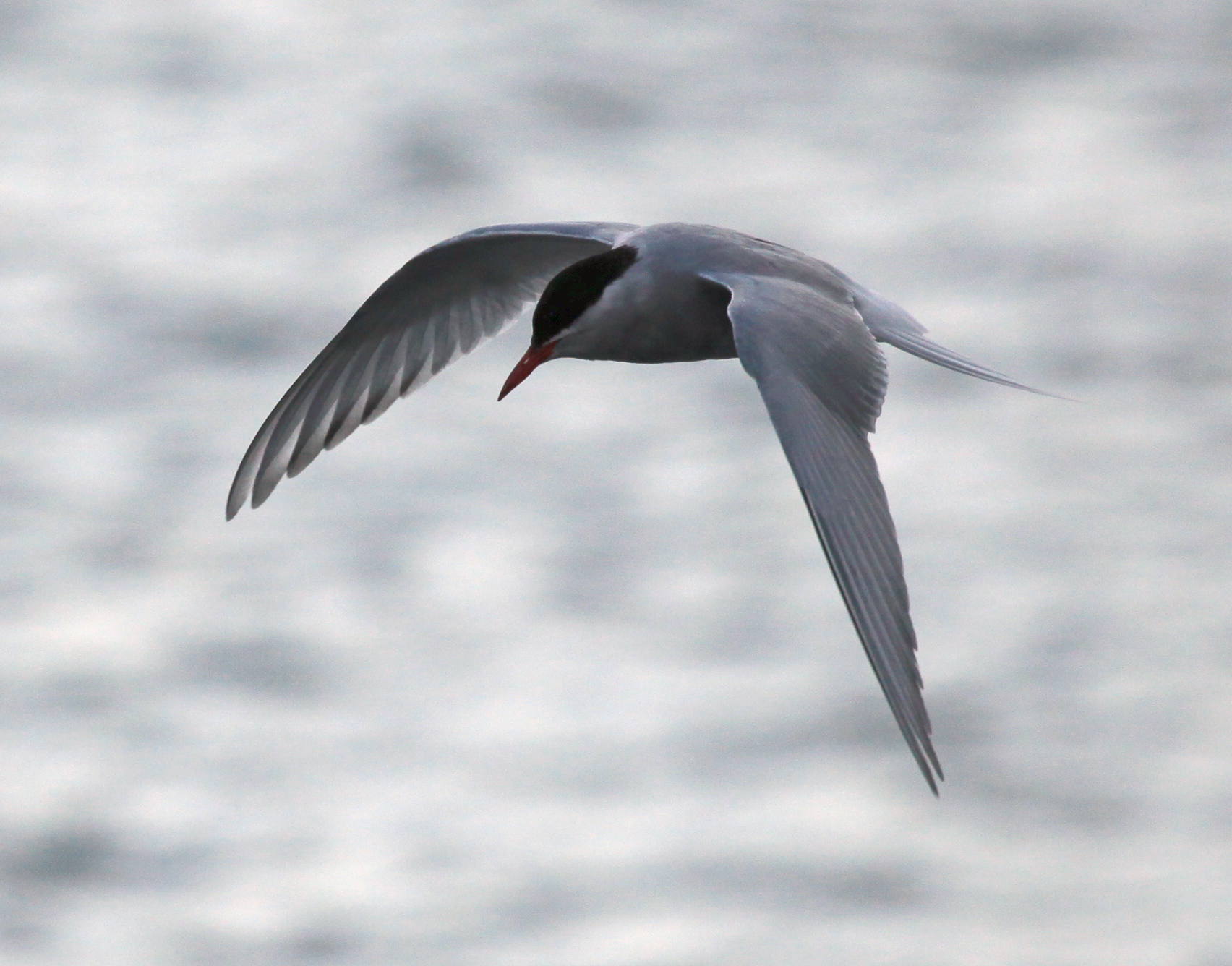
Antarctic tern in flight

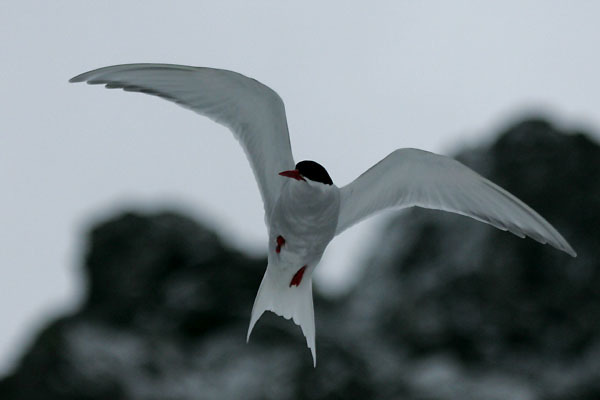
Antarctic tern in flight, seen from below.
