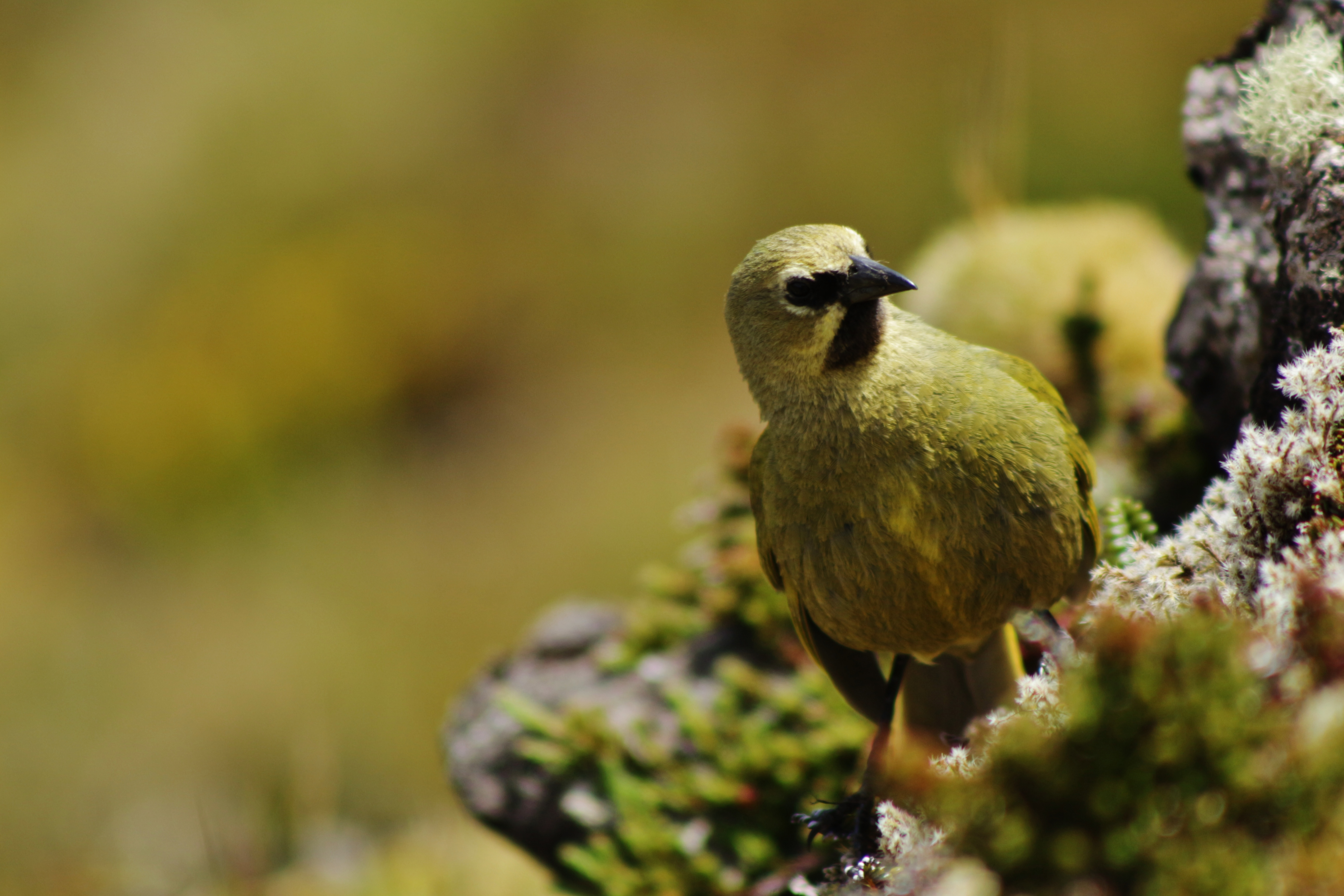
- Male on Gough Island

Conservation status
- Critically Endangered (IUCN 3.1)

Scientific classification
- Kingdom: Animalia
- Phylum: Chordata
- Class: Aves
- Order: Passeriformes
- Family: Thraupidae
- Genus: Rowettia; Lowe, 1923
- Species: R. goughensis

Binomial name
- Rowettia goughensis (Clarke, WE, 1904)

Synonyms
- Nesospiza goughensis (protonym); Nesospiza jessiae

= Gough finch =

Species of bird

The Gough finch (Rowettia goughensis) or Gough bunting, is a critically endangered species of songbird.

== Taxonomy ==
The Gough finch was formally described in 1904 by the British ornithologist William Eagle Clarke from a specimen collected on Gough Island in the South Atlantic. Clarke coined the binomial name Nesospiza goughensis. The Gough finch is now the only species placed in the genus Rowettia that was introduced in 1923 by the English ornithologist Percy Lowe. The genus name was chosen to honour John Quiller Rowett, an English businessman and the sponsor of the Shackleton–Rowett Expedition. The Gough finch was traditionally considered to be a bunting in the family Emberizidae, but molecular phylogenetic studies have shown that it is a member of the subfamily Diglossinae in the tanager family Thraupidae and is sister to a clade containing birds in the genus Melanodera. The species is monotypic: no subspecies are recognised.

Another species of finch was described from Gough Island, Nesospiza jessiae, in 1904. This species was later identified as a juvenile of the Gough finch.

== Description ==
The Gough finch is 22 to 26 cm (8.7–10.2 in) in length and weighs 50–56 g (1.8–2.0 oz).

== Distribution and habitat ==
It is endemic to the remote Gough Island, part of the British overseas territory of Saint Helena, and nearby stacks, in the South Atlantic. Its natural habitats are temperate shrubland and subantarctic grassland.

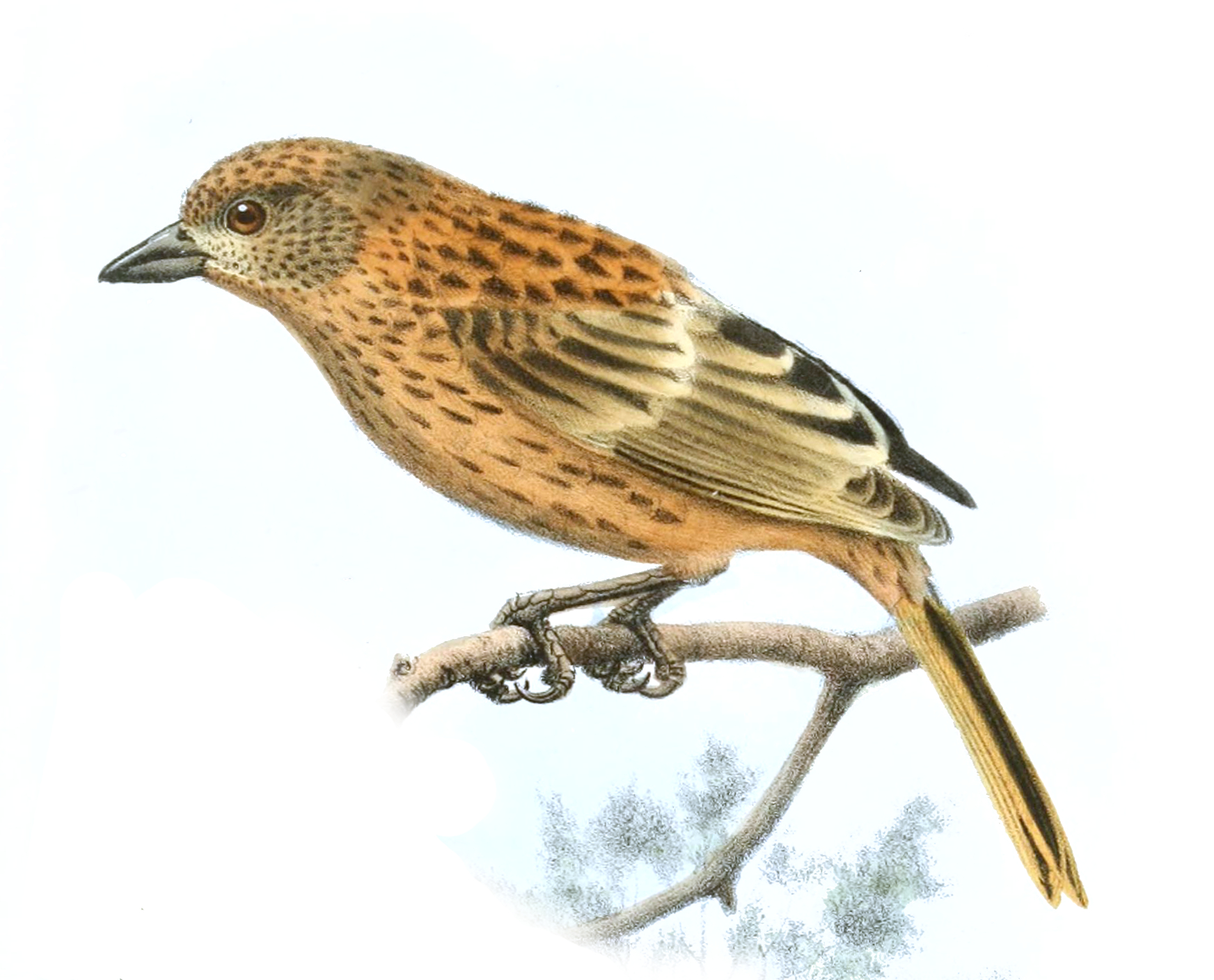
The immature was described as Nesospiza jessiae

== Status and conservation ==
It was formerly classified as a Vulnerable species by the IUCN. But new research has shown that its population has collapsed and it is on the verge of extinction due to the introduced population of house mice (Mus musculus), noted for its unusual aggressiveness, competing with the birds for food and eating their eggs and nestlings. Consequently, it was uplisted to Critically Endangered in 2008.
