= Gough Island =

Island in the South Atlantic

Gough Island Gonçalo Álvares
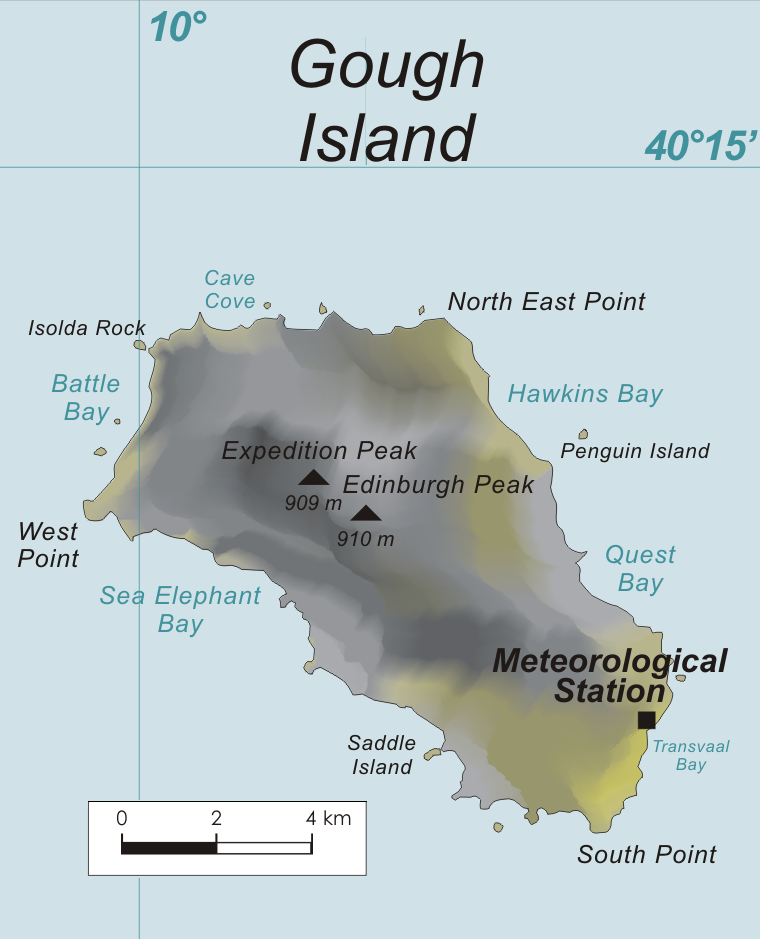
- Map of Gough Island

- Location within South Atlantic

Geography
- Location: South Atlantic Ocean
- Coordinates: 40°19′12″S 09°56′24″W
- Archipelago: Tristan da Cunha
- Area: 65 km^{2} (25 sq mi)
- Length: 13 km (8.1 mi)
- Width: 5 km (3.1 mi)
- Highest elevation: 910 m (2990 ft)
- Highest point: Edinburgh Peak

Administration
- United Kingdom (British Overseas Territories)
- St Helena, Ascension and Tristan da Cunha

UNESCO World Heritage Site
- Criteria: Natural: (vii), (x)
- Reference: 740
- Inscription: 1995 (19th Session)
- IUCN category Ia (strict nature reserve)

Ramsar Wetland
- Designated: 20 November 2008
- Reference no.: 1868

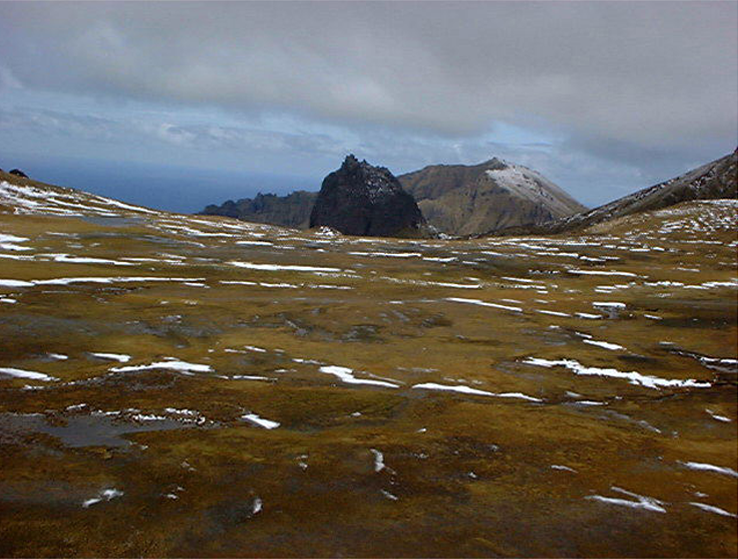
View of Gough Island

Gough Island (/ɡɒf/ GOF), also known historically as Gonçalo Álvares, is a rugged volcanic island in the South Atlantic Ocean. It is a dependency of Tristan da Cunha and part of the British overseas territory of Saint Helena, Ascension and Tristan da Cunha. It is approximately 400 km (250 mi) south-east of the Tristan da Cunha archipelago (which includes Nightingale Island and Inaccessible Island), 2,400 km (1,500 mi) north-east from South Georgia Island, 2,700 km (1,700 mi) west from Cape Town, South Africa, and over 3,200 km (2,000 mi) from the nearest point of South America.

Gough Island is inhabited only by the personnel of a weather station (usually six people) that the South African National Antarctic Programme has maintained, with British permission, continually on the island since 1956. It is one of the most remote places with a constant human presence. It is part of the UNESCO World Heritage Site of "Gough and Inaccessible Islands" and one of the most important seabird colonies in the world.

== Name ==
The island was first named Ilha de Gonçalo Álvares on Portuguese maps, a name which it still goes by in modern Portuguese. Gonçalo Álvares was a Portuguese explorer who discovered the island in 1505. Confusion of the unusual Portuguese saint name Gonçalo with Spanish Diego led to the misnomer Diego Alvarez Island in English-language sources from the 1800s to 1930s. However, the most likely explanation is that it was simply a misreading of "Is. de Go. Alvarez", the name by which the island is represented on some of the early charts, the "de Go" mutating into "Diego".

The name "Gough island" refers to the British mariner Captain Charles Gough of the Richmond, who sighted the island in 1732.

== History ==
The details of the discovery of Gough Island are unclear, but the most likely occasion is July 1505 by the Portuguese explorer Gonçalo Álvares. Maps during the next three centuries named the island after him. On some later maps, this was erroneously given as Diego Alvarez.

According to some historians, the British merchant Anthony de la Roché was the first to land on the island, in the austral autumn of 1675.

Charles Gough rediscovered the island on 3 March 1732, thinking it was a new find. It had been named Gonçalo Álvares since 1505 after the captain of Vasco da Gama's flagship on his epic voyage to the east, and under this name, it was marked with reasonable accuracy on the charts of the South Atlantic during the following 230 or so years. Then, in 1732, Captain Gough of the British ship Richmond reported the discovery of a new island, which he placed 400 miles (640 km) to the east of Gonçalo Álvares. Fifty years later, cartographers realised that the two islands were the same, and despite the priority of the Portuguese discovery, and the greater accuracy of the position given by them, "Gough's Island" was the name adopted. It is still known by its old name Ilha de Gonçalo Álvares in Portuguese, though Portugal lays no claim to any of the islands in the Tristan da Cunha archipelago.

Sealers sometimes briefly inhabited the island in the 19th Century. The earliest known example is a sealing gang from the U.S. ship Rambler (Captain Joseph Bowditch) which remained on the island in the 1804–1805 season. The sealing era lasted from 1804 to 1910 during which 34 sealing vessels are known to have visited the island, one of which was lost offshore.

The Scottish National Antarctic Expedition on the Scotia made the first visit to the island by a scientific party on 21 April 1904, when William Speirs Bruce and others collected specimens. The Shackleton–Rowett Expedition also stopped at the island in 1922. There was a brief period of human occupation for two years from 1936 to 1938 when farming was done to hunt for birds, their eggs, and to extract driftwood, guano and apples. The 1955 Gough Expedition mapped out the internal geography of the island and also studied its biota over several months.

Gough Island was formally claimed in 1938 for the United Kingdom, during a visit by HMS Milford (L51) of the Royal Navy.

In 1995, the island was inscribed as a UNESCO World Heritage Site. In 2004, the site was extended to include Inaccessible Island, and the marine zone of Gough Island was extended from 3 to 12 nautical miles (5.6 to 22.2 km; 3.5 to 13.8 mi). The site was renamed Gough and Inaccessible Islands. The selection criteria for the site do not include its geomorphic interest. As it happens, Gough and Inaccessible Islands are included in a possible "serial trans-boundary nomination" for the Mid-Atlantic Ridge, which would include other volcanic sites in the Atlantic.

Gough Island is the only land outside South America from which the solar eclipse of 12 September 2034 (excluding partial phases), will be visible; the centre of the path of totality crosses over the island.

== Geography and geology ==
One of the most remote islands in the world, Gough Island is in the South Atlantic Ocean. While the central part of the island is a plateau, the western part has a highland with the peaks and cliffs rising over 350 metres. Gough Island is roughly rectangular with a length of 13 km (8.1 mi) and a width of 5 km (3.1 mi). It has an area of 65 km^{2} (25 sq mi) and rises to a highest point over 900 m (3,000 ft) above sea level. Glens cut deep into the inland mountains from the northern and eastern sides. Geological formations on the island are of volcanic origin.

Topographic features include its highest peak, Edinburgh Peak (2,986 ft (910 m)), as well as Hags Tooth, Mount Rowett, Sea Elephant Bay, Quest Bay, and Hawkins Bay.

Surrounding Gough are small satellite islands and rocks, such as Southwest Island, Saddle Island (to the South), Tristiana Rock, Isolda Rock (West), Round Island, Cone Island, Lot's Wife, Church Rock (North), Penguin Island (Northeast), and The Admirals (East).

The average temperature is 12 °C (54 °F) while the average rainfall is 3,000 mm (120 in). Snow falls in the highlands in winter.

=== Climate ===
According to the Köppen system, Gough Island features an oceanic climate (Cfb). Gough Island's maximum temperatures are between 11 °C (52 °F) and 17 °C (63 °F) during the day year-round, due to its isolated position far out in the South Atlantic. As a result, summers are never hot and are highly susceptible to cold fronts. The Atlantic is much cooler in the southern hemisphere than in the northern, but frosts are still very rare due to heavy cloud cover. Precipitation is high throughout the year, and sunshine hours are few. Snow frequently falls on the peaks and plateau all year round (with occurrences of summer snow on the 900-metre peaks), but is uncommon at sea-level.

Climate data for Gough Island, elevation 54 m (177 ft), (1991–2020 normals, extremes 1956–1990)
Month	Jan	Feb	Mar	Apr	May	Jun	Jul	Aug	Sep	Oct	Nov	Dec	Year
Record high °C (°F)	26.4 (79.5)	25.7 (78.3)	25.9 (78.6)	22.6 (72.7)	20.5 (68.9)	20.6 (69.1)	19.3 (66.7)	21.7 (71.1)	19.3 (66.7)	21.4 (70.5)	23.9 (75.0)	25.1 (77.2)	26.4 (79.5)
Mean daily maximum °C (°F)	18.1 (64.6)	18.3 (64.9)	17.3 (63.1)	15.7 (60.3)	13.9 (57.0)	12.7 (54.9)	12.1 (53.8)	11.8 (53.2)	12.1 (53.8)	13.4 (56.1)	15.1 (59.2)	17.2 (63.0)	14.8 (58.6)
Daily mean °C (°F)	15.0 (59.0)	15.2 (59.4)	14.5 (58.1)	13.2 (55.8)	11.5 (52.7)	10.4 (50.7)	9.7 (49.5)	9.4 (48.9)	9.6 (49.3)	10.8 (51.4)	12.4 (54.3)	14.2 (57.6)	12.2 (54.0)
Mean daily minimum °C (°F)	11.9 (53.4)	12.2 (54.0)	11.8 (53.2)	10.7 (51.3)	9.1 (48.4)	8.0 (46.4)	7.4 (45.3)	7.0 (44.6)	7.1 (44.8)	8.2 (46.8)	9.6 (49.3)	11.2 (52.2)	9.5 (49.1)
Record low °C (°F)	5.3 (41.5)	5.1 (41.2)	4.8 (40.6)	3.7 (38.7)	1.4 (34.5)	0.1 (32.2)	−0.9 (30.4)	−2.7 (27.1)	0.2 (32.4)	0.5 (32.9)	2.4 (36.3)	4.1 (39.4)	−2.7 (27.1)
Average precipitation mm (inches)	210.8 (8.30)	179.4 (7.06)	238.4 (9.39)	273.3 (10.76)	317.1 (12.48)	321.7 (12.67)	286.7 (11.29)	295.1 (11.62)	271.6 (10.69)	274.0 (10.79)	235.3 (9.26)	214.2 (8.43)	3,117.5 (122.74)
Average precipitation days (≥ 1.0 mm)	14.5	13.5	15.0	17.6	22.0	21.1	21.5	22.1	18.8	16.8	15.2	14.0	212.1
Average relative humidity (%)	81	82	82	82	82	83	83	83	81	81	81	81	82
Mean monthly sunshine hours	177.2	154.4	126.3	100.9	82.5	67.6	71.1	90.5	103.0	127.9	157.7	172.5	1,442.4
Source: NOAA (humidity 1961–1990), Deutscher Wetterdienst (extremes)

== Fauna and flora ==
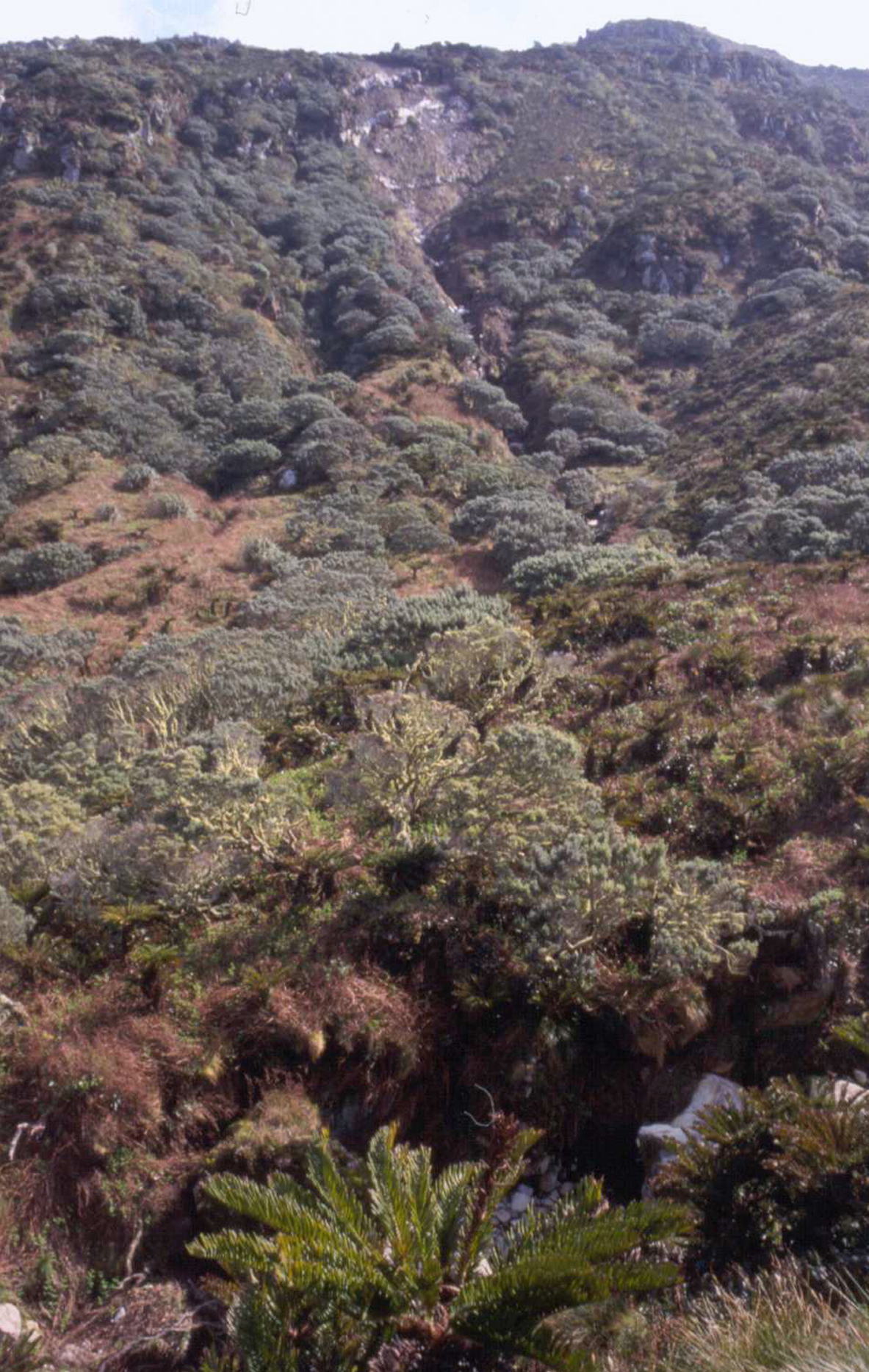
The fern Blechnum and tree Phylica on Gough Island

Gough and Inaccessible Island are a protected wildlife reserve, which has been designated a World Heritage Site by UNESCO. It has been described as one of the least disrupted ecosystems of its kind and one of the best shelters for nesting seabirds in the Atlantic. In particular, it is host to almost the entire world population of the Tristan albatross (Diomedea dabbenena) and the Atlantic petrel (Pterodroma incerta). The island is also home to the almost flightless Gough moorhen, and the critically endangered Gough bunting.

=== Birds ===
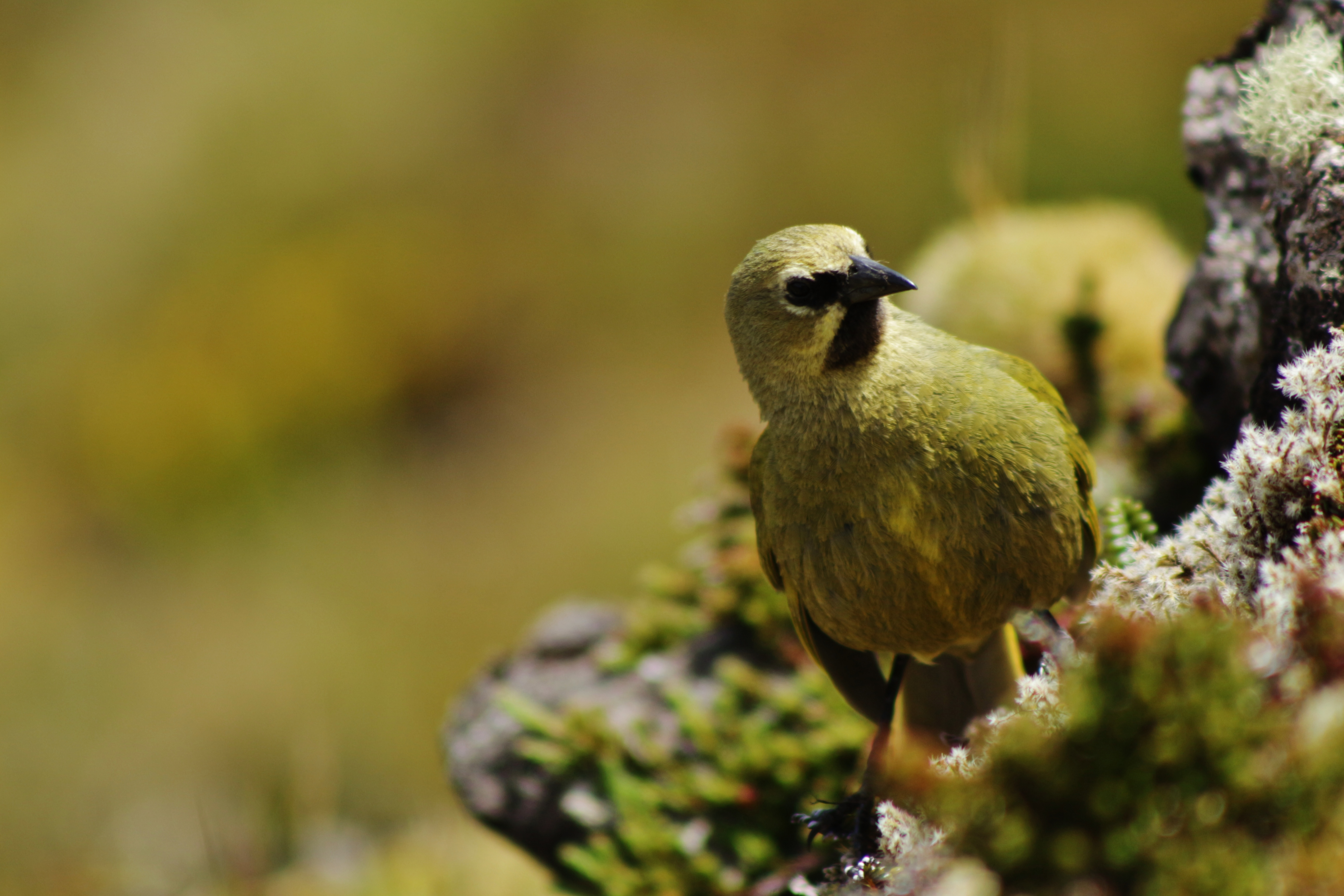
A male Gough Bunting on the island

The island has been identified as an Important Bird Area (IBA) by BirdLife International for its endemic landbirds and as a breeding site for seabirds. Birds for which the IBA has conservation significance include northern rockhopper penguins (30,000 breeding pairs), Tristan albatrosses (1,500–2,000 pairs), sooty albatrosses (5,000 pairs), Atlantic yellow-nosed albatrosses (5,000 pairs), broad-billed prions (1,750,000 pairs), Kerguelen petrels (20,000 pairs), soft-plumaged petrels (400,000 pairs), Atlantic petrels (900,000 pairs), great-winged petrels (5,000 pairs), grey petrels (10,000 pairs), great shearwaters (100,000 pairs), little shearwaters (10,000 pairs), grey-backed storm petrels (10,000 pairs), white-faced storm petrels (10,000 pairs), white-bellied storm petrels (10,000 pairs), Antarctic terns (500 pairs), southern skuas (500 pairs), Gough moorhens (2,500 pairs), and Gough buntings (3,000 individuals).

=== Mammals ===
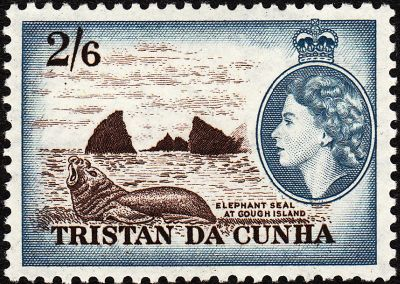
Elephant seal at Gough Island depicted on a 1954 Tristan da Cunha stamp

Southern right whales migrate around the island, but the only mammals on it not introduced by humans are subantarctic fur seals and southern elephant seals, both of which breed on the beaches. House mice, which most likely arrived with early sealing crews, are still present (see Invasive species below) and have grown to be much larger than elsewhere as an example of the island rule.

=== Invasive species ===
==== Pearlwort (Sagina procumbens) ====
In 1998, a number of procumbent pearlwort (Sagina procumbens) plants were found on the island which are capable of dramatically transforming the upland plant ecosystem (as it has on the Prince Edward Islands). Eradication efforts are ongoing but are expected to require years of 'concerted effort'. By 2010, through removing plants manually with some soil and then treating the area with boiling water, it had been restricted to one small area of coastal cliffs. As a result, the seed load had been reduced in a decade by 3 orders of magnitude. This nevertheless could result in 200 plants germinating per square metre. To reduce the population further, a study indicated that a combination of soil removal and herbicide could be effective. A report in 2020 noted that continued removal was still needed as well as biosecurity measures to avoid re-introduction.

==== Other non-native plants ====
By 2020 the following non-native plants with potential to become invasive had been recorded recently on the island: purpletop vervain (Verbena bonariensis), potato (Solanum tuberosum), common rush (Juncus effusus), black bent (Agrostis gigantea), cabbage (Brassica rapa) and Bermuda grass (Cynodon dactylon).

==== House mice ====
In April 2007, researchers published evidence that predation by introduced house mice on seabird chicks is occurring at levels that might drive the Tristan albatross and the Atlantic petrel to extinction. As of October 2018, it is estimated that as many as 2,000,000 fewer eggs and chicks are being raised due to the impact of mice on the island, threatening the extinction of several species of seabirds that breed exclusively or nearly exclusively on Gough Island.

The Royal Society for the Protection of Birds (RSPB) awarded £62,000 by the UK government's Overseas Territories Environment Programme to fund additional research on the Gough Island mice and a feasibility study of how best to deal with them. This grant also paid for the assessment of a rat problem on Tristan da Cunha island. Trials for a method of eradicating the mice through baiting were commenced, and ultimately a £9.2 million eradication programme was planned, set to begin in 2020, with the island expected to be mouse-free by 2022. However, the start date was delayed until 2021 due to the COVID-19 pandemic. The programme used helicopters to drop cereal pellets containing the rodenticide brodifacoum. Gough has also been identified as the third-most important island in the world (out of 107 islands) to be targeted for the removal of non-native invasive mammals in order to save threatened species from extinction and to make major progress towards achieving global conservation targets. The proposed cull was criticised by the director of Animal Aid, stating, "We don't feel we have the right to choose some animals over others ... We don't agree with any culling for so-called conservation purposes. The conservation priority should be making sure wild spaces are protected, but allowing nature to do its thing."

As of December 2021, the head of the project to cull the population of mice considers this to have been a failure, since a living mouse was spotted after the completion of the project, which implied that there are other mice still alive on Gough. Nevertheless, the RSPB is planning a future restoration attempt by applying rodenticide bait, after doing some research to improve this operation.

== Weather station ==
Gough Island Base
- Antarctic base
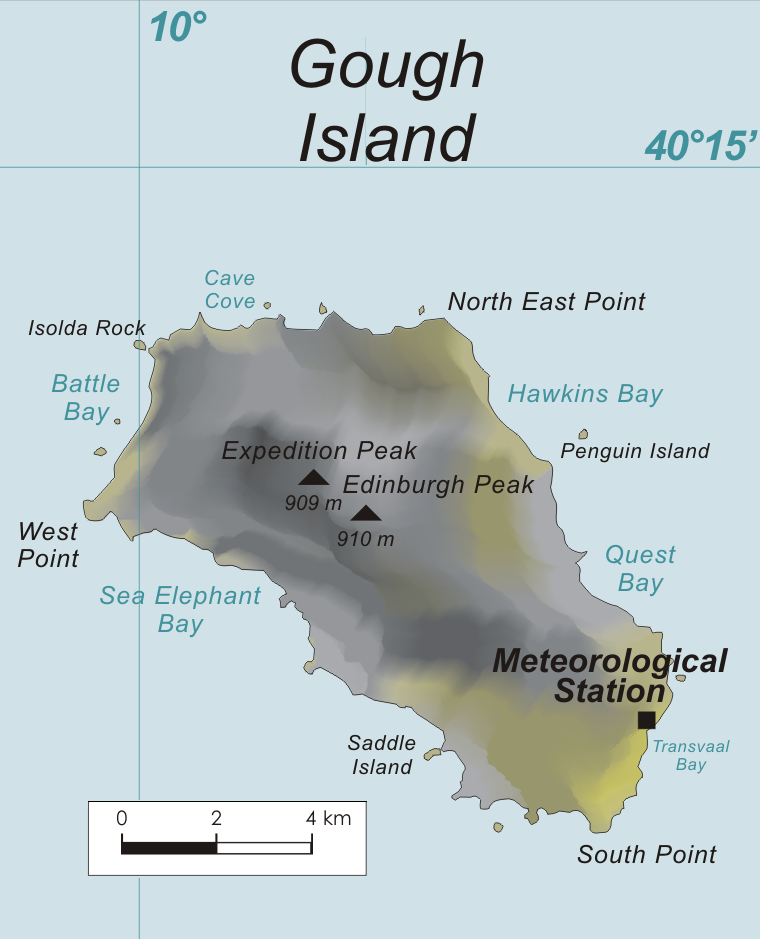
- Location on Gough Island
- Coordinates: 40°20′58″S 9°52′49″W
- Country: South Africa
- Operator: SANAP
- Established: 1956
- Elevation: 54 m (177 ft)

Population
  - Summer: 10
  - Winter: 10
- Time zone: UTC0
- UN/LOCODE: SH TDC
- Active times: All year-round
- Status: Operational
- Activities: Meteorology
- Website: sanap.ac.za

A weather station has been operating on Gough Island since 1956. It is operated as part of the network of the South African Weather Service. Because cold fronts approach South Africa from the south-west, the Gough station is particularly important in forecasting winter weather. Initially it was housed in the station at The Glen, but moved in 1963 to the southern lowlands of the island (near 40°21′0″S 9°52′50″W) for better data collection.

=== Human presence ===
Each year, a new overwintering team arrives by ship from Cape Town (since 2012, on the S. A. Agulhas II) to staff the weather station and perform scientific research. The team for a particular year may be termed as "Gough" and an expedition number: For example, the 1956 team was designated "Gough 01", and the team for 2013 was "Gough 58". Each new team directly replaces the departing one, thereby maintaining a continual human presence on the island.

A team normally consists of:

- A senior meteorologist
- Two junior meteorologists
- A radio technician
- A medic
- A diesel mechanic
- A number of biologists (depending on ongoing research projects)

The team is supplied with enough food to last the whole year. People and cargo are landed either by helicopter, from a helideck-equipped supply ship, or by a fixed crane atop a cliff near the station (a place aptly called "Crane Point"). Several team members have died on the island.

== Maps ==
Relief map

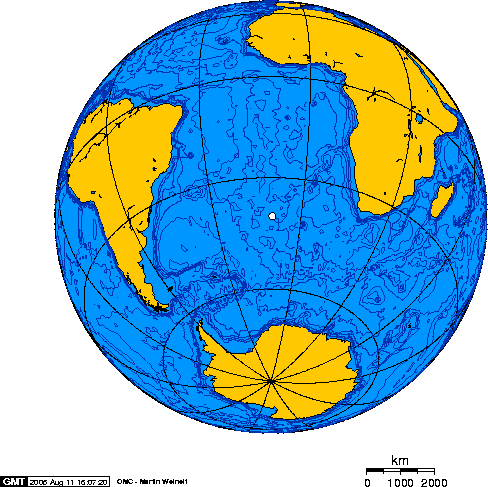
Orthographic projection

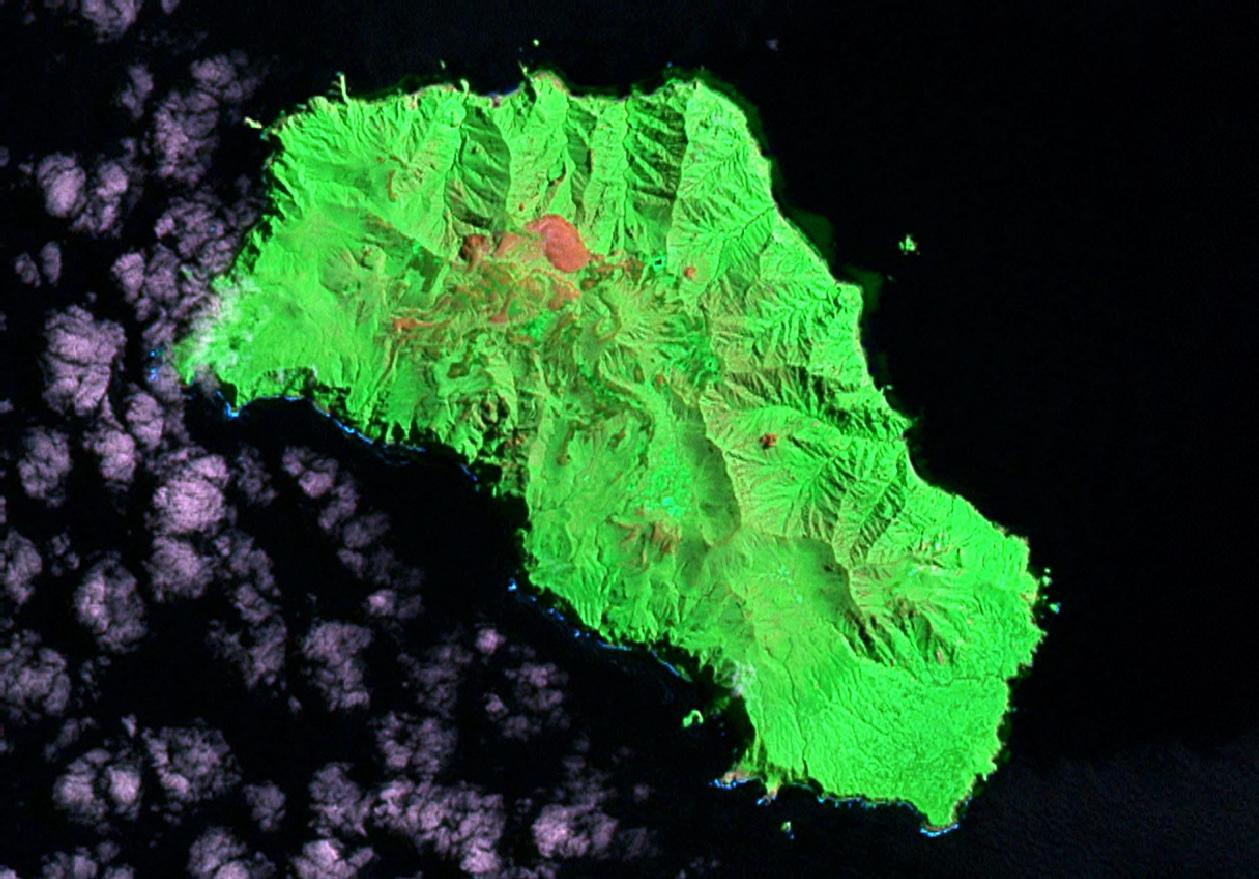
Satellite map

== See also ==
- South African National Antarctic Programme – Government research programme
- SANAE – South African National Antarctic Expedition
- Marion Island – The larger of the Prince Edward Islands
- S. A. Agulhas – South African ice-strengthened training ship and former polar research vessel
- S. A. Agulhas II – Icebreaking polar supply and research ship
- Nigel Morritt Wace – British Royal Marine, botanist and subantarctic guide
