= Tristan da Cunha–Gough Islands shrub and grasslands =

Terrestrial ecoregion which covers the Tristan da Cunha archipelago and Gough Island

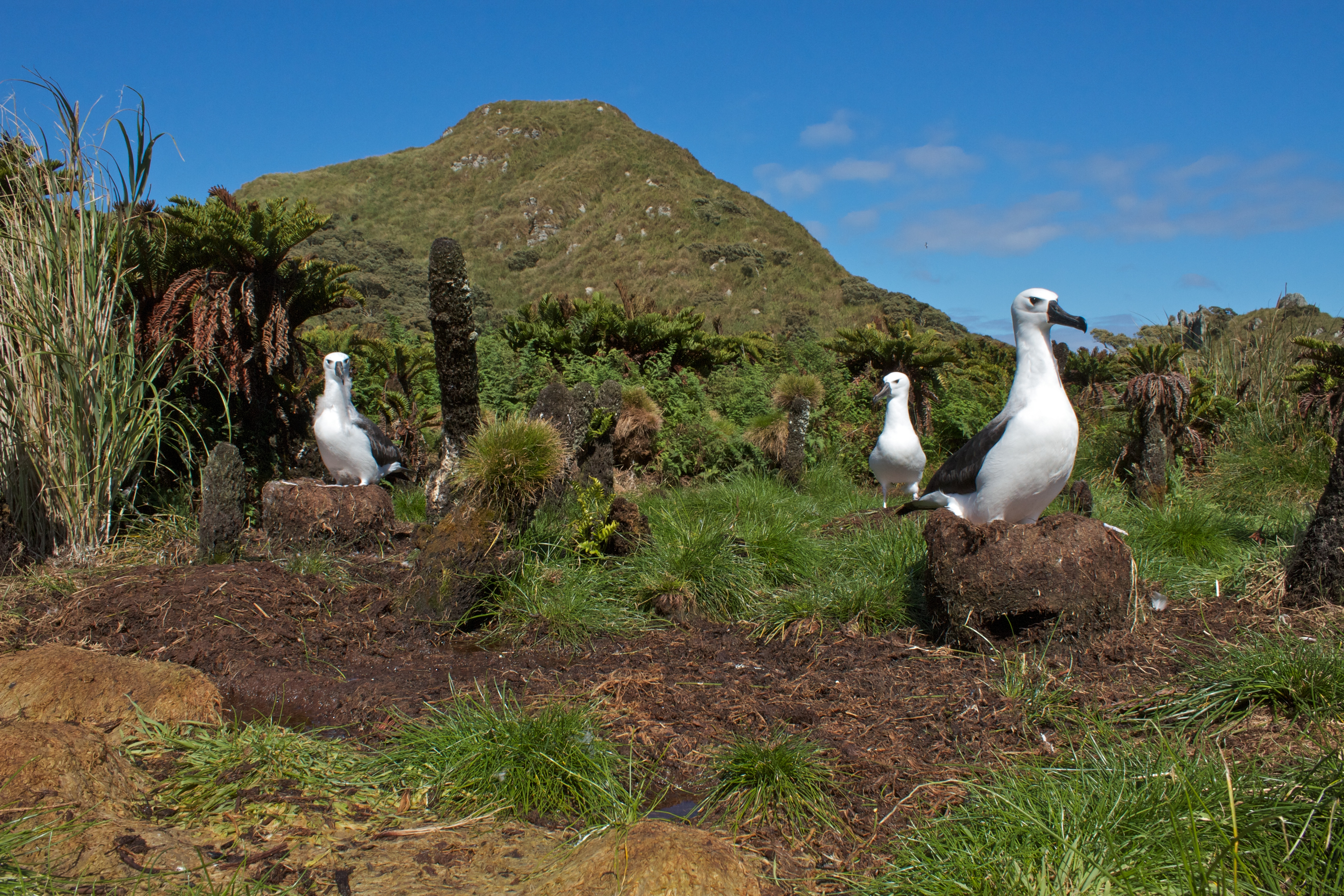
- Albatrosses nesting in fern bush on Nightingale Island

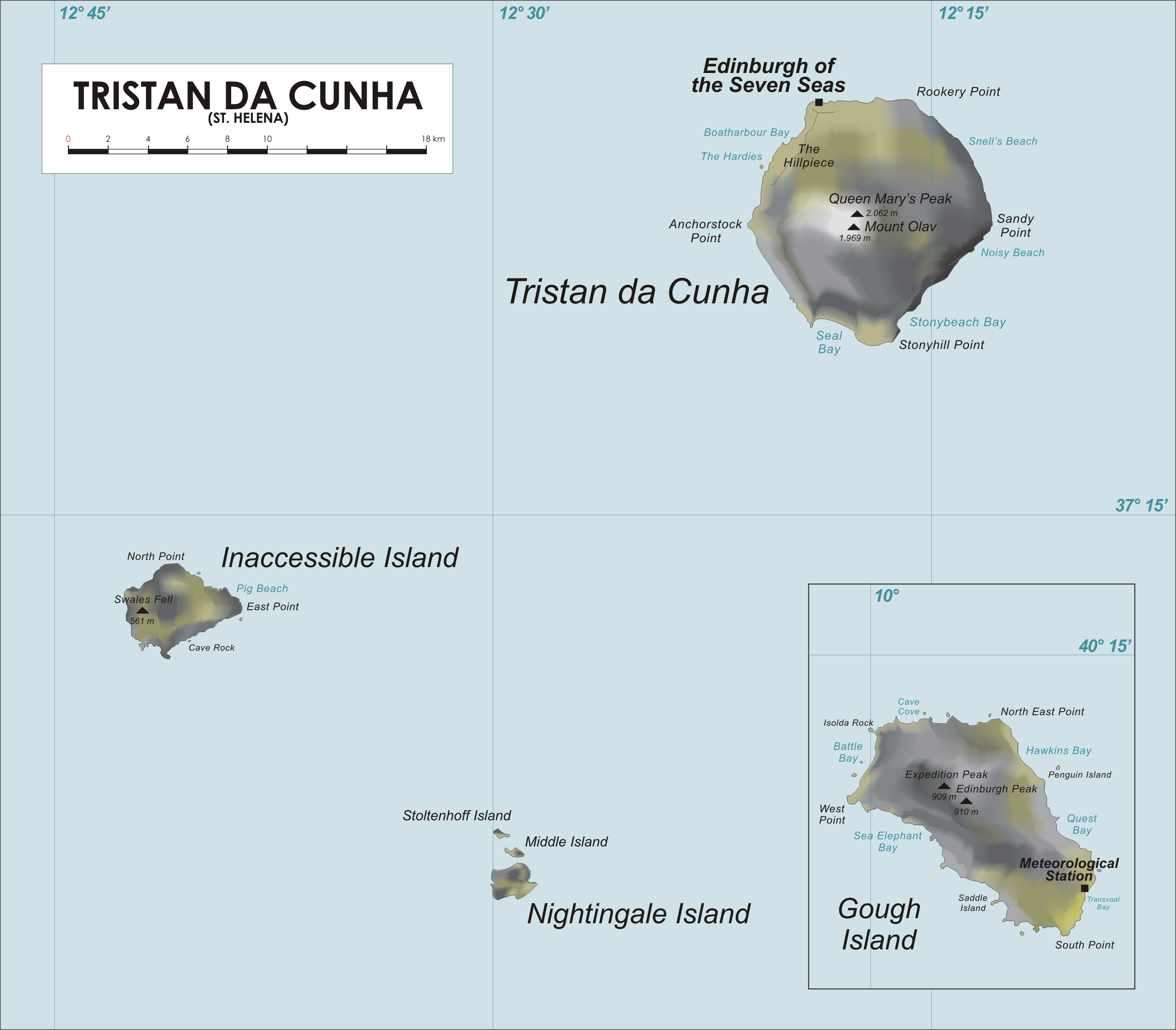
- Map of the Tristan da Cunha and Gough Islands

Ecology
- Realm: Afrotropical
- Biome: temperate grasslands, savannas, and shrublands

Geography
- Area: 122 km^{2} (47 sq mi)
- Country: United Kingdom
- Overseas territory: Saint Helena, Ascension and Tristan da Cunha
- Coordinates: 15.95º S, 5.72º W

Conservation
- Conservation status: Critical/endangered
- Protected: 0 km^{2} (0%)

The Tristan da Cunha–Gough Islands shrub and grasslands is a terrestrial ecoregion which covers the Tristan da Cunha archipelago and Gough Island in the South Atlantic Ocean. The islands' remote location gave rise to many endemic species.

== Geography ==
Tristan da Cunha is in the South Atlantic Ocean, 2,780 km west of the Cape Town on the African mainland.

Tristan da Cunha is the youngest and highest island in the ecoregion, with an area of 41 km^{2}. The island is a volcanic cone that reaches 2,062 metres elevation. Tristan has seacliffs around the shore, up to 600 metres high. A plateau 600 to 900 metres elevation surrounds the central volcanic peak. The central volcano is active, and last erupted in the 1960s. It has a crater lake, and is often covered in snow during the winter. About 250 people live on Tristan. The main settlement and seaport is Edinburgh of the Seven Seas on the northwest coast.

Nightingale Island and Inaccessible Island are southwest of Tristan. Inaccessible is an eroded extinct volcano. Nightingale is a smaller active volcano. Stoltenhoff Island and Center, or Middle, Island are islets near Nightingale. Nightingale, Inaccessible, and the smaller islands are uninhabited.

Gough Island (40°21'S, 09°53'W) is approximately 425 km southeast of Tristan. Gough Island and its neighboring islets and cover 65 km^{2}. The highest point is Edinburgh Peak at 910 metres. The islands are volcanic in origin and last erupted 2400 years ago. Gough Island has a central plateau with several peaks, with cliffs 300 to 450 metres high along the shoreline, with narrow rocky beaches and no natural harbor. The only inhabitants are the crew of a weather station on the southwest side of the island. The islets are mostly within 100 metres of the shore, and the largest support seabird breeding colonies and some vascular plants.

== Climate ==
The islands have a cool-temperate oceanic climate. Mean average temperatures at sea level range from 11.3° 14.5°C with little seasonal variation. Weather can change rapidly on the islands. Snow is rare at sea level, but can fall on the peaks between May and January. Tristan averages 1,676 mm of precipitation annually, while Gough receives 3,397 mm.

== Flora ==
The islands have main vegetation types, zoned by altitude and topography. Tussock grassland of Sporobolus mobberleyanus and Poa flabellata predominates in coastal areas with regular salt spray. Introduced grazing animals have largely eliminated Tristan's tussock grasslands, except along the eastern shore and in inaccessible areas.

Fern bush grows between 300 and 500 metres elevation. Dominant species include the fern Histiopteris incisa, the tree fern Blechnum palmiforme, and the island Cape myrtle (Phylica arborea), a shrub or low tree.

Wet heath extends up to 800 metres elevation. It includes B. palmiforme and other ferns, the shrub Empetrum rubrum, sedges, grasses, herbs, and mosses.

Peat bogs occupy depressions above 600 metres. Sphagnum moss predominates, with the reedlike Tetroncium magellanicum and sedges (Scirpus spp.).

Feldmark and montane rock communities are found in rocky and exposed areas above 600 metres elevation, composed of low cushion-forming and crevice plants.

The lower islands have fewer vegetation types. Inaccessible Island has tussock grassland, fern bush, and peat bogs, while Nightingale is mostly covered in dense tussock grassland.

The ecoregion has over sixty endemic plant taxa. Only four exotic plants are widespread on Gough Island. More exotic plants are found on Tristan.

== Fauna ==
The islands are important for seabirds. Over 20 species breeding on Gough, and many occur on Tristan as well. The Atlantic yellow-nosed albatross (Thalassarche chlororhynchos) ranges over the South Atlantic but breeds only on the ecoregion's islands. Other species include the Atlantic petrel (Pterodroma incerta), spectacled petrel (Procellaria conspicillata), Tristan albatross (Diomedea dabbenena), sooty albatross (Phoebetria fusca), and northern rockhopper penguin (Eudyptes moseleyi).

The three species of seed-eating tanagers in genus Nesospiza are endemic to the ecoregion: the Inaccessible Island finch (Nesospiza acunhae), Nightingale Island finch or Nightingale bunting (N. questi), and Wilkins's finch or Wilkins's bunting (N. wilkinsi).

Gough has two endemic land birds, the Gough moorhen (Gallinula comeri) which lives in fern bush and has been introduced to Tristan, and the Gough finch (Rowettia goughensis). The Tristan moorhen (Gallinula nesiotis) is extinct.

Inaccessible Island is home to the endemic Inaccessible Island rail (Laterallus rogersi) the world's smallest flightless bird.

The islands have no native land mammals, reptiles, amphibians, or freshwater fish.

== Protected areas ==
Gough and Inaccessible Islands are managed as a wildlife reserve (IUCN category I), and were designated a UNESCO World Heritage Site in 1995.

== See also ==
- Wildlife of Saint Helena, Ascension and Tristan da Cunha
