= Nightingale Islands =

Island group in Tristan da Cunha archipelago

Coordinates: 37.421°S 12.481°W

Location of the Nightingale Islands in the Atlantic Ocean

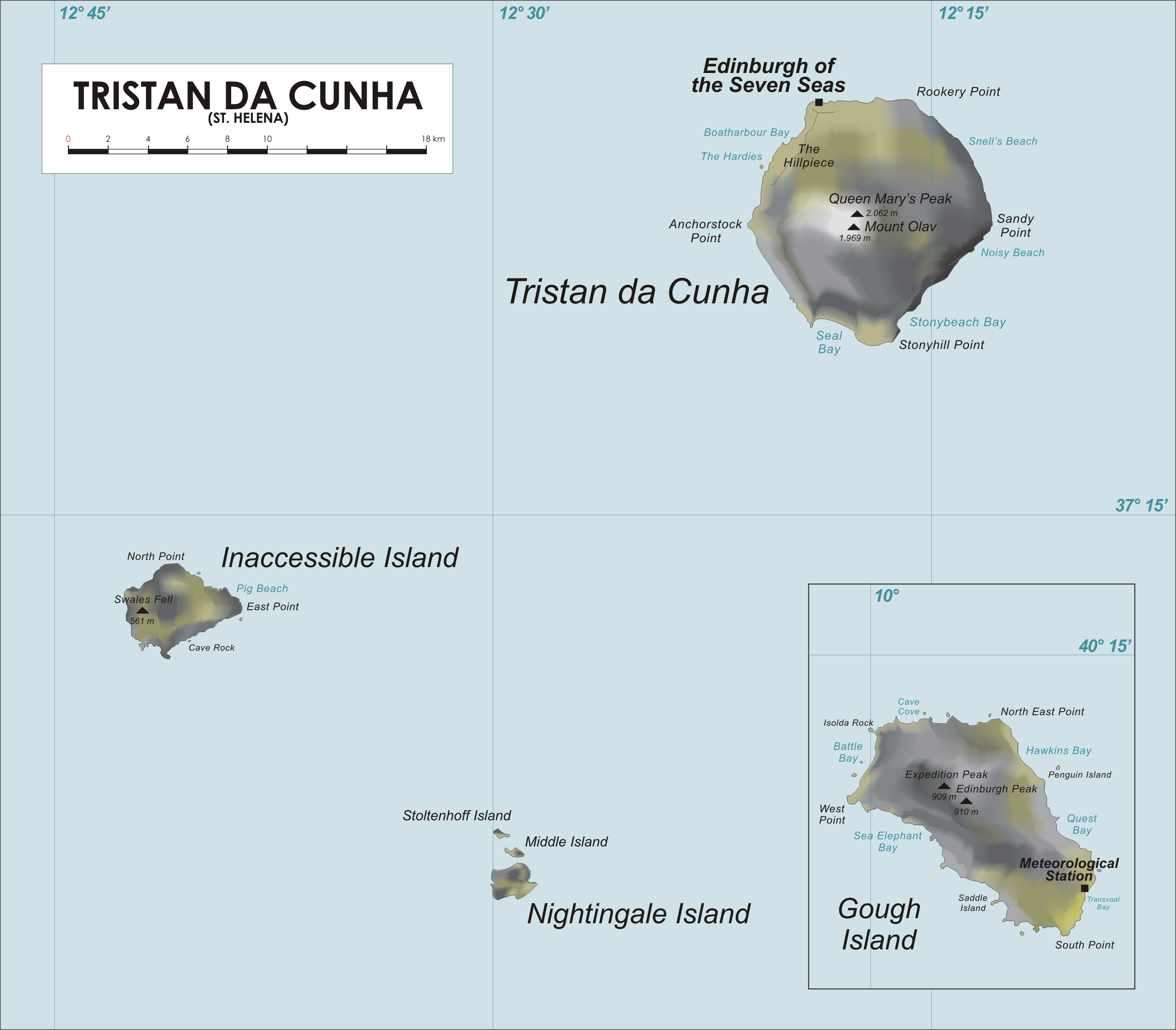
Map of Tristan da Cunha showing the Nightingale Islands and Inaccessible Island.

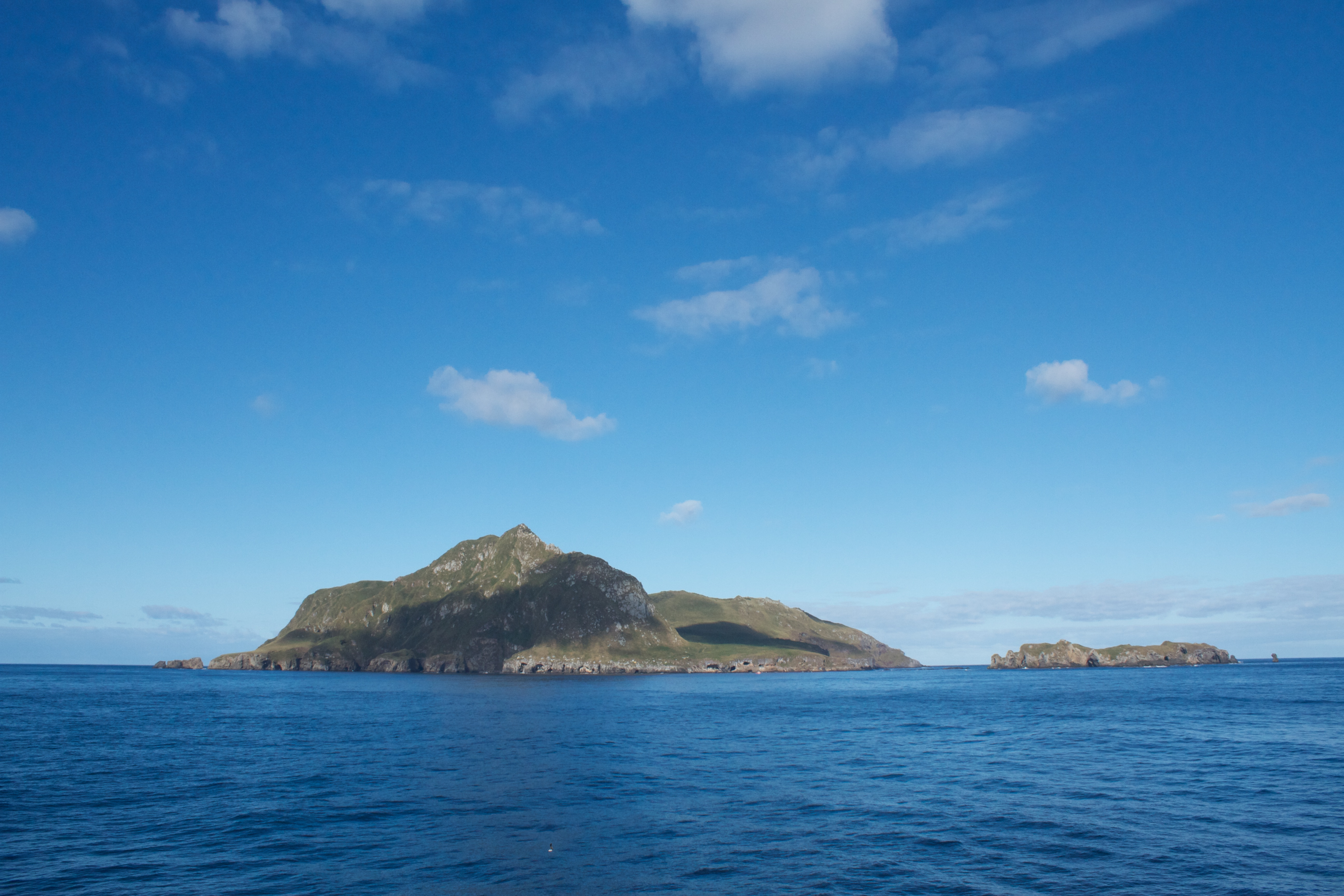
Nightingale Island

The Nightingale Islands are a group of three islands in the South Atlantic Ocean, part of the Tristan da Cunha territory. They consist of Nightingale Island, Middle Island and Stoltenhoff Island. The islands are administered by the United Kingdom as part of the overseas territory of Saint Helena, Ascension and Tristan da Cunha. The Nightingale Islands are uninhabited.

Nightingale Island is the smallest of the four main islands of the Tristan da Cunha Group, measuring only 4 square kilometres (1.5 sq mi), and lies 30 kilometres (18.6 mi) away from Tristan and 22 kilometres (13.7 mi) from Inaccessible. Stoltenhoff and Middle (also known as Alex Island), are really two large islets rather than conventional islands.

== Geology ==
The Nightingale Islands are the heavily eroded remnant of a once much larger stratovolcano. The oldest potassium–argon dating from the island is 18 ± 4 Ma. The most recent submarine eruption was in 2004. On August 29-30, 2004, earthquake swarms from the south flank of Nightingale island were recorded in Tristan da Cunha. This was subsequently followed by pumice rafting up on the shores of Tristan da Cunha. The youngest subaereal volcanic activity on the island is indirectly dated to 39,160^{+6,090}_{−3,410} uncalibrated years BP by radiocarbon dates on peat overlain by volcanic tuff.

== History ==
Originally named "Gebrooken (Broken) island" by the Dutch under Jan Jacobszoon in January 1656, they found no safe anchorage and did not make the first landing until 1696 (most likely by Willem de Vlamingh in August of that year). Frenchman D'Etchevery also visited the island in September 1767. Nightingale was renamed after British captain Gamaliel Nightingale in 1760.

Jonathan Lambert temporarily changed the name to "Lovel Island" in his 1811 proclamation in the Boston Gazette, but as with his other proposed changes (i.e. Tristan da Cunha Group to "Isles of Refreshment"), the name did not last.

== Wildlife ==
Nightingale, a tiny island, is home to more than three million pairs of seabirds at a density of around 1.3 pairs per square metre; almost the entire vegetated island is occupied. The Nightingale Island finch is found nowhere else in the world.

=== Important Bird Area ===
The Nightingale Islands group has been recognised internationally as part of the Tristan da Cunha Endemic Bird Area (EBA). It has also been identified as an Important Bird Area (IBA) by BirdLife International as a breeding site for seabirds and its endemic landbirds. Birds for which the IBA is significant include northern rockhopper penguins (up to 125,000 breeding pairs), sooty albatrosses (up to 250 pairs), Atlantic yellow-nosed albatrosses (5000 pairs), broad-billed prions (10,000 pairs), soft-plumaged petrels (up to 1000 pairs), great shearwaters (up to 3 million pairs), white-faced storm petrels (10,000 pairs), white-bellied storm petrels (1000 pairs), Antarctic terns (up to 400 pairs), southern skuas (up to 500 pairs), Tristan thrushes, Wilkins's buntings and Nightingale buntings. The nearby islands of Gough and Inaccessible Island have been recognised as Wetlands of International Importance under the Ramsar Convention.

=== Aquatic biodiversity ===
The islanders of Tristan da Cunha depend on the fish resource to a large extent for food and for bait for the local rock lobster industry. Approximately 61.5 tons of linefish are harvested each year for these purposes. The insular nature of the island ecosystem renders it vulnerable to over-exploitation from commercial fishing operations. Most of the fish species are bound to the islands for the completion of their life cycles; hence, the populations are more or less isolated and not supplemented by recruits from outside of the system.
