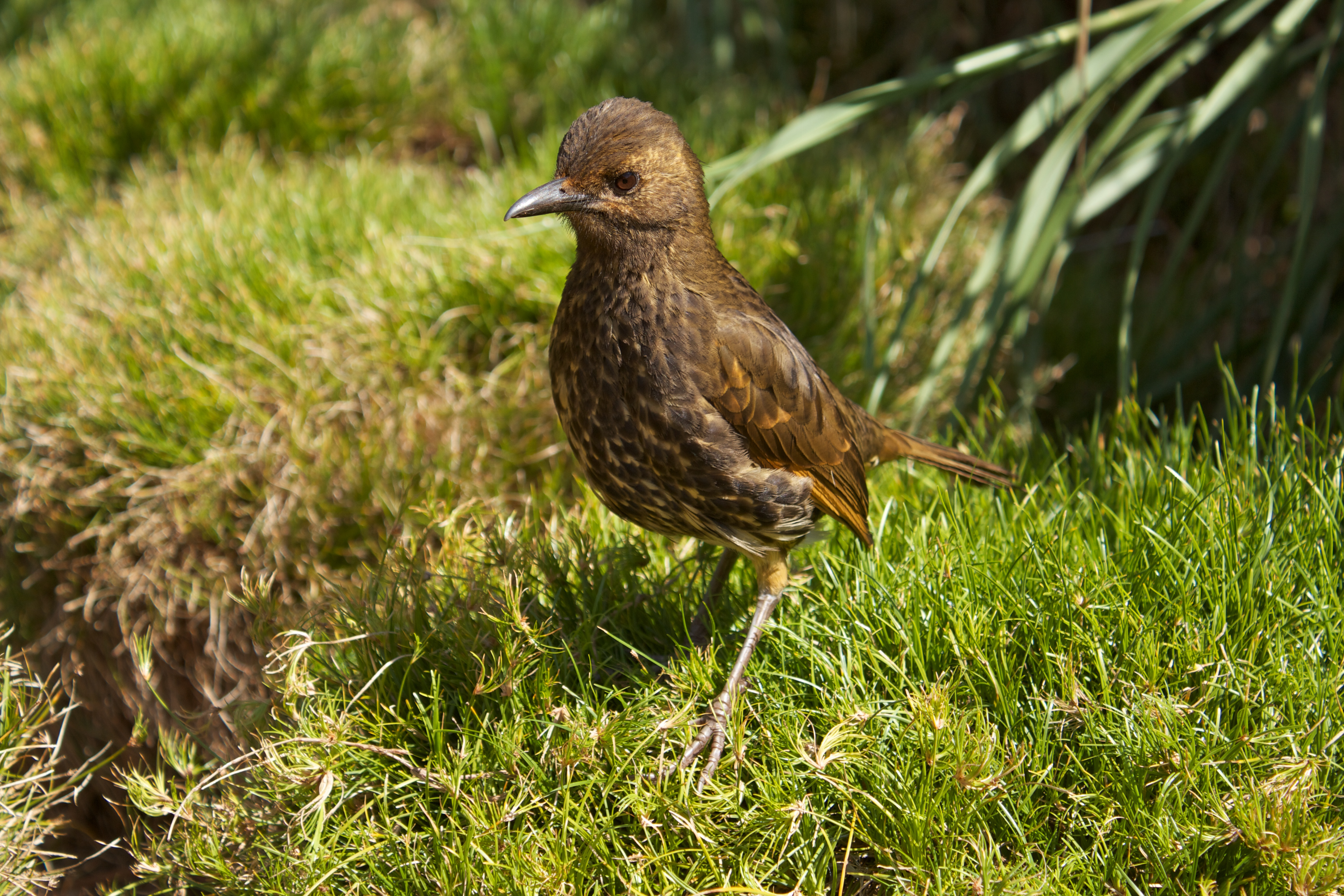
- On Nightingale Island

Conservation status
- Near Threatened (IUCN 3.1)

Scientific classification
- Kingdom: Animalia
- Phylum: Chordata
- Class: Aves
- Order: Passeriformes
- Family: Turdidae
- Genus: Turdus
- Species: T. eremita

Binomial name
- Turdus eremita (Gould, 1855)

Synonyms
- Nesocichla eremita Gould, 1855

= Tristan thrush =

Species of bird

The Tristan thrush (Turdus eremita), also known as the starchy, is a species of bird in the thrush family that is endemic to the British overseas territories of the isolated Tristan da Cunha archipelago in the South Atlantic Ocean.

The isolation of its habitat forced the Tristan thrush to adapt to its current niche: the species is known to scavenge, and also predate on eggs and even other birds of its size class, though it also feeds on more typical fare such as invertebrates and plant matter.

== Description ==
The bird was described by John Gould as being similar in size and appearance to the song thrush, and by Henry Moseley as like a very dark-coloured song thrush. However, it also has the short rounded wings and reduced keel indicative of a reduced need for flight, typical of bird species adapted to life on small islands.

This thrush typically has a length of about 22 cm (8.7 in). The nominate subspecies from Tristan differs from that from Nightingale Island, with the Tristan birds being warm dark brown on the upperparts rather than dull sooty-brown, rufous rather than dark fuscous on the sides of the head, and rufous-brown, rather than brownish-black, on the underparts. Birds from Inaccessible Island appear to be intermediate, with the sides of the head of a specimen from there speckled both rufous and fuscous.

== Distribution and habitat ==
The thrush is found on Tristan, Inaccessible, Nightingale, Middle and Stoltenhoff Islands in the Tristan group. It uses all the natural habitats available on the islands, including rocky shorelines, tussock grassland, fern-dominated shrubland and wet heathland.

== Taxonomy ==
The thrush is thought to have evolved from an ancestor in the genus Turdus from South America, and resembles an immature austral thrush, but its adaptations to life on a small island group, including an unusual brush-tipped tongue modified for extracting the contents of eggs, have been used as reasons to warrant its separation into the monotypic genus Nesocichla. However, molecular analysis has indicated that not only is it part of a South American clade of Turdus, but also that it falls squarely within that genus.

There are three subspecies, the ranges of which correspond to the three main islands in the group:

- Turdus eremita eremita Gould, 1855 (Tristan da Cunha)
- Turdus eremita gordoni Stenhouse, 1924 (Inaccessible Island)
- Turdus eremita procax Elliott, 1954 (Nightingale, Middle and Stoltenhoff Islands)

== Behaviour ==
=== Breeding ===
The thrush breeds from September to February. Its cup-shaped nest is woven from strands of grasses and other vegetation, and sited on or close to the ground. It lays a clutch of two or three, occasionally four, eggs. The fledging period is about 20 days.

=== Feeding ===
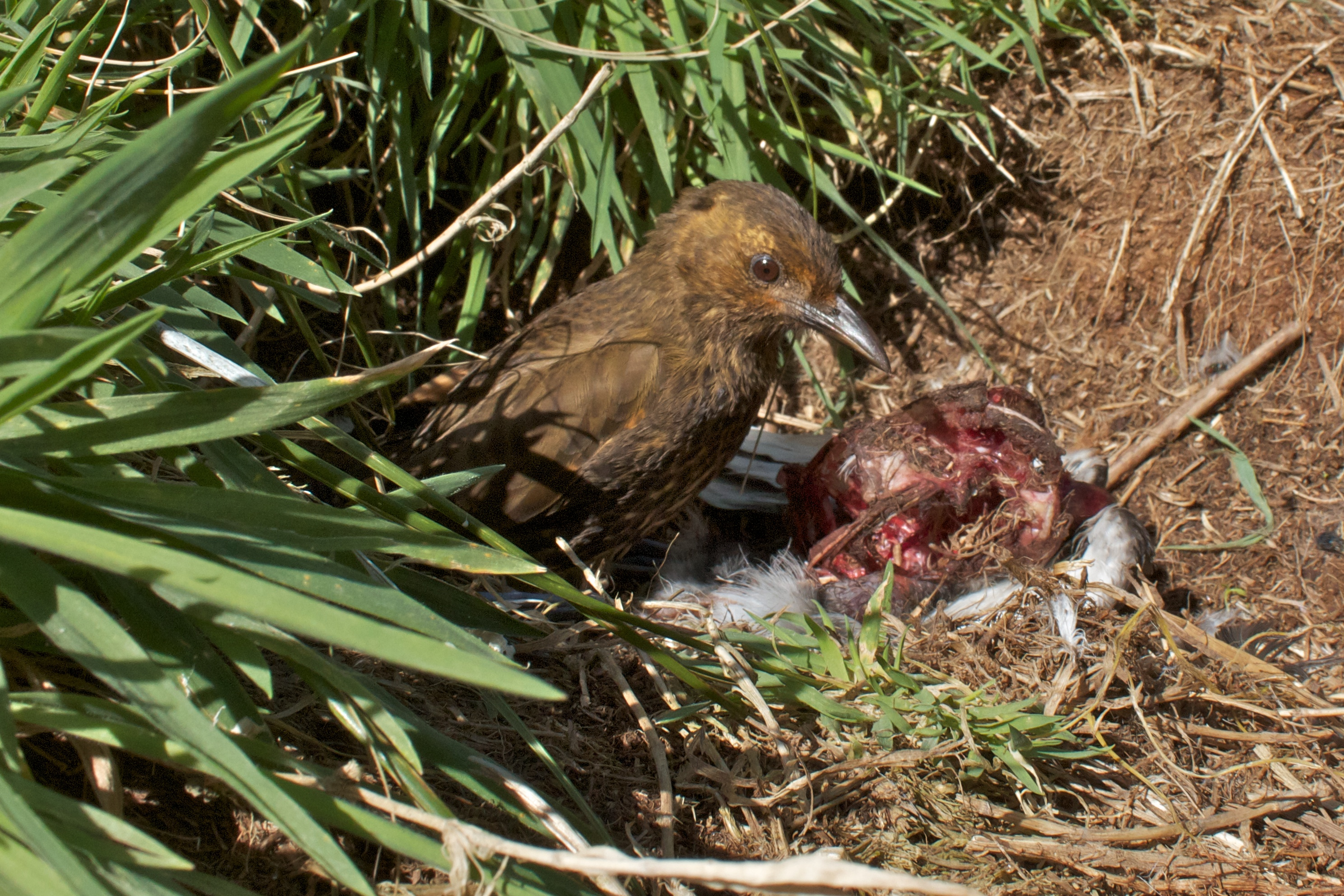
Scavenging a dead bird on Nightingale Island

An opportunistic omnivore and scavenger, the thrush feeds on earthworms and other invertebrates of the soil and leaf litter, as well as on carrion, berries, the eggs and fledglings of other birds, and kitchen scraps.

A 2010 paper published by Peter Ryan and Rob Ronconi in the journal Ardea reported on the predatory habits of the thrush: they observed Tristan thrushes breaking open an egg of the Atlantic yellow-nosed albatross, and also noted the thrush is a regular predator of eggs and small chicks of the great shearwater, being responsible for almost half of the egg losses by that species during the early incubation period in a colony on Inaccessible Island. They saw evidence that the thrushes remove eggs of the spectacled petrel (a breeding endemic of Inaccessible Island) from their nesting burrows. The thrushes are also known to kill both white-bellied and white-faced storm petrels directly, probably by taking them from their burrows. Furthermore, they have been observed to drink blood from penguins. The thrushes will also prey on chicks and the occasional adults of the Inaccessible Island rail. With the exception of seabirds such as the brown skua and rare vagrant raptors, the Tristan thrush is the largest terrestrial predator on Tristan da Cunha, occupying a unique position in its ecosystem for a songbird.

== Status and conservation ==
The thrush is classified as near threatened because it has a small population with a restricted range. Predation by black rats on Tristan is an ongoing threat, though the other islands it occupies are rat-free. The feral cats that previously occupied Tristan have been eradicated. Conservation recommendations by BirdLife International are to continue regular population monitoring, to control rats on Tristan, and to prevent further introductions of mammalian predators.

=== Population ===
A survey in 1972–1974 estimated the separate island populations as Tristan 40–60 pairs, Inaccessible 100–500 pairs, Nightingale 300–500 pairs, Middle 20–40 pairs and Stoltenhoff 10–20 pairs. In the 1980s the population of Inaccessible Island was revised to 850 pairs, and the total population for the whole group to about 6,000 individual birds. More recently, the number of birds on Tristan has been roughly estimated at several hundred. The population is stable with no evidence of decline in numbers or range.
