= Isolepis bicolor =

Conservation status
- Least Concern (IUCN 3.1)

Scientific classification
- Kingdom: Plantae
- Clade: Tracheophytes
- Clade: Angiosperms
- Clade: Monocots
- Clade: Commelinids
- Order: Poales
- Family: Cyperaceae
- Genus: Isolepis
- Species: I. bicolor

Binomial name
- Isolepis bicolor (Carmich.) Spreng.

Synonyms
- Scirpus bicolor (Carmich.) Spreng.

Species of grass-like plant

Isolepis bicolor is a species of plant in the sedge family, Cyperaceae. The plant is endemic to Tristan da Cunha, Nightingale Island, Inaccessible Island and Gough Island. Its natural habitats are subantarctic forests, subantarctic shrubland, and swamps.
