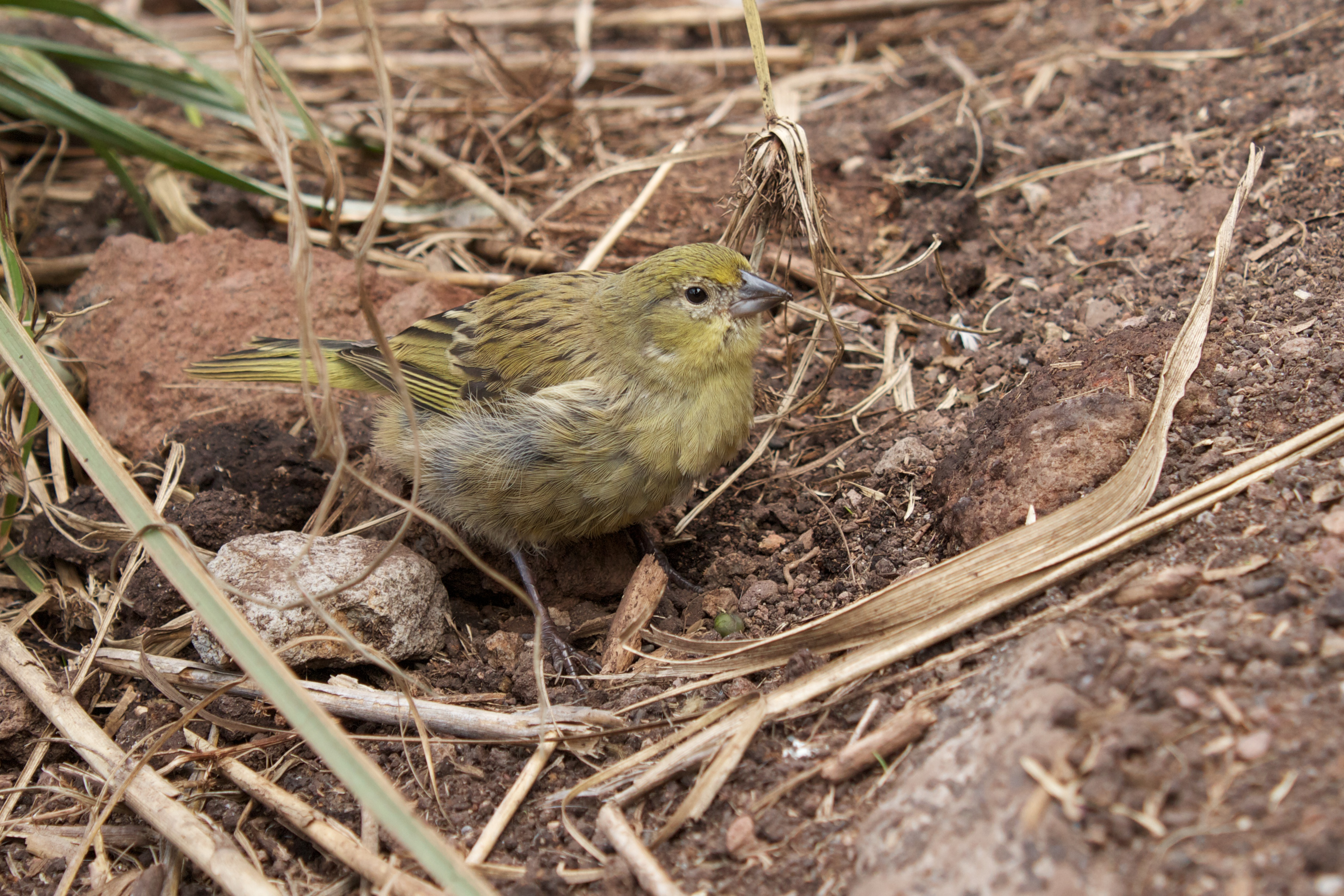
- On Inaccessible Island

Conservation status
- Vulnerable (IUCN 3.1)

Scientific classification
- Kingdom: Animalia
- Phylum: Chordata
- Class: Aves
- Order: Passeriformes
- Family: Thraupidae
- Genus: Nesospiza
- Species: N. acunhae

Binomial name
- Nesospiza acunhae Cabanis, 1873

= Inaccessible Island finch =

Species of bird

The Inaccessible Island finch (Nesospiza acunhae), also known as the Inaccessible bunting, is a species of bird in the family Thraupidae (formerly in Emberizidae).

It is endemic to Inaccessible Island of the Tristan da Cunha archipelago, where its natural habitats are temperate shrubland and subantarctic grassland. It is threatened by habitat loss.

== Taxonomy and systematics ==
The Inaccessible Island finch was previously considered two species, but the three subspecies are now grouped together.

=== Subspecies ===
The subspecies of this species are:

N. a. acunhae Cabanis, 1873. Found along the coastline, and has a small beak and drab olive-grey plumage, though the male is slightly brighter than the female.

N. a. dunnei Hagen, 1952. Found on the eastern edge of the island's plateau and the coastline, and has a large beak. It is larger than the other subspecies.

N. a. fraseri Ryan, 2008. Found on the island's plateau at 300–600 meters (980–1,970 ft), and has a small beak and bright yellow plumage. It has a large head and long wings.

== Description ==
It ranges from 17 to 21 cm (6.7 to 8.3 in) in length and weighs 24 to 49 g (0.8 to 1.7 oz). All subspecies are some shade of olive-green. The call is a repeated series of three to four notes.

== Diet ==
The Inaccessible Island finch eats mainly seeds and insects. The plants consumed vary by subspecies. N. a. acunhae eats the seeds of Spartinia grasses, such as Sporobolus arundinacea, as well as Carex. N. a. fraseri feeds on Nertera. N.a. dunnei feeds on Phylica. All subspecies of N. acunhae use flies as their main source of prey.

== Reproduction ==
It breeds from November to February. They are usually monogamous, and partners remain together for successive breeding attempts. Females lay one or two eggs in a cup nest close to the ground.
