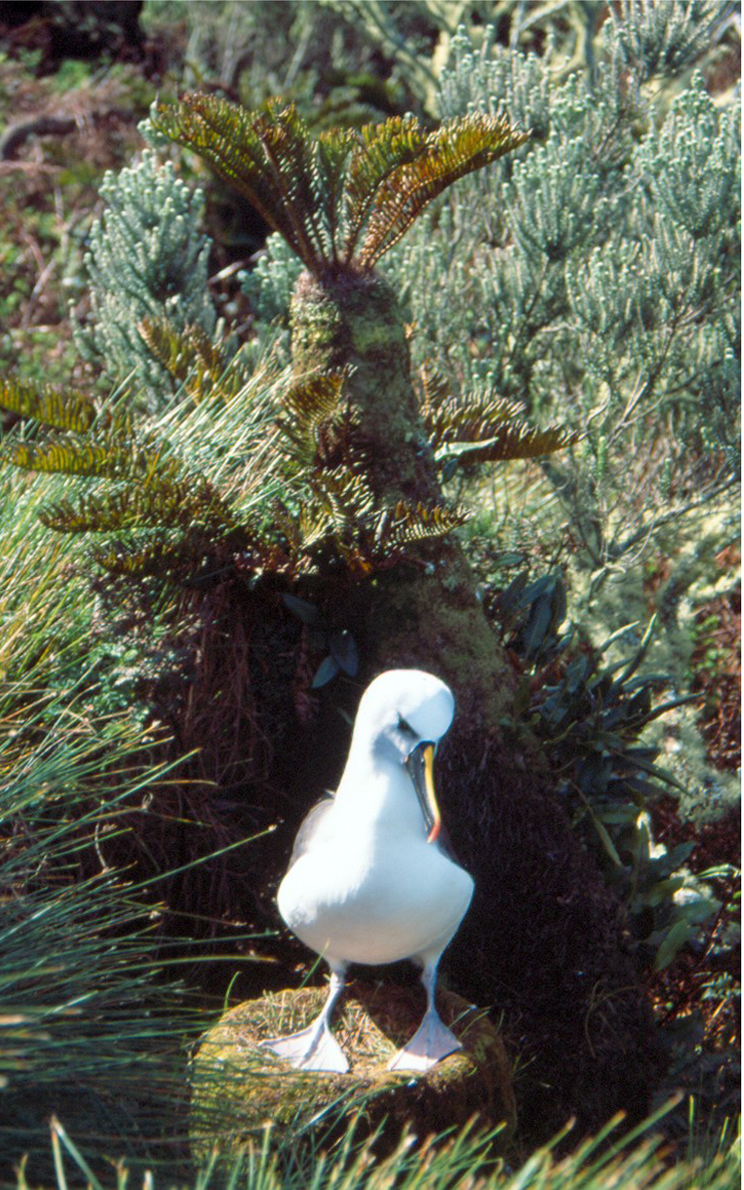

Conservation status
- Endangered (IUCN 3.1)

Scientific classification
- Kingdom: Animalia
- Phylum: Chordata
- Class: Aves
- Order: Procellariiformes
- Family: Diomedeidae
- Genus: Thalassarche
- Species: T. chlororhynchos

Binomial name
- Thalassarche chlororhynchos (Gmelin, JF, 1789)

Synonyms
- Thalassarche chlororhynchos chlororhynchos

= Atlantic yellow-nosed albatross =

Species of seabird from the south Atlantic

The Atlantic yellow-nosed albatross (Thalassarche chlororhynchos) is a large seabird in the albatross family Diomedeidae.

This small mollymawk was once considered conspecific with the Indian yellow-nosed albatross and known as the yellow-nosed albatross. Some authorities still consider these taxa to be conspecific, such as the Clements checklist and the SACC, which recognizes that a proposal is needed.

== Taxonomy ==
The Atlantic yellow-nosed albatross was formally described in 1789 by the German naturalist Johann Friedrich Gmelin in his revised and expanded edition of Carl Linnaeus's Systema Naturae. He placed it with the albatrosses in the genus Diomedea and coined the binomial name Diomedea chlororhynchos. Gmelin based his description on the "yellow-nosed albatross" that had been described and illustrated in 1785 by the English ornithologist John Latham from a specimen that had been collected off the coast of the Cape of Good Hope. The Atlantic yellow-nosed albatross is now one of nine species placed in the genus Thalassarche that was introduced in 1853 by the German naturalist Ludwig Reichenbach. The genus name combines the Ancient Greek thalassa meaning "sea" and arkhē meaning "power" or "command" (from arkhō, to govern). The specific epithet chlororhynchos combines the Ancient Greek khlōros meaning "yellow" with rhunkhos meaning "bill". The species is monotypic: no subspecies are recognised.

== Description ==
The Atlantic yellow-nosed albatross averages 81 cm (32 in) in length. It is a typical black and white mollymawk with a grey head and large eye patch, and its nape and hindneck are white. Its bill is black with a yellow culminicorn and a pink tip. It has a blackish grey saddle, tail and upperwing, and its underparts are predominantly white. Its underwing and primaries show a narrow black margin. The juvenile is similar to the adult but with a white head and black bill. It can be differentiated from the Indian yellow-nosed by its darker head. Relative to other mollymawks it can be distinguished by its smaller size (the wings being particularly narrow) and the thin black edging to the underwing, The grey-headed albatross has a similar grey head but more extensive and less well defined black markings around the edge of the underwing. Salvin's albatross also has a grey head but has much broader wings, a pale bill and even narrower black borders to the underwing.

== Distribution ==
Atlantic yellow-nosed albatrosses nest on islands in the mid-Atlantic, including Tristan da Cunha (Inaccessible Island, Middle Island, Nightingale Island, Stoltenhoff Island) and Gough Island. At sea they range across the south Atlantic from South America to Africa between 15°S and 45°S.

== Behaviour ==
=== Feeding ===
This mollymawk feeds on squid, fish, cuttlefish and crustacea. The yellow-nosed Albatross sometimes hunts at night instead of day.

=== Breeding ===
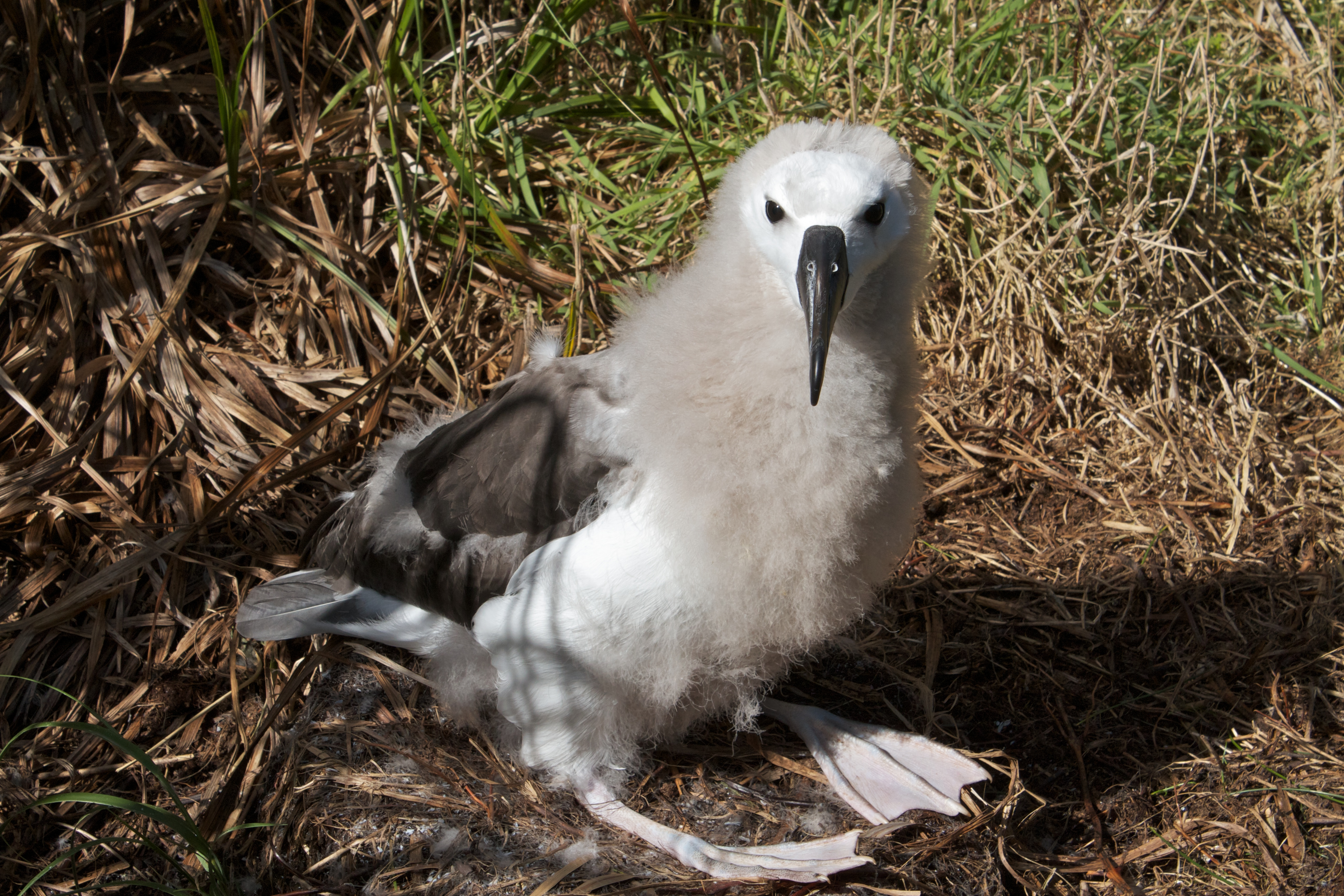
Juvenile on Nightingale Island

Like all albatrosses they are colonial, but unusually they will build their nests in scrubs, on top of cliffs amongst Blechnum tree ferns. Like all mollymawks they build pedestal nests of mud, peat, feathers, and vegetation to lay their one egg in. They do this in September or early October, and the chick fledges in late March to April. They breed annually.

== Conservation ==
Breeding Population and Trends
Location	Population	Date	Trend
Gough Island	5,300 pairs	2001	Stable
Tristan da Cunha Island	16,000–30,000 pairs	1974	Stable
Nightingale Island	4,500 pairs	1974	Declining
Middle Island	100–200 pairs	1974	
Stoltenhoff Island	500 pairs	1974	
Inaccessible Island	1,100 pairs	1983	Declining
Total	55,000-83,200	2001	Declining

The IUCN list this species as endangered, with an occurrence range of 16,800,000 km^{2} (6,500,000 sq mi) and a breeding range of 80 km^{2} (31 sq mi). A 2001 population estimate breaks down the population and shows some trends. Gough Island has 5,300 breeding pairs, between 16,000 and 30,000 breeding pairs on Tristan da Cunha Island, 4,500 on Nightingale Island, between 100 and 200 pairs on Middle Island, and 500 pairs on Stoltenhoff Island, and 1,100 on Inaccessible Island. This adds up to between 27,500 and 41,600 pairs per year for the total between 55,000 and 83,200 total adult birds. This population estimate was done in 1983, however and is outdated. Trends suggest a 50% decrease over 72 years.

The largest threat is from longline fishing, as harvesting of chicks and adults has been outlawed.

Efforts to help conserve this bird are underway, with counting of the birds on Gough Island. Also, Gough Island and Inaccessible Island are nature preserves, and Gough Island is a World Heritage Site. The Tristan da Cunha population is being remotely tracked and counted, and the South East Atlantic Fisheries Commission has passed a resolution that all fishing vessels use a tori line and drop lines at night.

== Sources ==
- BirdLife International (2008). "Atlantic Yellow-nosed Albatross Thalassarche chlororhynchos - BirdLife Species Factsheet". Data Zone.
- Brooke, M. (2004). "Procellariidae". Albatrosses And Petrels Across The World. Oxford, UK: Oxford University Press. ISBN 0-19-850125-0.
- Clements, James (2007). The Clements Checklist of the Birds of the World (6th ed.). Ithaca, NY: Cornell University Press. ISBN 978-0-8014-4501-9.
- Cuthbert, R.; Sommer, E. S. (March 2004). "Population size and trends of four globally threatened seabirds at Gough Island, South Atlantic Ocean". Ornithol: 97–103.
- Double, M. C. (2003). "Procellariiformes (Tubenosed Seabirds)". In Hutchins, Michael; Jackson, Jerome A.; Bock, Walter J.; Olendorf, Donna (eds.). Grzimek's Animal Life Encyclopedia. 8. Vol. Birds I Tinamous and Ratites to Hoatzins. Joseph E. Trumpey, Chief Scientific Illustrator (2nd ed.). Farmington Hills, MI: Gale Group. pp. 107–111. ISBN 0-7876-5784-0.
- Remsen Jr., J. V.; et al. (7 Aug 2008). "A classification of the bird species of South America, South American Classification Committee, American Ornithologists' Union". South American Classification Committee. American Ornithologists' Union. Archived from the original on 2 March 2009.
- Fraser, M. W.; Ryan, P. G.; Watkins, B. P. (1988). "The seabirds of Inaccessible Island, South Atlantic Ocean". Cormorant (16): 7–33.
- Richardson, M. E. (1984). "Aspects of the ornithology of the Tristan da Cunha group and Gough Island, 1972-1974". Cormorant (12): 123–201.
