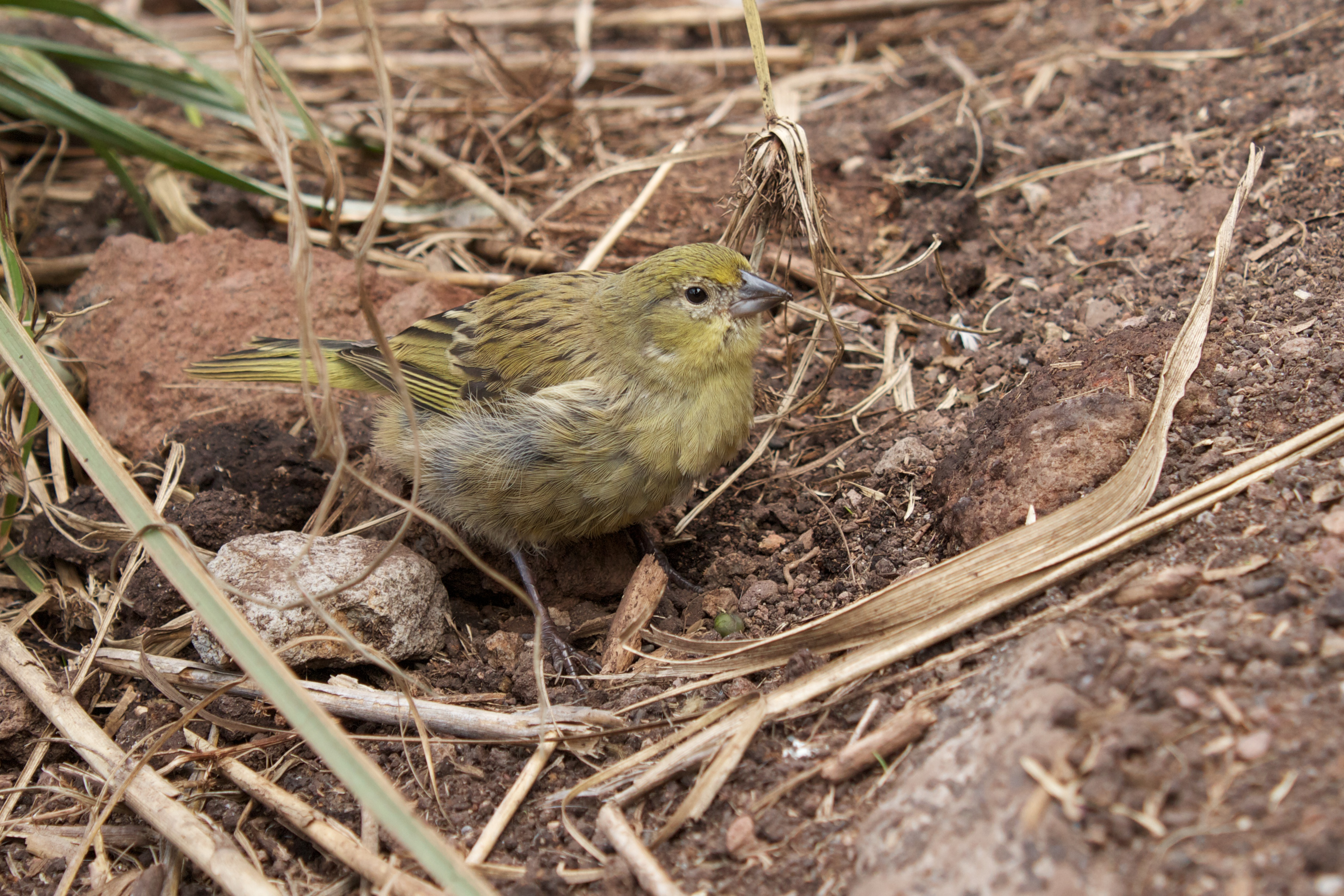
- Inaccessible Island Finch (Nesospiza acunhae)

Scientific classification
- Kingdom: Animalia
- Phylum: Chordata
- Class: Aves
- Order: Passeriformes
- Family: Thraupidae
- Genus: Nesospiza; Cabanis, 1873

Type species
- Nesospiza acunhae Cabanis, 1873

Species
- See text

= Nesospiza =

Genus of birds

Nesospiza is a genus of seed-eating birds in the tanager family Thraupidae found on the Tristan da Cunha archipelago in the South Atlantic Ocean.

== Taxonomy and species list ==
The genus Nesospiza was introduced in 1873 by the German ornithologist Jean Cabanis with the Inaccessible Island finch as the type species. The genus name combines the Ancient Greek nēsos meaning "island" (i.e. Tristan da Cunha) with spiza meaning "finch". The genus now contains three species.

Image	Scientific name	Common name	Distribution
	Nesospiza acunhae	Inaccessible Island finch	Tristan da Cunha archipelago
	Nesospiza questi	Nightingale Island finch	Nightingale Island of the Tristan da Cunha archipelago
	Nesospiza wilkinsi	Wilkins's finch	Tristan da Cunha archipelago
