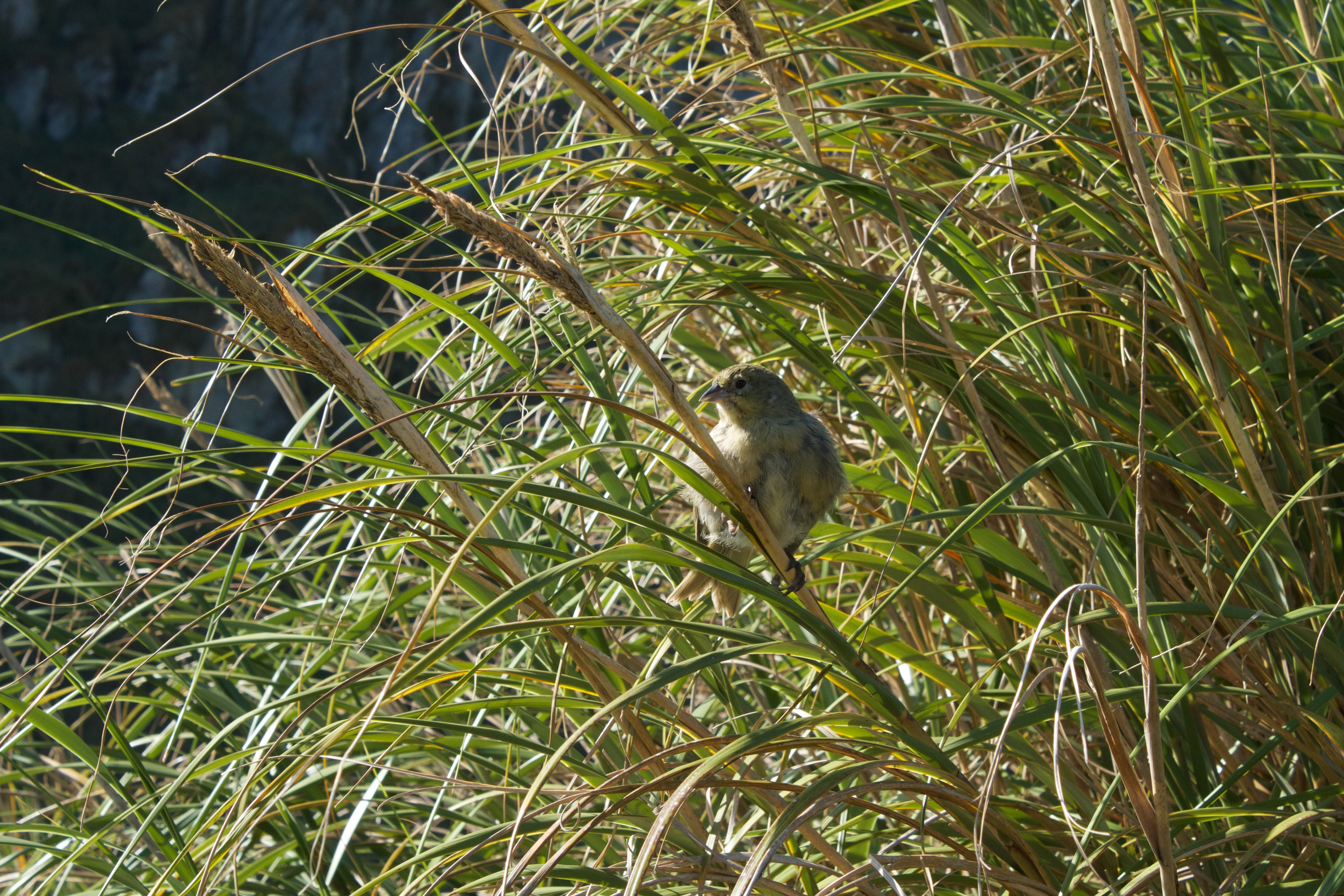

Conservation status
- Vulnerable (IUCN 3.1)

Scientific classification
- Kingdom: Animalia
- Phylum: Chordata
- Class: Aves
- Order: Passeriformes
- Family: Thraupidae
- Genus: Nesospiza
- Species: N. questi

Binomial name
- Nesospiza questi Lowe, 1923

= Nightingale Island finch =

Species of bird

The Nightingale Island finch (Nesospiza questi) is a species of bird in the family Thraupidae (formerly in Emberizidae).

It is endemic to Nightingale Island of the Tristan da Cunha archipelago, where its natural habitats are temperate shrubland and subantarctic grassland. It is threatened by habitat loss.
