= Wilkins's finch =

Conservation status
- Critically Endangered (IUCN 3.1)

Scientific classification
- Kingdom: Animalia
- Phylum: Chordata
- Class: Aves
- Order: Passeriformes
- Family: Thraupidae
- Genus: Nesospiza
- Species: N. wilkinsi

Binomial name
- Nesospiza wilkinsi Lowe, 1923

Species of bird

Wilkins's Bunting (Nesospiza wilkinsi), also known as the grosbeak bunting, is a species of bird in the family Thraupidae. It is restricted to Inaccessible Island (subspecies dunnei) and Nightingale Island (nominate wilkinsi) of the Tristan da Cunha archipelago, part of the British overseas territory of Saint Helena, Ascension and Tristan da Cunha in the South Atlantic Ocean. Its natural habitats are temperate shrubland and subantarctic grassland.

The common name and Latin binomial commemorate the Australian polar explorer and ornithologist Captain Sir George Hubert Wilkins.
