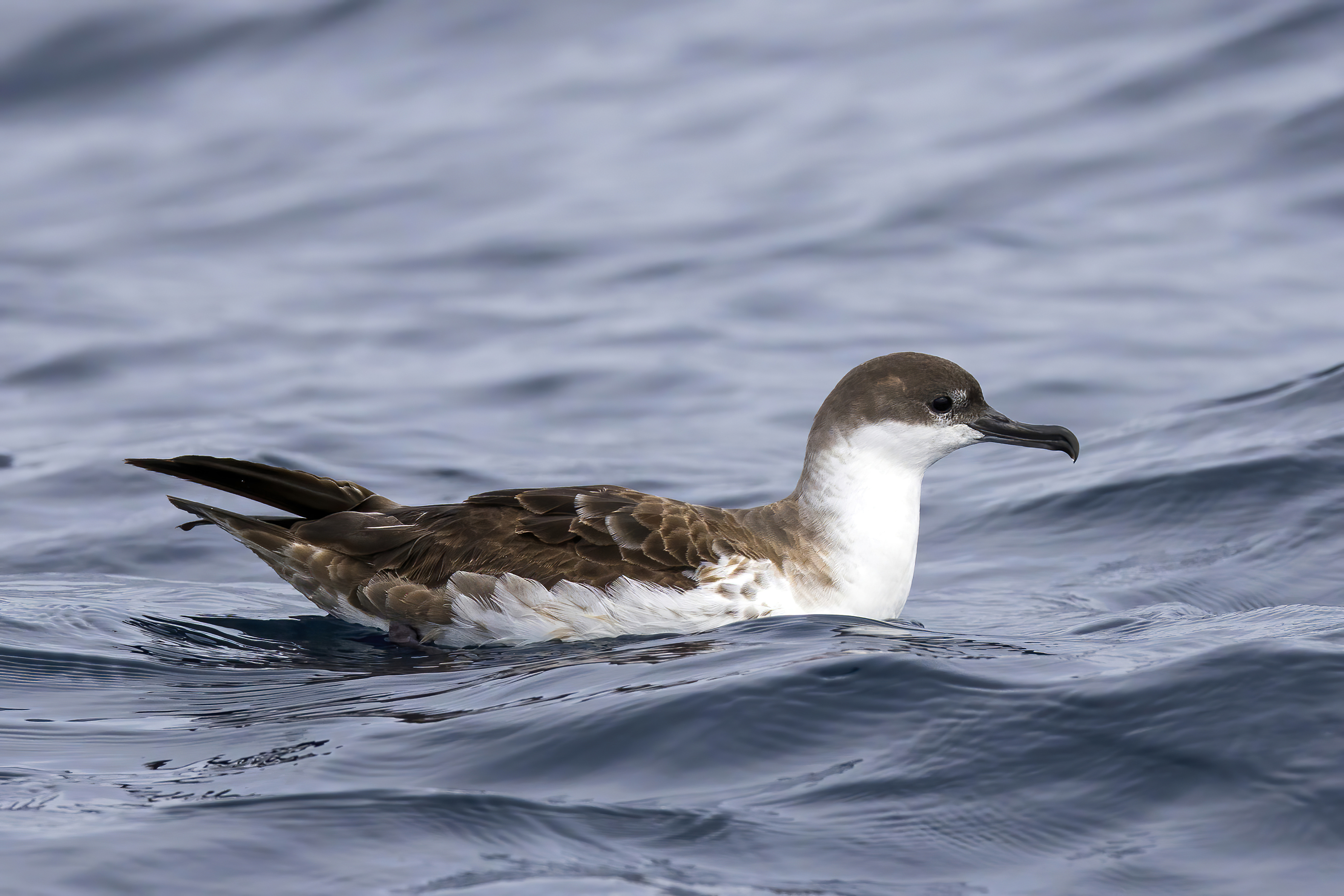
- Ten miles off Sagres, Portugal

Conservation status
- Least Concern (IUCN 3.1)

Scientific classification
- Kingdom: Animalia
- Phylum: Chordata
- Class: Aves
- Order: Procellariiformes
- Family: Procellariidae
- Genus: Ardenna
- Species: A. gravis

Binomial name
- Ardenna gravis (O'Reilly, 1818)

Synonyms
- Procellaria gravis O'Reilly, 1818; Puffinus gravis (protonym)

= Great shearwater =

Species of bird

The great shearwater (Ardenna gravis) is a large shearwater in the seabird family Procellariidae. It breeds colonially on rocky islands in the South Atlantic. Outside the breeding season it ranges widely in the Atlantic.

== Taxonomy ==
The great shearwater was formally described in 1818 by the Irish naturalist Bernard O'Reilly and given the binomial name Procellaria gravis. The great shearwater is now placed in the genus Ardenna that was introduced in 1853 by Ludwig Reichenbach. The genus name Ardenna was used to refer to a seabird by Italian naturalist Ulisse Aldrovandi in 1603. The specific epithet gravis is Latin meaning "heavy" or "weighty". The species is monotypic: no subspecies are recognised.

== Description ==
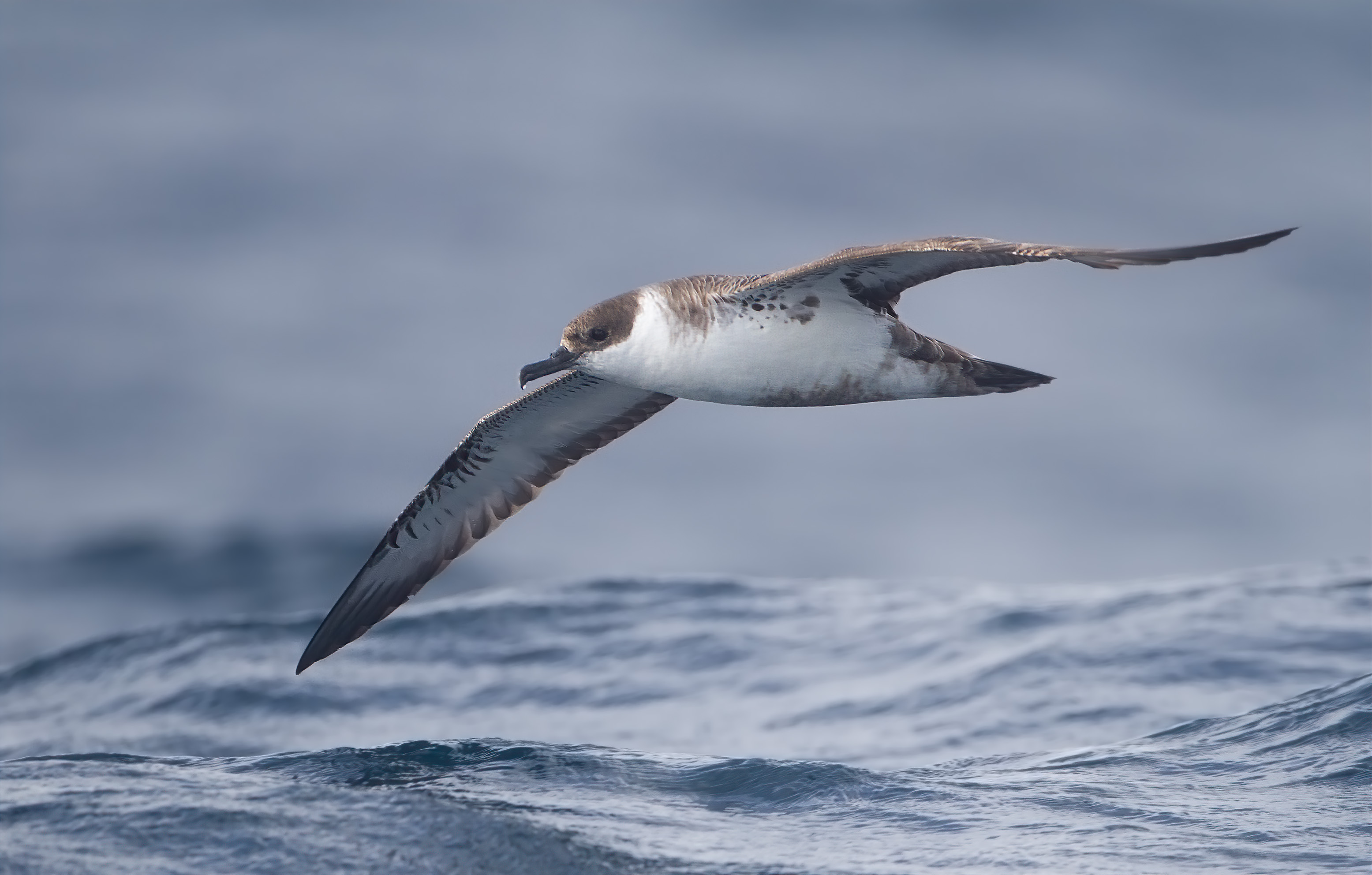
In flight

This shearwater is 43–51 cm (16.9–20.1 in) in length with a 105–122 cm (3.5–4.0 ft) wingspan. It is identifiable by its size, dark upper parts, and white under parts, with the exception of a brown belly patch and dark shoulder markings. It has a black cap, black bill, and a white "horseshoe" on the base of the tail. The stiff flight, like a large Manx shearwater, is also distinctive. The only other large shearwaters in its range are the Cory's Shearwater and the all-dark Sooty Shearwater.

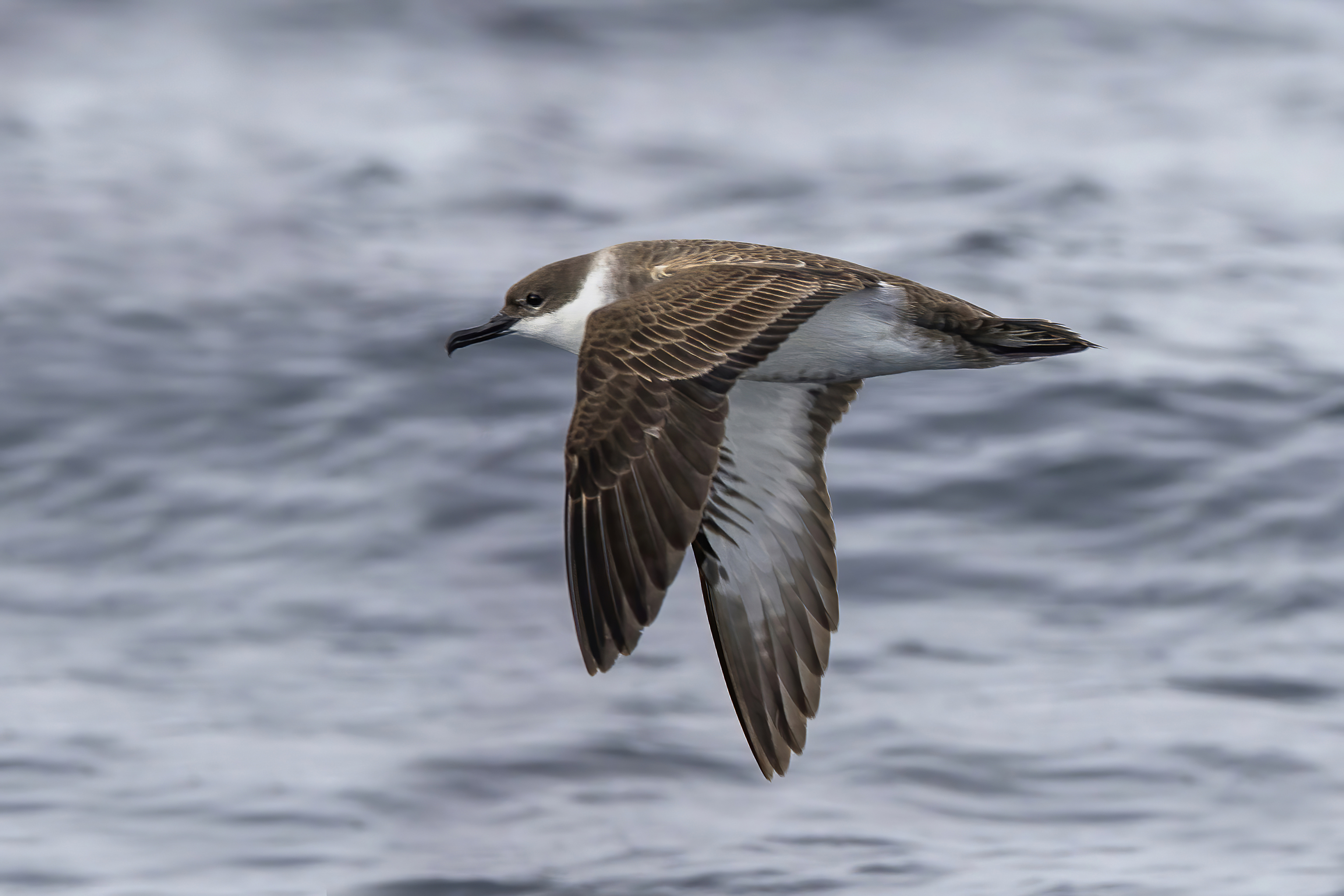
Wing upperside

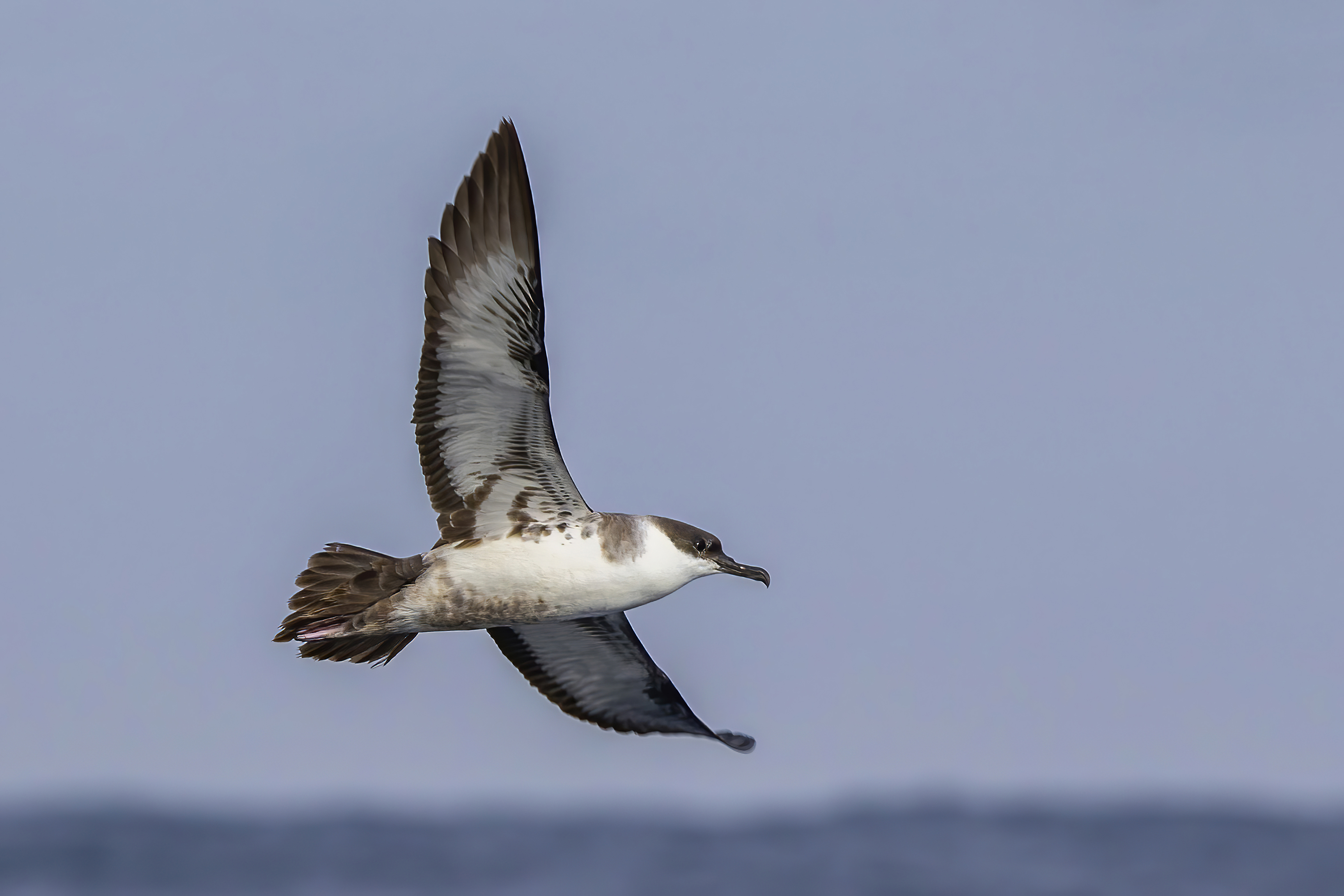
Wing underside

== Distribution and habitat ==
The great shearwater, like the sooty shearwater, follows a circular migration route, moving north up the eastern seaboard of first South and then North America, before crossing the Atlantic in August. It can be quite common off the southwestern coasts of Great Britain and Ireland before heading back south again, this time down the eastern littoral of the Atlantic.

== Behaviour and ecology ==
This bird has the typically "shearing" flight of the genus, dipping from side to side on stiff wings with few wingbeats, the wingtips almost touching the water. Its flight is powerful and direct, with wings held stiff and straight.

=== Breeding ===
This species breeds on Nightingale Island, Inaccessible Island, Tristan da Cunha, and Gough Island. It is one of only a few bird species to migrate from breeding grounds in the Southern Hemisphere to the Northern Hemisphere, the normal pattern being the other way around. This shearwater nests in large colonies, laying one white egg in a small burrow or in the open grass. These nests are visited only at night to avoid predation by large gulls.

=== Food and feeding ===
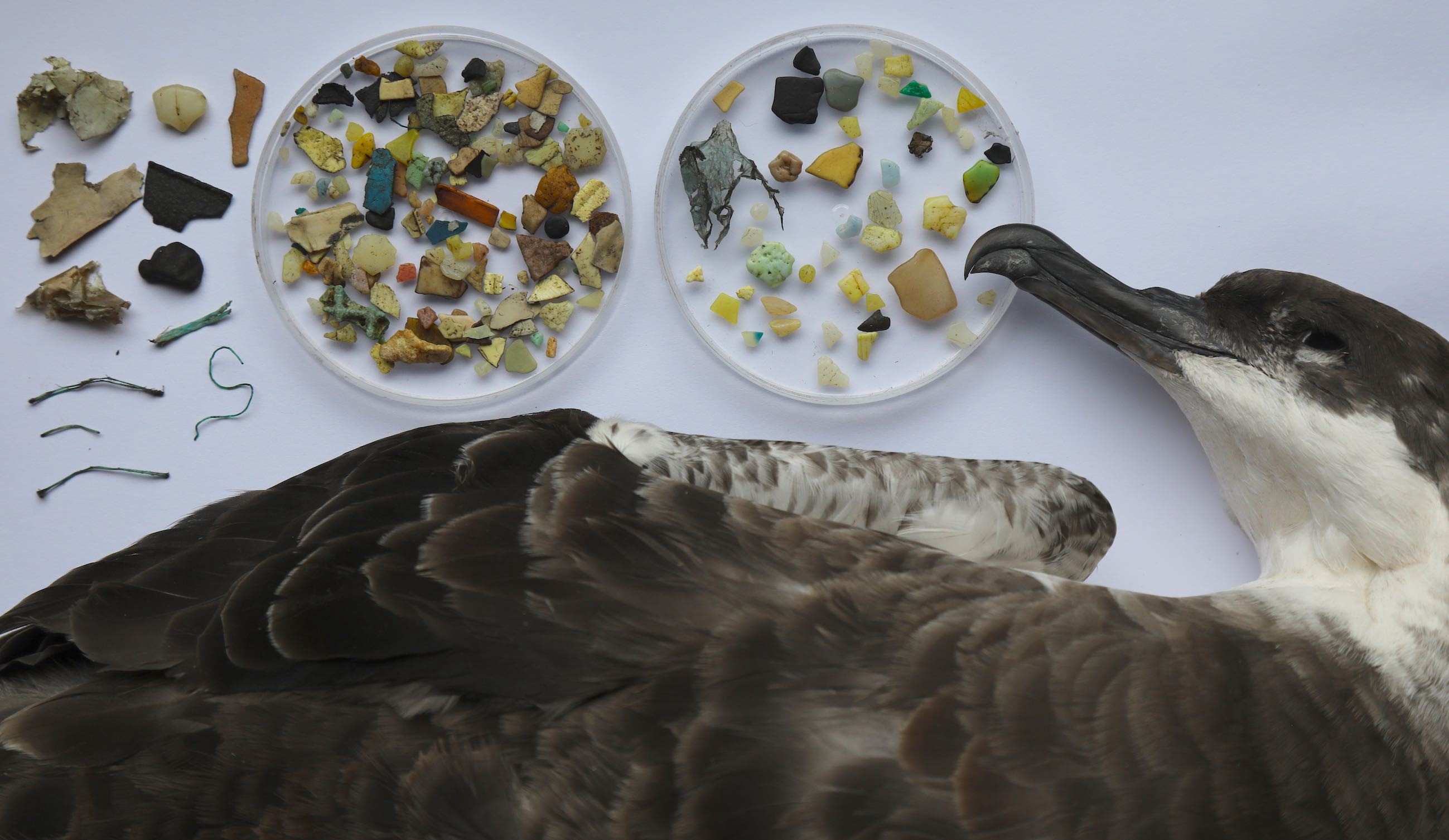
Great shearwater with plastic fragments found in its stomach

The great shearwater feeds on fish and squid, which it catches from the surface or by plunge-diving. It occasionally feeds on crustaceans, fish entrails and other refuse discarded by fishing vessels. It readily follows fishing boats, where it indulges in noisy squabbles. This is a gregarious species, which can be seen in large numbers from ships or appropriate headlands. They have a piercing "eeyah" cry usually given when resting in groups on the water.

Great shearwaters are among the seabird species with the highest incidence of plastic ingestion.
