= Nightingale Island =

Volcanic island in the South Atlantic Ocean

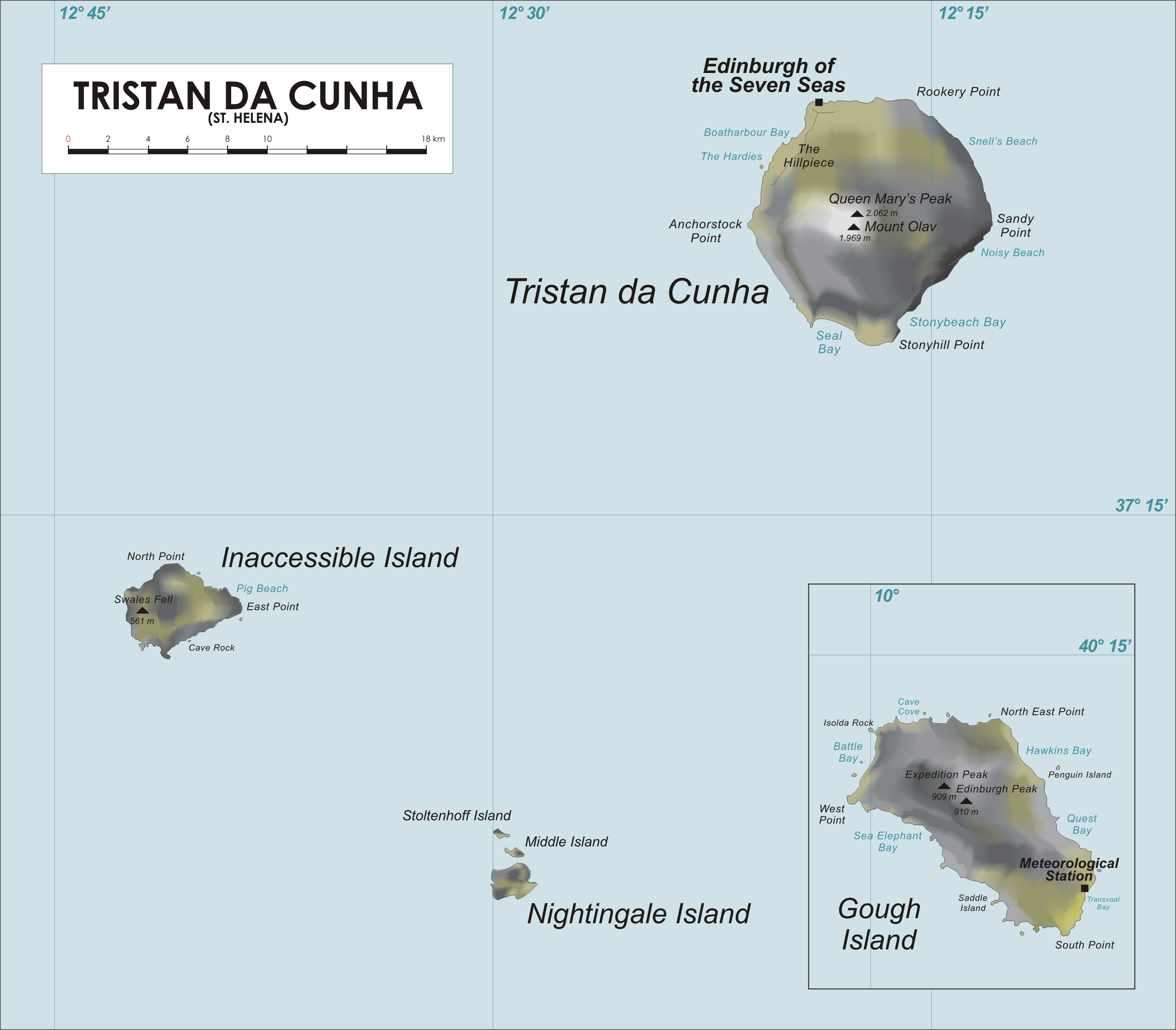
- Nightingale Island's location in relation to Tristan da Cunha

- Location within South Atlantic

Geography
- Location: South Atlantic Ocean
- Coordinates: 37.419444°S 12.477778°W
- Archipelago: Tristan da Cunha
- Area: 3.2 km^{2} (1.2 sq mi)
- Length: 1.5 km (0.93 mi)
- Width: 2.5 km (1.55 mi)
- Highest elevation: 370 m (1210 ft)
- Highest point: High Peak

Administration
- United Kingdom
- St Helena, Ascension and Tristan da Cunha

Nightingale Island is an active volcanic island in the South Atlantic Ocean, 3 square kilometres (1.2 sq mi) in area, part of the Tristan da Cunha group of islands. They are administered by the United Kingdom as part of the overseas territory of Saint Helena, Ascension and Tristan da Cunha.

Nightingale Island is part of the Nightingale Islands, which also includes islets Middle Island and Stoltenhoff Island. All three of these islands are uninhabited, but are regularly visited for scientific purposes and research. It is one of the only stops for birds in the Atlantic and millions of them visit it annually.

== Geography ==
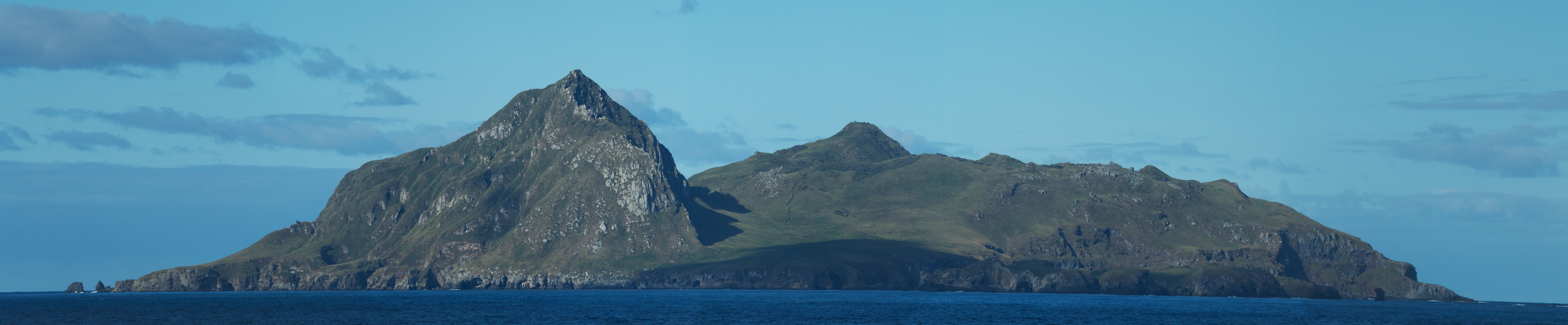
Nightingale Island

Nightingale has two peaks. One is High Ridge (sometimes mentioned as High Peak) at around 378 metres (1,240 ft) high while the other is around 300 metres (980 ft) high. The rest of the island is ringed by cliffs. However, these cliffs are not nearly as high as those surrounding Nightingale's neighbour Inaccessible Island, which is approximately 16 km away and has cliffs approximately 300 m high. Thus human access is much easier on Nightingale than on Inaccessible. The island is a volcano, composed of early and late stage ash deposits. Massive trachytic lava flows have been extruded in the past. Before 2004, the last eruption may have been over 39,000 years ago.

The two nearby islets are called Stoltenhoff (99 metres (325 ft)) and Middle (46 metres (151 ft)).

On the lower Western half of the island there are four water ponds, sometimes called the Molly Ponds, with the deepest being the Second, maximum depth of which is around 12–15 metres (39–49 ft).

Large amounts of kelp surround the island, which makes it difficult to anchor ships in bad weather.

== Climate ==
Nightingale Island has a cool temperate oceanic climate similar to the other Tristan da Cunha islands.

== History ==
The island, like its neighbours, is of volcanic origin and is estimated to be around 18 million years old, 15 million years older than Inaccessible Island.

Nightingale was possibly sighted along with Tristan da Cunha in 1506 by Tristão da Cunha, though he made no record of it.

It was originally named "Gebrooken Eyland" (Broken island) by the Dutch ship the Nachtglas under Jan Jacobszoon in January 1656, who found no safe anchorage; the first landing was not made until 1696 (most likely by Willem de Vlamingh in August of that year). French captain Pierre d'Etcheverry also visited the island in September 1767, first recording the two nearby islets now named Stoltenhoff and Middle. The island was later renamed after British captain Gamaliel Nightingale, who explored the island in 1760.

In the 17th and 18th centuries, the Dutch and French governments as well as the British East India Company considered taking possession of Nightingale (as well as Tristan and Inaccessible), but decided against it due to lack of landing space.

Nightingale has been said to contain pirate loot. Captain John Thomas, on an expedition to the South Atlantic, supposedly left a fortune of Spanish doubloons and pieces-of-eight in caves on Nightingale for safekeeping. However, no recovery of this treasure (if it is there) has ever been confirmed.

In 1811, the American pirate Jonathan Lambert laid claim to Tristan and its neighbouring islands. He wanted to call Inaccessible 'Pinsard Island', and Nightingale 'Lavel Island'. He was successful in his claim, but he died less than one year later.

In 1961, the 2,060-metre (6,760 ft) high shield volcano on Tristan da Cunha erupted and forced the inhabitants of Tristan da Cunha to evacuate to Nightingale. They eventually moved to the United Kingdom, returning to Tristan in 1963.

Wildlife conservation efforts are ongoing on Nightingale. The previous conservation workers' sheds were severely damaged during a storm produced by an extratropical cyclone in 2001 that reportedly included winds up to 120 mph. Repair is ongoing, but to continue carrying out the conservation work, all of the damaged shacks on the island need to be repaired. The United Kingdom established funding for a conservation effort on Nightingale for 2004–06.

=== 2004 eruption ===
A six-hour-long earthquake swarm occurred on Nightingale Island on 29 July 2004, followed by sightings of floating phonolitic pumice; the event came from a submarine flank of the island.

=== 2011 oil spill ===
Before daybreak on 16 March 2011, the Maltese-registered MS Oliva cargo carrier ran aground at Spinners Point on the island's northwestern shore. The resulting oil spill, which spread around the island, was expected to have a significant impact on the seabird colonies of Nightingale and Middle Island. The ship contained 1,500 metric tons of crude oil and a cargo of 60,000 metric tons of soya beans. As many as 20,000 penguins were threatened, and there was a risk that rats from the ship could make it ashore to eventually prey on the chicks and eggs of native seabirds. Nightingale Island has no fresh water, so the penguins were transported to Tristan da Cunha for cleaning. The Greek captain and his 21 Filipino crew stayed in Edinburgh of the Seven Seas and assisted the islanders in their work. One of the lifeboats from MS Oliva subsequently washed ashore in February 2013 near the Murray Mouth, South Australia.

== Flora and fauna ==
=== Fauna ===
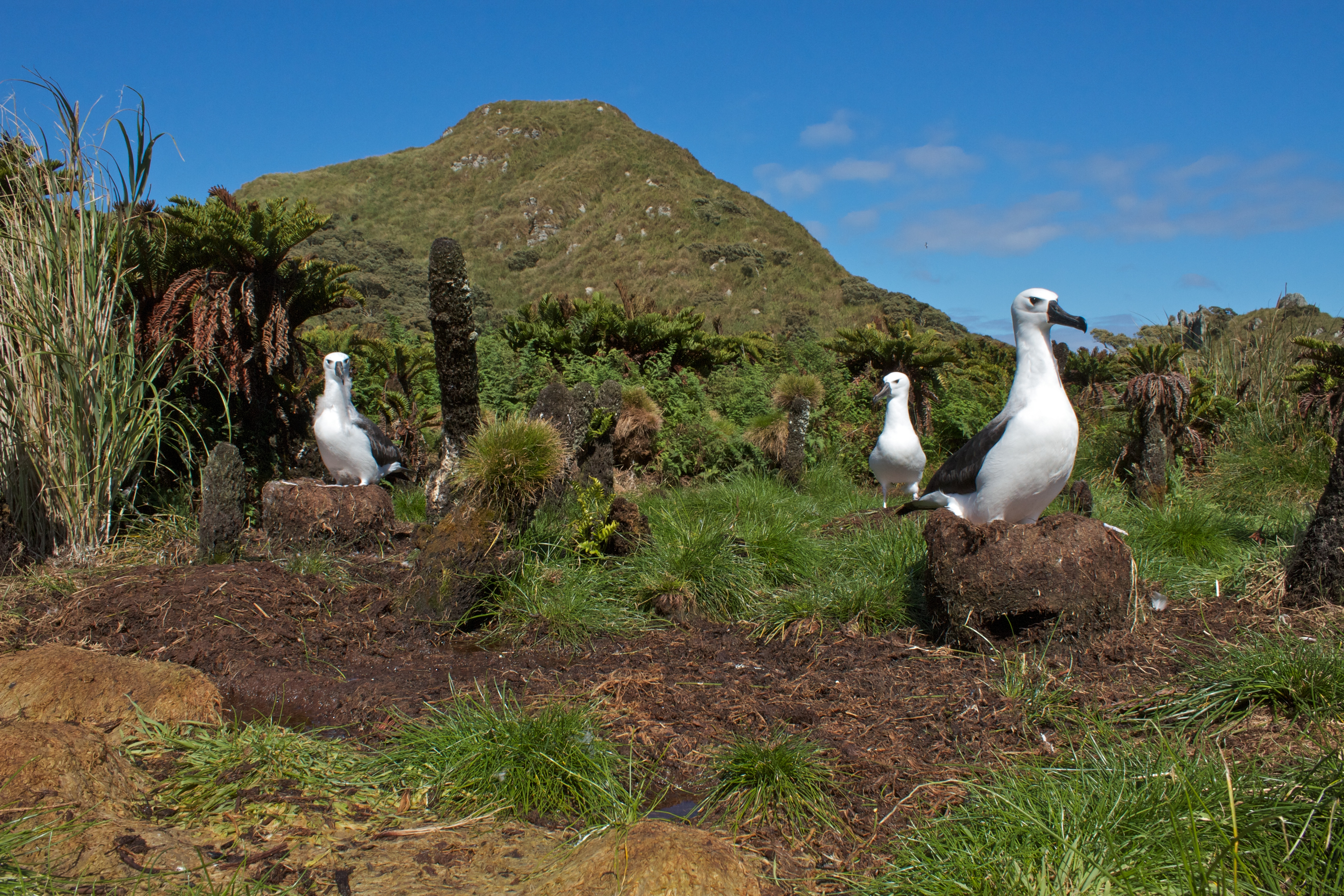
Albatrosses nesting in fernbrush on Nightingale Island

Nightingale Island is known as a breeding ground for various types of seabirds; over a million birds are estimated to breed on the island, with great shearwaters being among the most abundant, their total population estimated to be around 2.5 million, half of their presence in the archipelago. The number of birds which come to the island for nesting has been said to be from 4 million to the highest of around 6 million.

Other notable bird species occupying the island include broad-billed prion, white-faced storm petrel and soft-plumaged petrel. Endangered species like Atlantic yellow-nosed albatross (at 3000—4000 pairs) and sooty albatross (200 pairs) are also present.

There are four wetland areas on the island which each contain hundreds of Atlantic yellow-nosed albatrosses. As with Inaccessible Island, Nightingale also has a breeding colony of northern rockhopper penguins, now an endangered species, with a fraction of the 1950s population remaining. Many of the penguin colonies are hidden behind grass, but their number of pairs was estimated to be 22,000–28,000 pairs on Nightingale, with additional 80,000–85,000 pairs at Middle (Alex) Island. The island is part of the Nightingale Islands group Important Bird Area (IBA), identified as such by BirdLife International as a breeding site for seabirds and endemic landbirds.

=== Flora ===
There are a few species of vegetation present on the island:

- Tussock grassland, specifically Spartina arundinacea and other species (Hypolepis rugosula, Histiopteris incisa, Scirpus bicolor), which covers most of the island. Space between tussock bases is occupied by great shearwaters nests. Most of the disturbed open areas were taken over by newly introduced species like Holcus lanatu and Poa annua.
- Fern bush (Phylica arborea), growing in the area near the four Molly Ponds.
- Floating mats of grass-like Scirpus sulcatus, found on the Ponds themselves, leaving little open water left.

In 1992 it was estimated that out of 43 species, only 7 were alien, with 16 endemic and 20 native ones.

== Tourism ==
The Gough Islands are strict nature reserves with no tourism permitted. However, tourists are permitted to go to Nightingale.

Many tourists to Tristan da Cunha visit Nightingale Island for the wildlife. Non-Tristanians can travel to Nightingale only with a guide from Tristan. Part of the money they pay the guide goes toward paying for the conservation work being done on the island. Once a year, filmmakers and journalists are permitted to work on the island (for a fee), but they are not allowed to interfere with the private lives of the Tristanian islanders. Also, Tristan natives visit Nightingale on holiday.

== Economy ==
Up to 15,000 Great Shearwater eggs, several thousand adults and around 50,000 chicks are harvested every year from Nightingale by Tristan Islanders, which is not considered a threat to the species' numerous population. Penguin eggs are also harvested, although in recent years the numbers have decreased, and only one of two laid eggs is taken from each nest to not harm the decreasing population further.

Fishing companies fish off the coast of Nightingale, just as they do with Inaccessible.

Nightingale also has guano deposits.

Several silver and cupro-nickel collector coins from Nightingale Island were issued in denominations of one crown in 2005 and 2006. A complete series of coins in values from ½ penny to £2 and including a one crown coin were issued in 2011 by Tristan da Cunha on behalf of Nightingale Island.

- Subantarctic fur seal – cupro-nickel – 1 crown denomination
- Mahi-mahi – bi-metallic – 25 pence
- Oarfish – brass – 20 pence
- Blue shark – cupro-nickel – 10 pence
- Octopus – cupro-nickel – 5 pence
- Bluefin tuna – copper – 2 pence
- Swordfish – copper – 1 penny
- Flyingfish – copper – ½ penny

== In popular culture ==
Edgar Allan Poe's The Narrative of Arthur Gordon Pym of Nantucket alluded to Nightingale Island, Inaccessible Island, and Tristan da Cunha.
