= Inaccessible Island =

Island in Tristan da Cunha archipelago

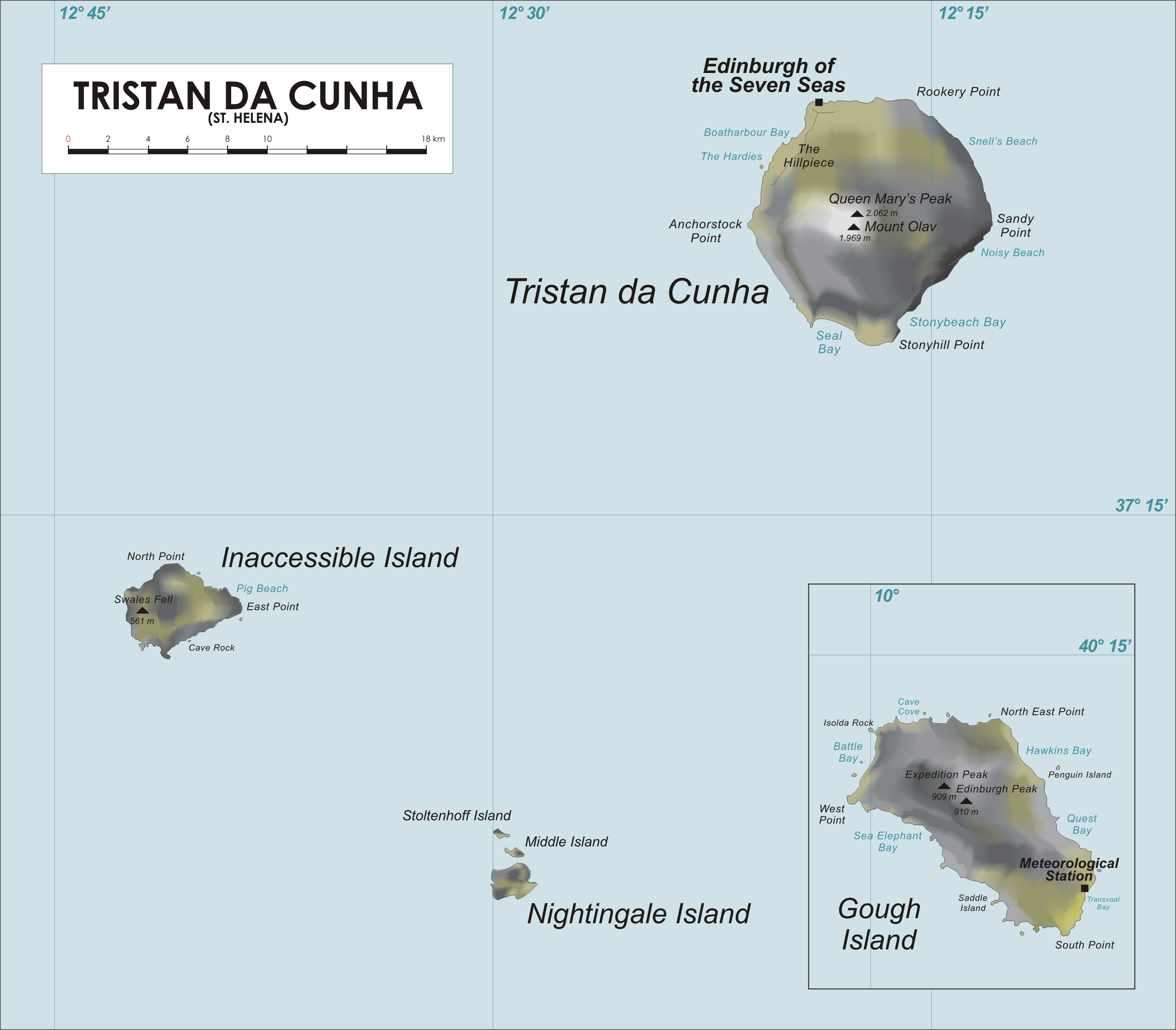
- Inaccessible Island's location in relation to Tristan da Cunha

- Location within South Atlantic

Geography
- Location: South Atlantic Ocean
- Coordinates: 37.30°S 12.68°W
- Archipelago: Tristan da Cunha
- Area: 12.65 km^{2} (4.88 sq mi)

Administration
- United Kingdom
- St Helena, Ascension and Tristan da Cunha
- IUCN category Ia (strict nature reserve)

UNESCO World Heritage Site
- Type: Natural
- Criteria: vii, x
- Designated: 1995 (41st session)
- Reference no.: 740

Ramsar Wetland
- Designated: 20 November 2008
- Reference no.: 1869

Inaccessible Island is a volcanic island located in the South Atlantic Ocean, 31 km (19 mi) south-west of Tristan da Cunha. Its highest point, Swale's Fell, reaches 581 m (1,906 ft), and the island is 12.65 km^{2} (4.88 sq mi) in area. The volcano was last active approximately one million years ago and is now extinct.

Inaccessible Island is a part of the archipelago of Tristan da Cunha, which is a part of the overseas territory of the United Kingdom known as Saint Helena, Ascension and Tristan da Cunha. Tristan da Cunha itself is accessible only by sea via a six-day voyage from Cape Town, South Africa. The harbour on Inaccessible Island allows access for only a few days of the year. Access to Inaccessible Island must be granted by the local government office.

== Geography ==
Southern coast of Inaccessible Island seen in 2024, with Tristan da Cunha visible on the right.

The island is approximately 40 kilometres (22 nmi; 25 mi) to the southwest of the main island of the Tristan da Cunha archipelago. Mostly desolate and inhospitable, the island has a few small, rocky beaches that host penguins and subantarctic fur seals. Generations of sailors were wary of the difficult landing and inhospitable terrain. Inaccessible Island has been without permanent inhabitants since 1873.

Along with Gough Island, Inaccessible Island is a protected wildlife reserve. Together they form the UNESCO World Heritage Site of Gough and Inaccessible Islands. Inaccessible Island is home of the endemic Inaccessible Island rail, the world's smallest extant flightless bird.

== History ==
Inaccessible Island was discovered in January 1656 during a voyage by the Nachtglas ("the night glass"), a Dutch ship under the command of Jan Jakobszoon. It was discovered 146 years after Tristan da Cunha was first sighted by Portuguese sailors. Jakobszoon originally named it "Nachtglas" island.

There are two explanations for the name "Inaccessible" Island. One is that the Dutch crew who landed were not able to reach its interior. The other claims that French captain d'Etcheverry renamed the island in 1778 after not being able to land.

In 1803, US sailors led by Amasa Delano made landfall on the island during a voyage to the Cape of Good Hope.

The brothers Gustav and Frederick Stoltenhoff arrived on Inaccessible from Germany in 1871. They lived there for two years to make a living sealing and selling their wares to passing traders, although such trade was minimal. Due to the scarcity of food, they were "overjoyed" to be rescued in 1873 during HMS Challenger's visit to examine the flora and fauna there. The South African author Eric Rosenthal chronicled the Stoltenhoffs' adventure in 1952. The nearby Stoltenhoff Island is named for the brothers.

In 1922, the Shackleton–Rowett Expedition's ship, the Quest, stopped by Inaccessible briefly, and on-board naturalist Hubert Wilkins discovered a bird later named the Wilkins finch (Nesospiza wilkinsi). In 1938, the Norwegian Scientific Expedition to Tristan da Cunha spent three weeks on the island, during which time they managed to gain access to the plateau and extensively catalogued plants, birds, and rocks. Another attempt at mapping the island was made during the Royal Society's expedition of 1962 to Tristan da Cunha, which took scientists to Inaccessible Island. Like many other explorers before them, the scientists were not able to reach the interior of the island.

Inaccessible Island was declared a nature reserve under the Tristan da Cunha Conservation Ordinance of 1976. Tristan islanders, however, were still permitted to harvest seabirds from the island. In a 1982 expedition (16 October 1982 – 10 February 1983), students and faculty of Denstone College in England made detailed maps of the island, studied its flora, fauna, and geology, and carried out a bird ringing programme on more than 3,000 birds.

In 1997, Inaccessible Island's territorial waters out to 22 km (14 mi) were declared a nature reserve under the Tristan da Cunha Conservation Ordinance of 1976. Currently, only guides from Tristan are allowed to take visiting cruise ships to Inaccessible; most trips to the island are now made at the request of expatriates. In 2004 Inaccessible Island was added to the UNESCO World Heritage Site of Gough Island to create a new site of Gough and Inaccessible Islands.

=== Shipwrecks ===
At least three confirmed shipwrecks have occurred off the coast of the island. The first was Blenden Hall, a British ship which set sail in 1821 with 54 passengers and crew aboard, her destination Bombay. Captain Alexander Grieg intended to sail past Saint Helena, but adverse currents carried her to Tristan da Cunha. She got caught in seaweed, and on 22 July, drifted aground on Inaccessible Island. All but two of those aboard survived the shipwreck. They spent the next four months subsisting on wild celery, seals, penguins, and albatross. They managed to build a boat some months later. The first attempt to sail to Tristan failed, resulting in the loss of six people; the second attempt alerted the Tristanians to their plight. The remainder were then brought to Tristan, where the brig Nerina arrived about two months later and took most to Cape Town, South Africa.

The other two shipwrecks are the wreck of Shakespeare at Pig Beach in 1883, and Helenslea at North Point in 1897.

== Flora and fauna ==
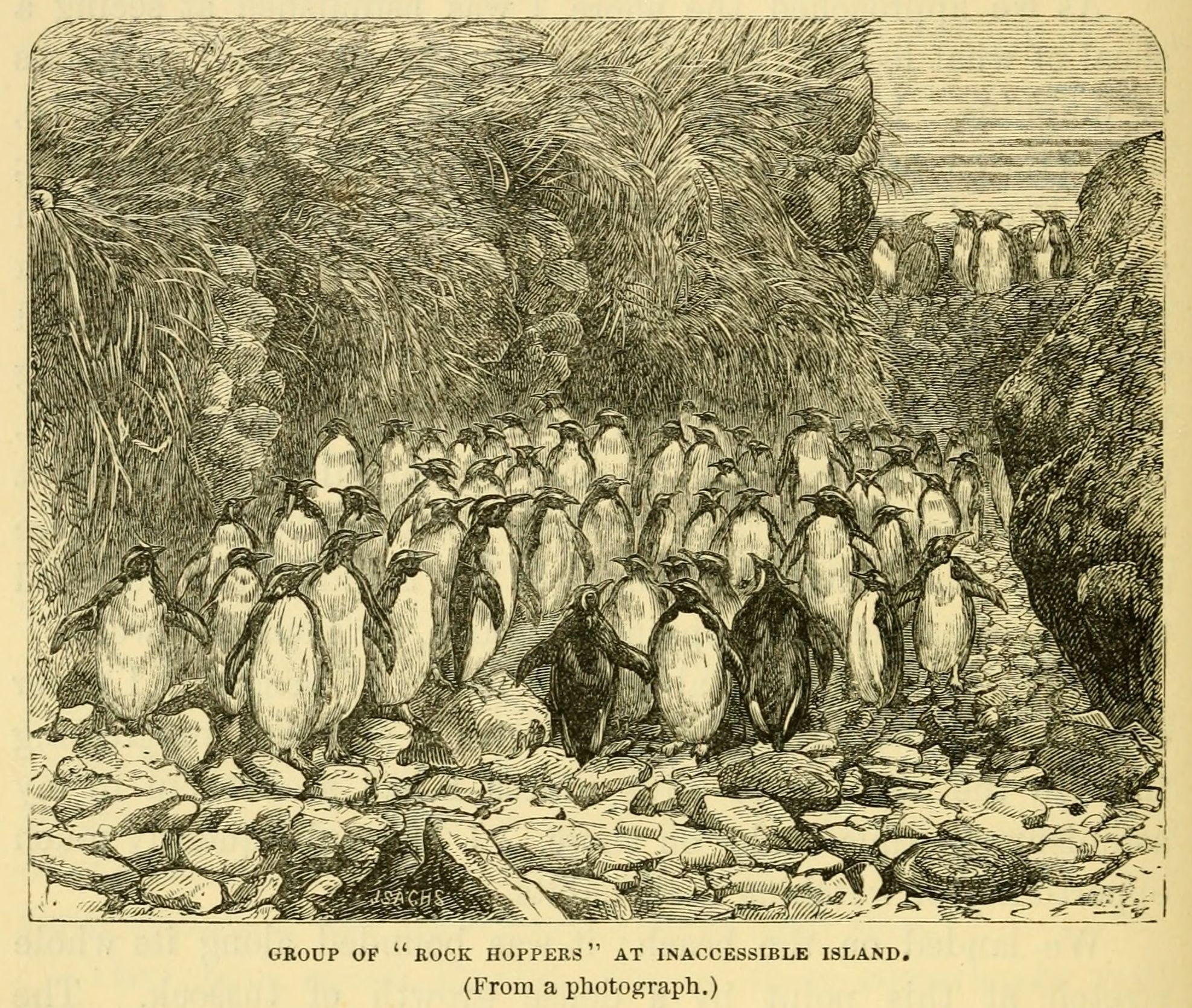
Northern rockhopper penguins, from an engraving after a photograph, published in a book by the naturalist aboard HMS Challenger

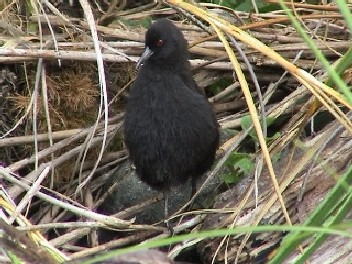
Inaccessible rail

When Corporal William Glass and his family became the first settlers at Tristan da Cunha in 1816, goats and pigs were brought to Inaccessible Island to serve as a source of food. Cattle, sheep, and dogs were introduced to the island during its history. Domestic animals helped to keep the Stoltenhoff brothers alive during their expedition. All remaining domestic animals were removed during the 1950s.

No land mammals, reptiles, amphibians, or butterflies have been found at Inaccessible. The island has 64 native plant species, including 20 types of flowering plants and 17 species of ferns. 48 invertebrate species exist on the island, 10 of which were introduced. Subantarctic fur seals and southern elephant seals have been seen at the island in increasing numbers, and cetaceans live in the surrounding waters: most notably, southern right whales and a resident population of dusky dolphins.

Several plant pathogens have been introduced to the island. These are scale insects and an associated sooty mold fungus. This has killed some of the Phylica trees and reduced the amount of fruit they produce. A likely consequence is the observed serious decline in numbers of Inaccessible Island finch between 2014 and 2020.

=== Birds ===
Inaccessible is the exclusive habitat of the Inaccessible Island rail, the world's smallest living flightless bird. In 1955, researchers determined that the Inaccessible Island rail was the descendant of ancestors that had flown to the island and over time evolved to become flightless. The island has been identified as an Important Bird Area (IBA) by BirdLife International as a breeding site for seabirds and its endemic landbirds. Birds for which the IBA is significant include northern rockhopper penguins (up to 27,000 breeding pairs), Tristan albatrosses (2–3 pairs), sooty albatrosses (200 pairs), Atlantic yellow-nosed albatrosses (1,100 pairs), broad-billed prions (up to 500,000 pairs), soft-plumaged petrels (up to 50,000 pairs), spectacled petrels, great shearwaters (up to 2 million pairs), little shearwaters (up to 50,000 pairs), white-faced storm petrels (up to 50,000 pairs), white-bellied storm petrels (up to 50,000 pairs), Antarctic terns, Inaccessible rails (up to 5,000 pairs), Tristan thrushes (1,500-7,000 individuals across the Tristan da Cunha archipelago), and Inaccessible Island finches (around 24,000 individuals).

== In popular culture ==
- Edgar Allan Poe's The Narrative of Arthur Gordon Pym of Nantucket alluded to Nightingale Island, Inaccessible Island, and Tristan da Cunha.
- In Patrick O'Brian's The Thirteen-Gun Salute (1989), pp. 120–29, Captain Aubrey's ship Diane, in a dead calm, is carried toward Inaccessible Island by the onshore current. One sailor recounts the wreck of a whaling ship that he witnessed when it was lost with all hands in similar conditions. Only a fortunate breeze saves Aubrey's ship. The episode is depicted in the cover painting of the book showing the towering cliffs plunging directly into the sea.
- "Sea Lion", the pseudonym of "a serving naval officer" (Geoffrey Martin Bennett), wrote The Phantom Fleet (1946), predicated on the supposition that Inaccessible Island contained a natural harbour, the entrance to which was concealed from the sea. The antagonists were assembling a fleet of obsolescent warships in this harbour, with the intention of striking a coup de main leading to world domination, a scheme foiled by the derring-do of a naval officer and the guns of the Royal Navy.
- Eric Newby passed within sight of Inaccessible Island on his 1938–1939 voyage from Ireland to Australia aboard Moshulu, as chronicled in his books The Last Grain Race and Learning the Ropes. It was the only land that the crew saw on the voyage until reaching Australia, and was therefore a cause for some excitement.

== See also ==
- List of mountains and hills of Saint Helena, Ascension and Tristan da Cunha
