= Middle Island, Tristan da Cunha =

Island in Tristan da Cunha archipelago

Coordinates: 37°24′40″S 12°28′46″W

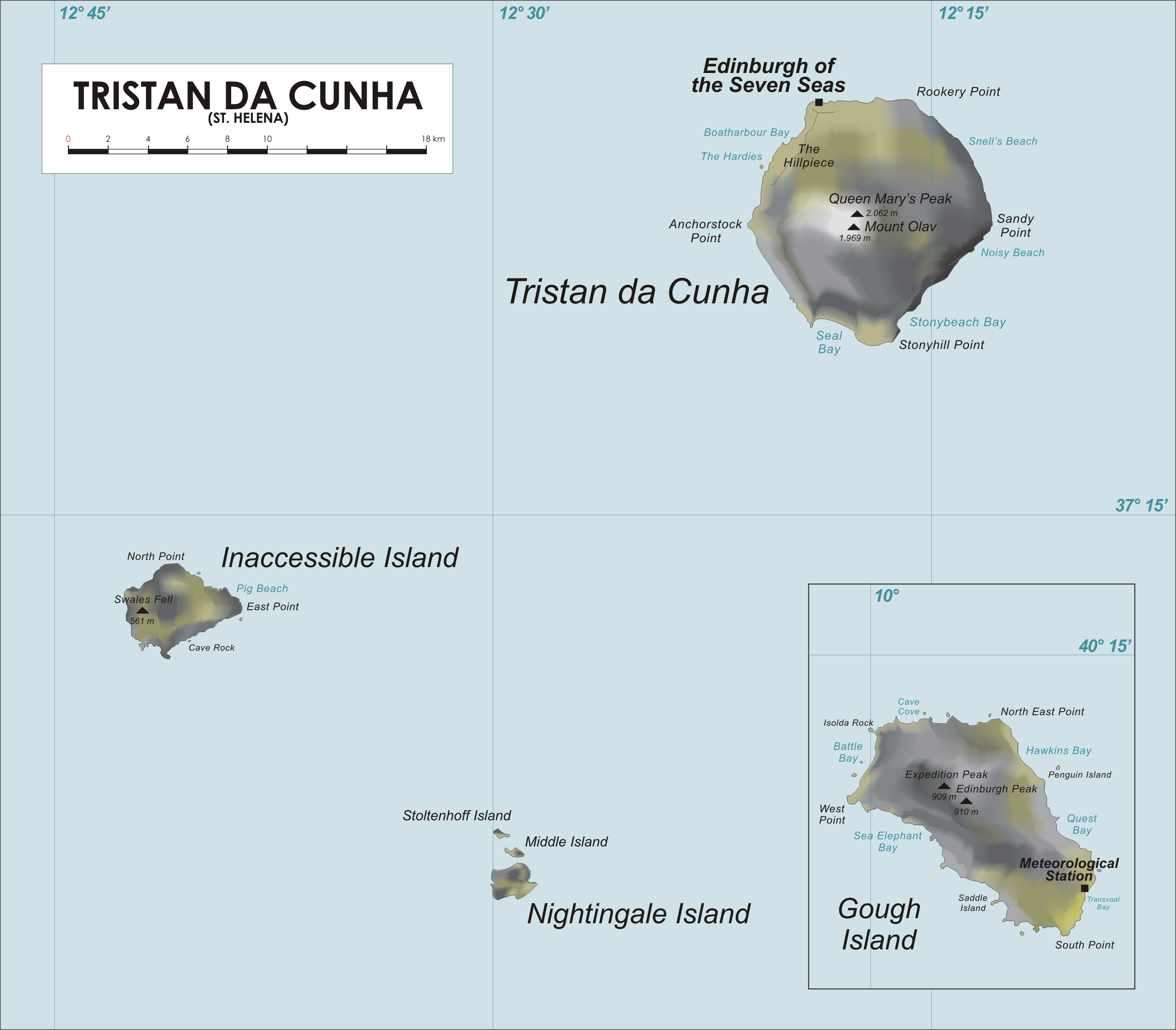
Map of Tristan da Cunha, showing Middle Island

Location of Middle Island in the Atlantic Ocean

Middle Island is a small, uninhabited island in the South Atlantic Ocean, part of the Nightingale Islands. It is governed as part of Tristan da Cunha, an archipelago that is part of the British overseas territory of Saint Helena, Ascension and Tristan da Cunha. The island is part of the Nightingale Islands group Important Bird Area (IBA), identified as such by BirdLife International as a breeding site for seabirds and endemic landbirds. It is also known as Alex Island.
