= Stoltenhoff Island =

Island in Tristan da Cunha archipelago

Coordinates: 37°24′8″S 12°29′21″W

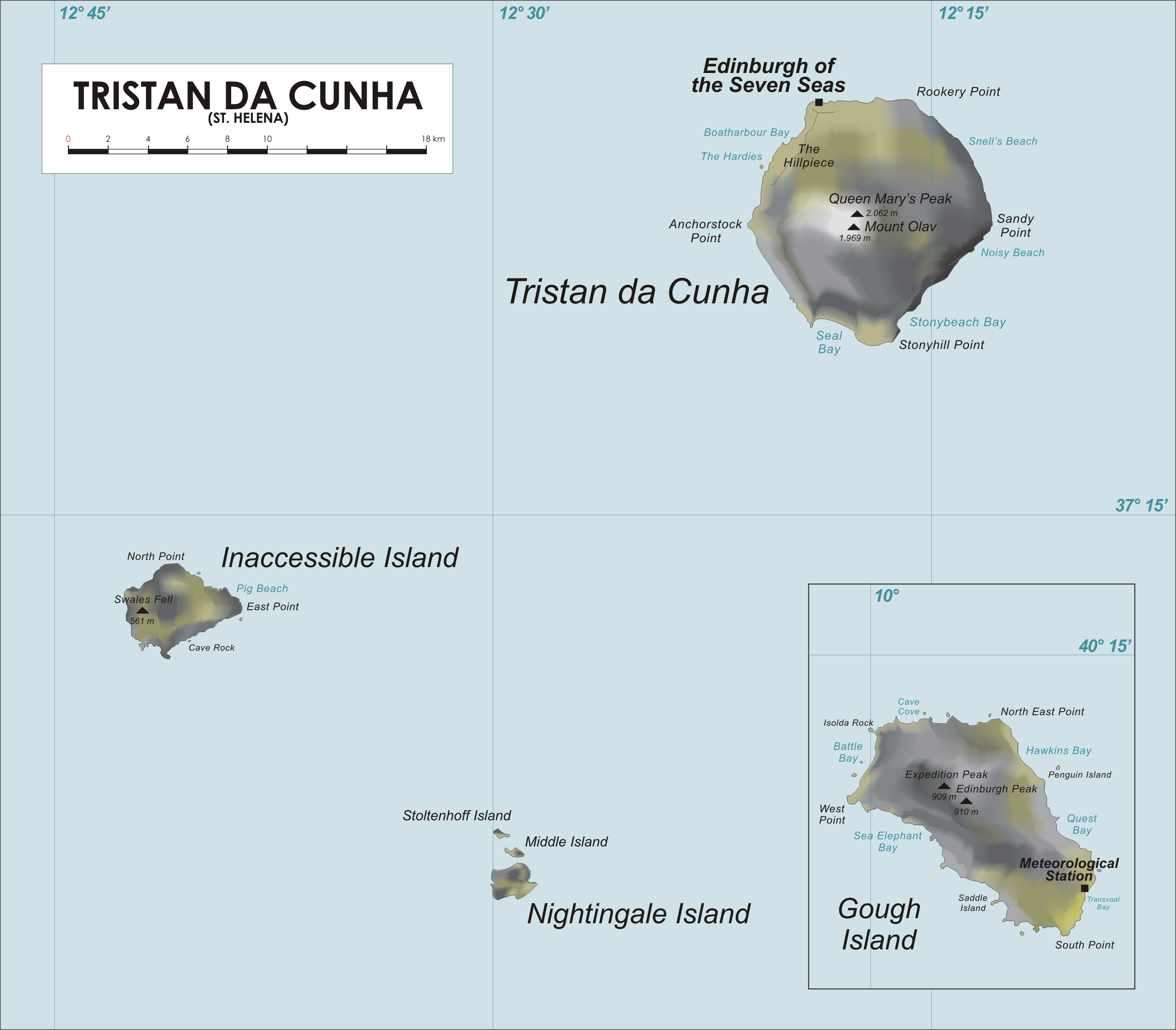
Map of Tristan da Cunha, showing Stoltenhoff Island

Location of Stoltenhoff Island in the Atlantic Ocean

Stoltenhoff Island is a small uninhabited island in the South Atlantic Ocean, part of the Nightingale Islands. It is the smallest of the Nightingale Islands, and is to the northwest of Nightingale Island itself. They are governed as part of Tristan da Cunha, an archipelago and part of the British overseas territory of Saint Helena, Ascension and Tristan da Cunha. The island is part of the Nightingale Islands group Important Bird Area (IBA), identified as such by BirdLife International as a breeding site for seabirds and endemic landbirds.

The island is named after the two German brothers, Gustav and Friedrich Stoltenhoff, who tried to settle on nearby Inaccessible Island. Their attempt was abandoned after two difficult years.

Coins of Stoltenhoff Island is a legal tender coinage that caused controversy after being struck at Commonwealth Mint in the UK and declared legal tender by the Government of Tristan da Cunha.
