= Diocese of St Helena =

Anglican see covering Saint and Ascension Islands in the South Atlantic

Diocese of Saint Helena
- Arms of the Diocese of St Helena

Location
- Territory: Saint Helena and Ascension Island
- Ecclesiastical province: Southern Africa
- Metropolitan: Thabo Makgoba

Statistics
- Parishes: 4
- Churches: 12
- Congregations: 13
- Members: 3,000 (60% of St. Helena, 70% of Ascension Island)

Information
- Denomination: Anglican
- Rite: Anglican
- Established: 1859
- Cathedral: St Paul's Cathedral

Current leadership
- Bishop: Dale Bowers

The Diocese of Saint Helena is an Anglican diocese within the Anglican Church of Southern Africa. It covers the islands of Saint Helena and Ascension in the Atlantic Ocean and was created in 1859. St Paul's Cathedral is on Saint Helena.

== History ==
In 1502, an uninhabited island was discovered by the Portuguese admiral, João da Nova. The traditional date of this discovery was long thought to be 21 May, but the results of an investigation into the timing of the discovery published in 2015 concluded this date is probably wrong and that 3 May seems historically more valid. By tradition, Da Nova anchored in the lee of the island opposite a deep valley. A timber chapel was built in the valley which later became the site of Jamestown. The island was named Santa Helena, later anglicised as St Helena. Portugal, Spain, the Dutch Republic and England all took an interest in the island as a place to refresh ships and sailors on long voyages.

The English Commonwealth under Oliver Cromwell granted a new charter to the East India Company in 1657, which gave the company the right to fortify and colonise any of its establishments. Because of the strategic importance of St Helena as a fortress and staging post on the way home from India, the Company claimed the Island on 5 May 1659. The building of the fort was commenced immediately. A little town sprang up in the valley with the chapel and was subsequently named Jamestown, after King James II.

In 1671, the East India Company sent the first of a long sequence of Church of England chaplains. The early, modest little church was replaced by a slightly bigger one in 1674, but was only later named St. James church. Another church ("the Country Church") was built shortly afterwards near the present St. Paul's church.

By 1774 the first parish church in Jamestown showed signs of decay, and so finally a new building was erected. St. James' is the oldest surviving Anglican church south of the Equator.

On 7 March 1849 the first bishop of Cape Town, Robert Gray, arrived to conduct the confirmations on the island. Bishop Gray made a further two visits in 1852 and 1857. Ten years later, in 1859, the Diocese of St. Helena was established by Queen's Order in Council, and included the islands of Ascension and Tristan da Cunha. Furthermore, until 1869 the diocese also included the British residents of Rio de Janeiro and other towns on the eastern seaboard of South America as well as the Falklands. The first bishop, Piers Calverley Claughton, was consecrated in Westminster Abbey and arrived later the same year. St Paul's Cathedral, built 1850–51, became the cathedral in 1859.

Following the Zulu War, Chief Dinizulu, son of Cetshwayo kaMpande, and his family were exiled to the island in 1890 for nine years. Dinizulu became a convert to Christianity and was baptised and confirmed by the bishop.

In the 1960s, ecclesiastical jurisdiction Tristan da Cunha was transferred to the Diocese of Cape Town. The diocese now consists solely of Saint Helena and Ascension Island.

The diocese is the fourth oldest diocese in the Anglican Church of Southern Africa.

== Saint Helena ==
There are three parishes on Saint Helena with 12 churches:

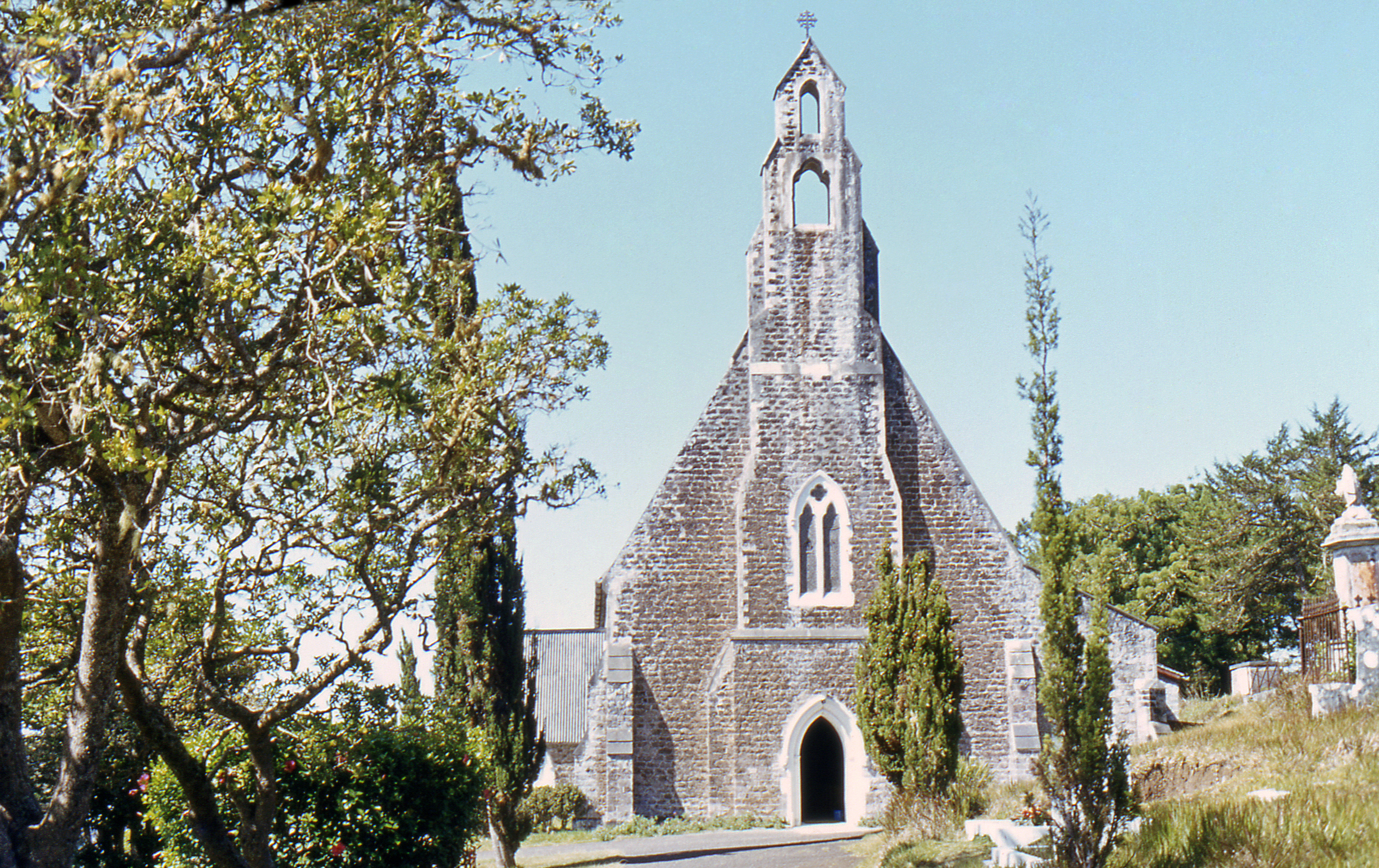
Saint Paul's Cathedral, Saint Helena

The Cathedral Parish of St Paul's which consists of St Paul's Cathedral, and four daughter churches:

- St Andrew's, Half Tree Hollow
- St Helena of the Cross, Blue Hill
- St Martin's in the Hills, Thompson's Hill
- St Peter's, Sandy Bay

The Parish of St James. St James' Church in Jamestown is the oldest Anglican church in the southern hemisphere, the present building was put up in 1774. There are three daughter churches:

- St John's, Upper Jamestown
- St Mary's, the Briars
- St Michael's, Rupert's Valley

The Parish of St Matthew: St Matthew in Hutt's Gate with one daughter church,

- St Mark's, Longwood
- a congregation at Levelwood but no church building

== Ascension Island ==
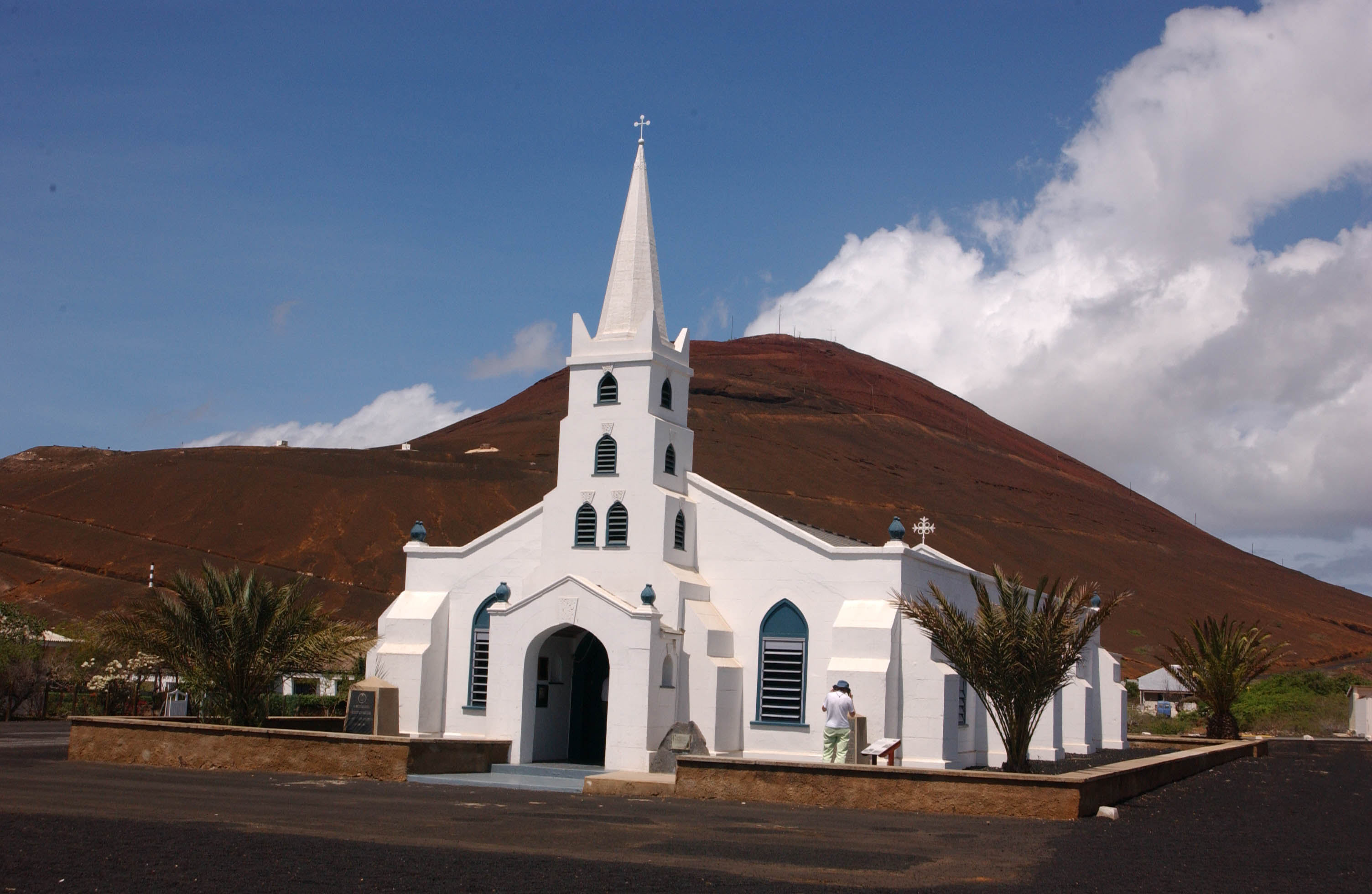
St. Mary's Church

There is one parish on Ascension Island, with one church – St Mary's, which is in Georgetown.

The cornerstone of St. Mary's church was laid by Mrs. Dwyer, wife of the Commandant, on 6 September 1843. The following year, the first Royal Navy Chaplain arrived, the Rev. George Bellamy. The main body of the church was completed in 1846, making it the second oldest existing Anglican church in the Diocese, second only to St. James church on St. Helena.

Bishop Piers Calverley Claughton arrived on HMS Buffalo in 1861 to consecrate the church and conduct a confirmation service. The old pulpit and reading desk were removed in 1870, during the time of Rev. J.T. Westroff, and replaced with a lectern. The pews were also replaced with open seats and an altar, with rails installed. Two years later, the Rev. George C. Waller added a seat in the chancel. Between 1879 and 1880, restoration work was undertaken under the auspices of Captain A.G. Roe. A chancel was also added. Over the next two decades, a new organ was installed, the chancel was paved with tessellated pavement, the present brass lectern replaced the old one, a new stained glass East window was installed, and an oak litany desk was donated. On Easter Day in 1900 a stone font was presented by the congregation and placed at the entrance to the church.

Royal Navy chaplains presiding at the church came to an end in 1905 when the garrison was reduced to 120. The bishops paid twice yearly visits, and Sunday worship was led by lay people licensed by the bishop. The Royal Naval garrison was finally withdrawn in 1922. Ascension Island became a dependency of the Colony of St Helena, a status it would maintain until 2009. From 1966 onwards, with Rev. John Crawford appointed as the first vicar of St Mary's, the bishops of St Helena appointed vicars to take care of the parish. In 1968, Crawford raised £3,000 (equivalent to £57,000 in 2023) for the reconstruction of the church, which still stands at Georgetown. He held his last service on Ascension Day of 1969 before returning to Halifax, West Yorkshire, where he died on 28 December 1972, aged 54.

== List of bishops of Saint Helena ==
- Piers Calverley Claughton 1859–1862
- Thomas Earle Welby 1862–1899
- John Garraway Holmes 1899–1905
- William Arthur Holbech 1905–1930
- Charles Christopher Watts 1930–1935
- Charles Arthur William Aylen 1935–1940
- Gilbert Price Lloyd Turner 1940–1960
- Harold Beardmore 1960–1968
- Edmund Michael Hubert Capper 1968–1973
- George Kenneth Giggall 1973–1978
- Edward Alexander Cannan 1978–1985
- James Nathaniel Johnson 1986–1991
- John Harry Gerald Ruston 1991–1999
- John William Salt 1999–2011
- Richard David Fenwick 2011–2018
- Dale Bowers 2018–

== Coat of arms ==
The diocesan arms are described as follows: Azure, in base on water barry wavy proper therein fishes naiant Or, an ancient galley manned, sail furled of the last, in chief a crescent Argent and a sun in splendour also of the second. . These arms were granted by the College of Arms under Letters Patent dated 24 November 1949.
