= James Johnson (bishop of St Helena) =

Bishop of St Helena (1932–2022)

James Nathaniel Johnson (28 April 1932 – 1 December 2022) was Bishop of St Helena from 1986 to 1991.

Johnson was born in 1932.

He trained for ordination at Wells Theological College and was ordained deacon in 1964 and priest in 1965. He served his title at Lawrence Weston (1964–66), after which he was successively Priest-in-Charge of St Paul's Cathedral, St Helena (1966–69) and then Vicar (1969–71) as well as Domestic Chaplain to the Bishop of St Helena (1967–71). He was then in England again as USPG Area Secretary for Exeter and Truro dioceses (1972–74), Rector of Combe Martin (1974–80) and Vicar of Thorpe Bay (1980–85) until being appointed the first island-born Bishop of St Helena and enthroned on 26 January 1986. He resigned as Bishop in 1991, returning to England once more where he was Assistant Bishop in Peterborough diocese (1991–92), Rector of Byfield with Boddington and Aston le Walls (1991–92), Vicar of Hockley (1992–97); Assistant Bishop in Chelmsford diocese (1992–97), and Canon of Chelmsford Cathedral (1994–97). He retired in 1997.

He settled in Bodicote, Oxfordshire and from 2004 served as an honorary assistant bishop in Oxford Diocese.

He died in 2022 aged 90.

Anglican Communion titles
| Preceded by Edward Alexander Cannan | Bishop of St Helena; 1986–1991 | Succeeded by John Harry Gerald Ruston |
