= Saint John's Church, Jamestown =

Church in the British territory of Saint Helena

Coordinates: 15.9335°S 5.7119°W

Saint John's Church is a church on the island of Saint Helena and is part of the Diocese of St Helena. It is situated in the capital Jamestown, in the Upper part of town.

The church was built in 1862 and is similar in design to Saint Helena's Saint Paul's Cathedral, which was built in the 1850s. It is designated as a Grade I listed building, and is one of many listed buildings (a designation for buildings of historic or architectural merit) in Jamestown.

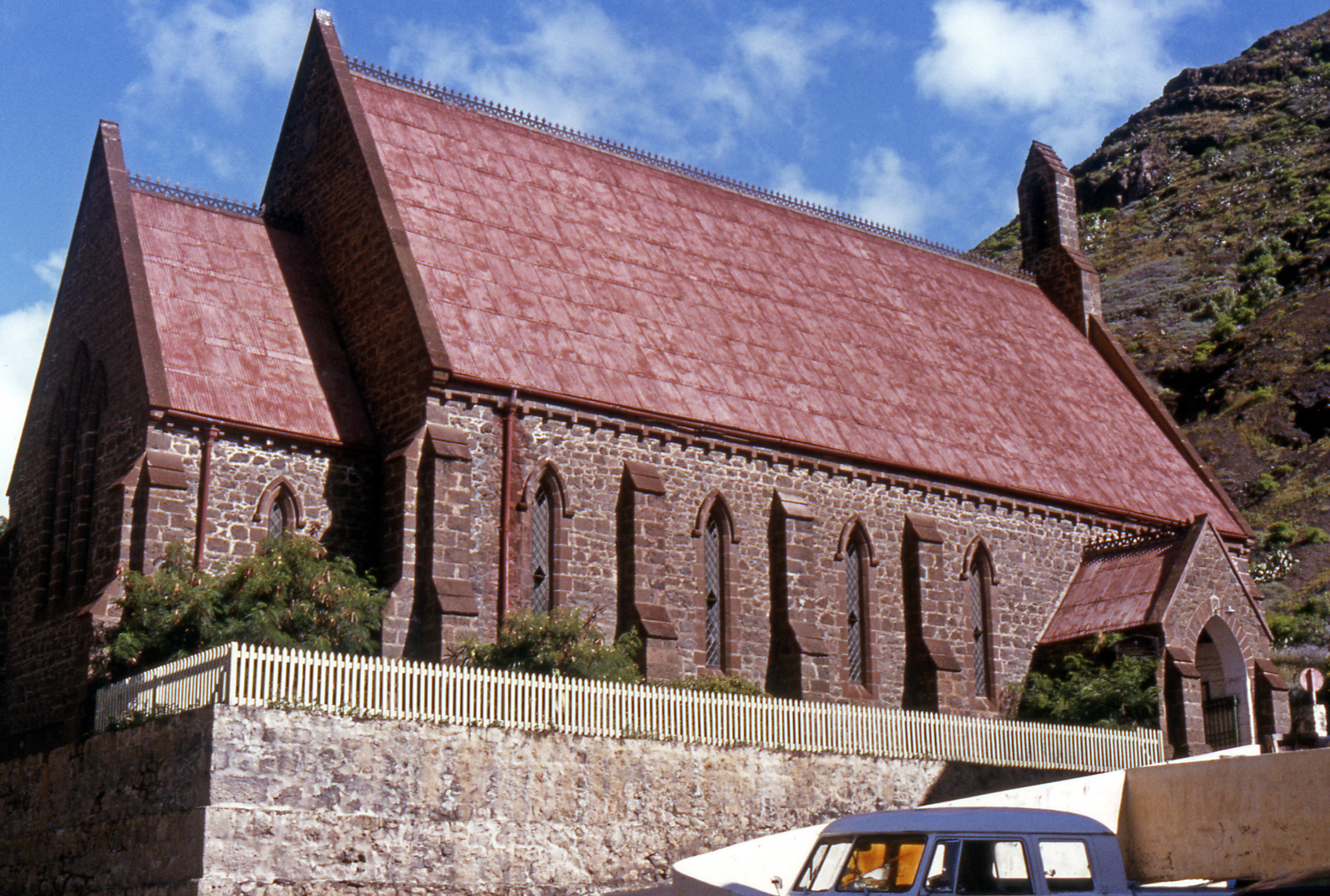
Anglican Church of Saint John's.

== Parish ==
The church falls within the parish of St James (one of three parishes on the island), which consists of the historic Saint James' Church (situated in the lower part of town) and three daughter churches:

- Saint John's
- Saint Mary's, the Briars
- Saint Michael's, Rupert's Valley

== See also ==
- Saint Matthew, Hutt's Gate - another church built in 1862 on the island
