= Saint Matthew, Hutt's Gate =

Church in the British territory of Saint Helena

Coordinates: 15.9619°S 5.6984°W

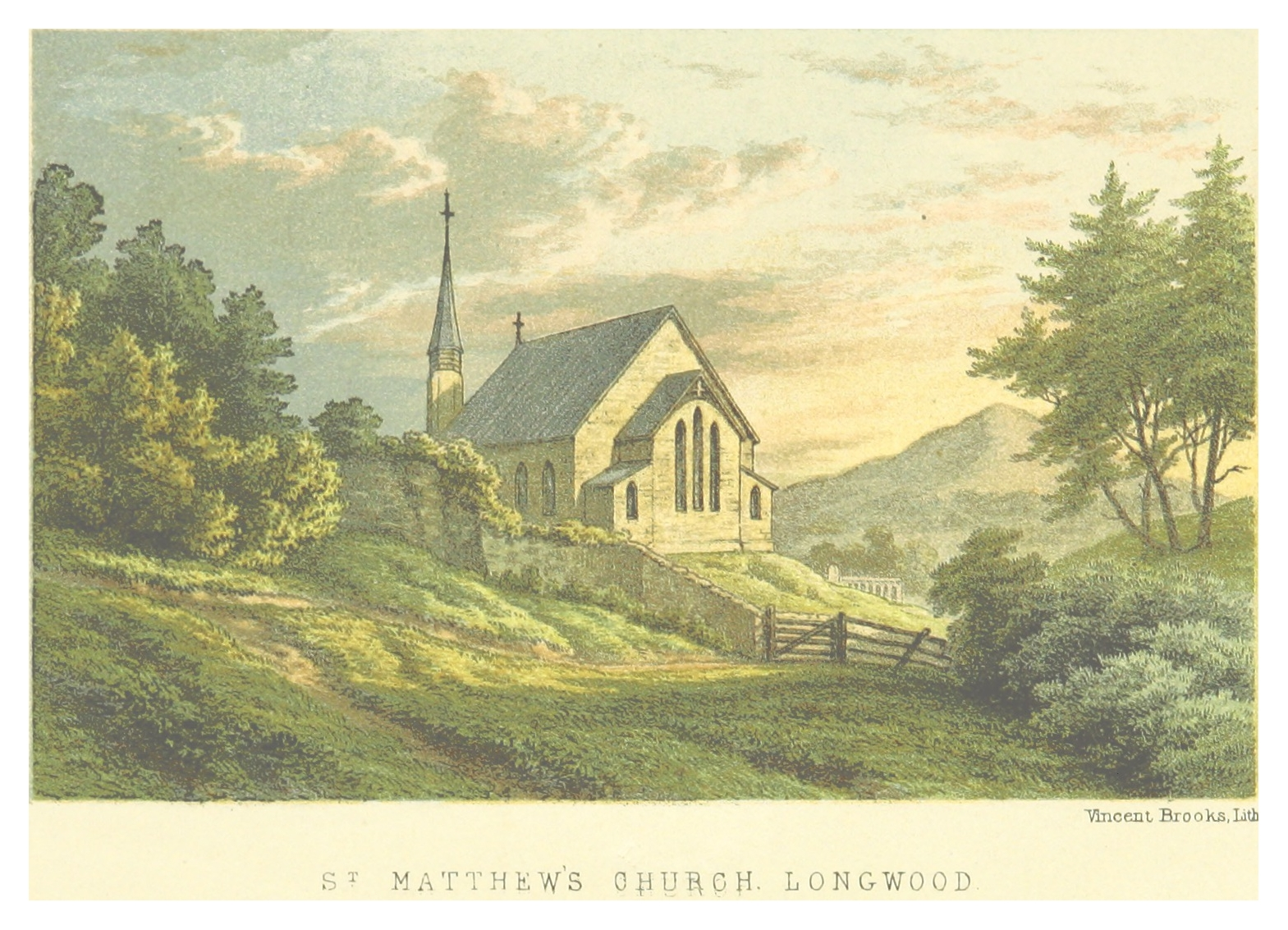
Saint Matthew, 1875

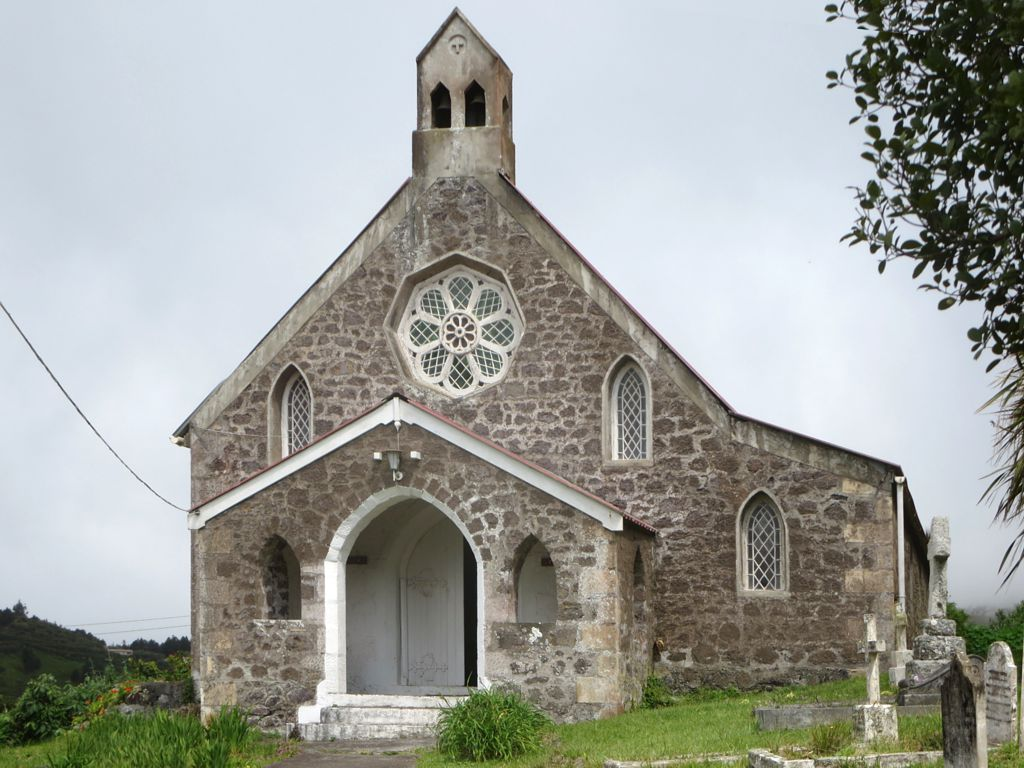
Saint Matthew, 2014

Saint Matthew is a church on the island of Saint Helena in the South Atlantic Ocean, and is part of the Diocese of St Helena. It is situated in Hutt's Gate in the Longwood district. The church opened in 1862. It is designated as a Grade II listed building.

The church was reportedly in a state of disrepair during World War I and was completely rebuilt after.

== Local history ==
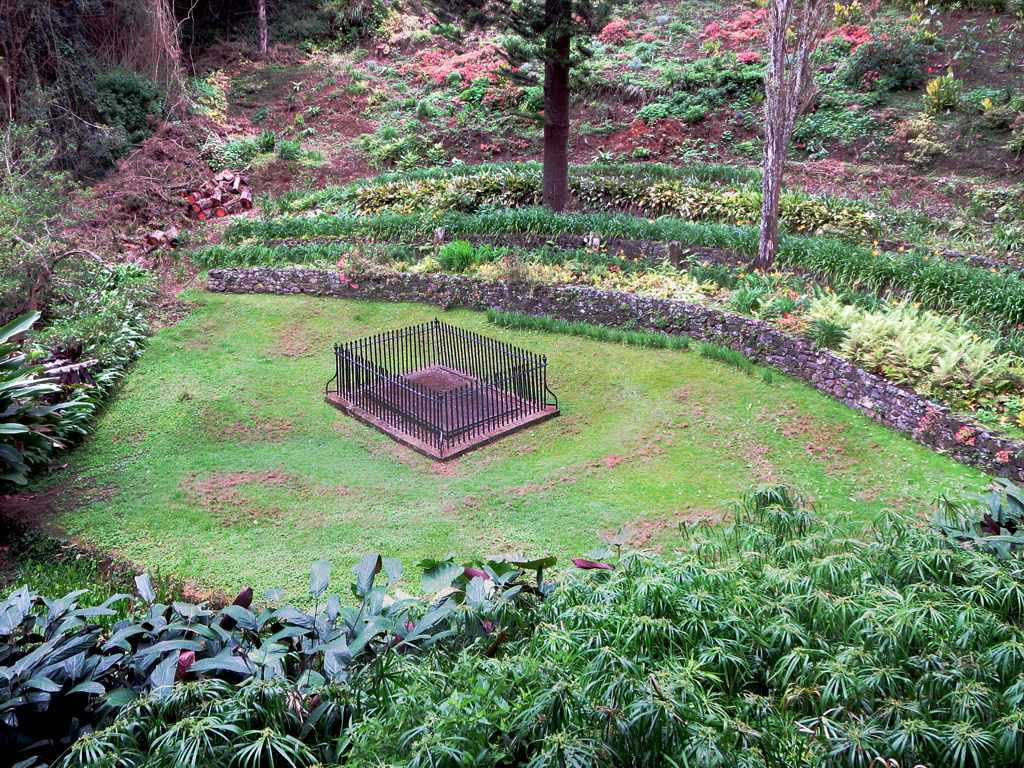
Napoleon's grave

On leaving the University of Oxford in 1676, Edmond Halley visited Saint Helena and set up an observatory with a 24-foot-long (7.3 m) aerial telescope with the intention of studying stars from the Southern Hemisphere. The site of this telescope is near the church. The 680m high hill there is named for him and is called Halley's Mount.

Nearby is Napoleon's grave, where the former French Emperor was buried on his death in 1821. His remains were exhumed in 1840 and returned to France.

== Parish ==
The parish of St Matthew (one of three parishes on the island) has one daughter church, Saint Mark's in Longwood, and a congregation at Levelwood with no church.

== See also ==
- Saint James' Church - the oldest Anglican church south of the Equator, situated in Jamestown
- Saint Paul's Cathedral - the cathedral church of Saint Helena, built in 1851, which replaced another early church on the island
- Saint John's Church - another church built in 1862 on the island
