= Saint Paul's Cathedral (Saint Helena) =

Seat of the bishop overseeing the Anglican Church on two South Atlantic islands

Coordinates: 15.9568°S 5.7203°W

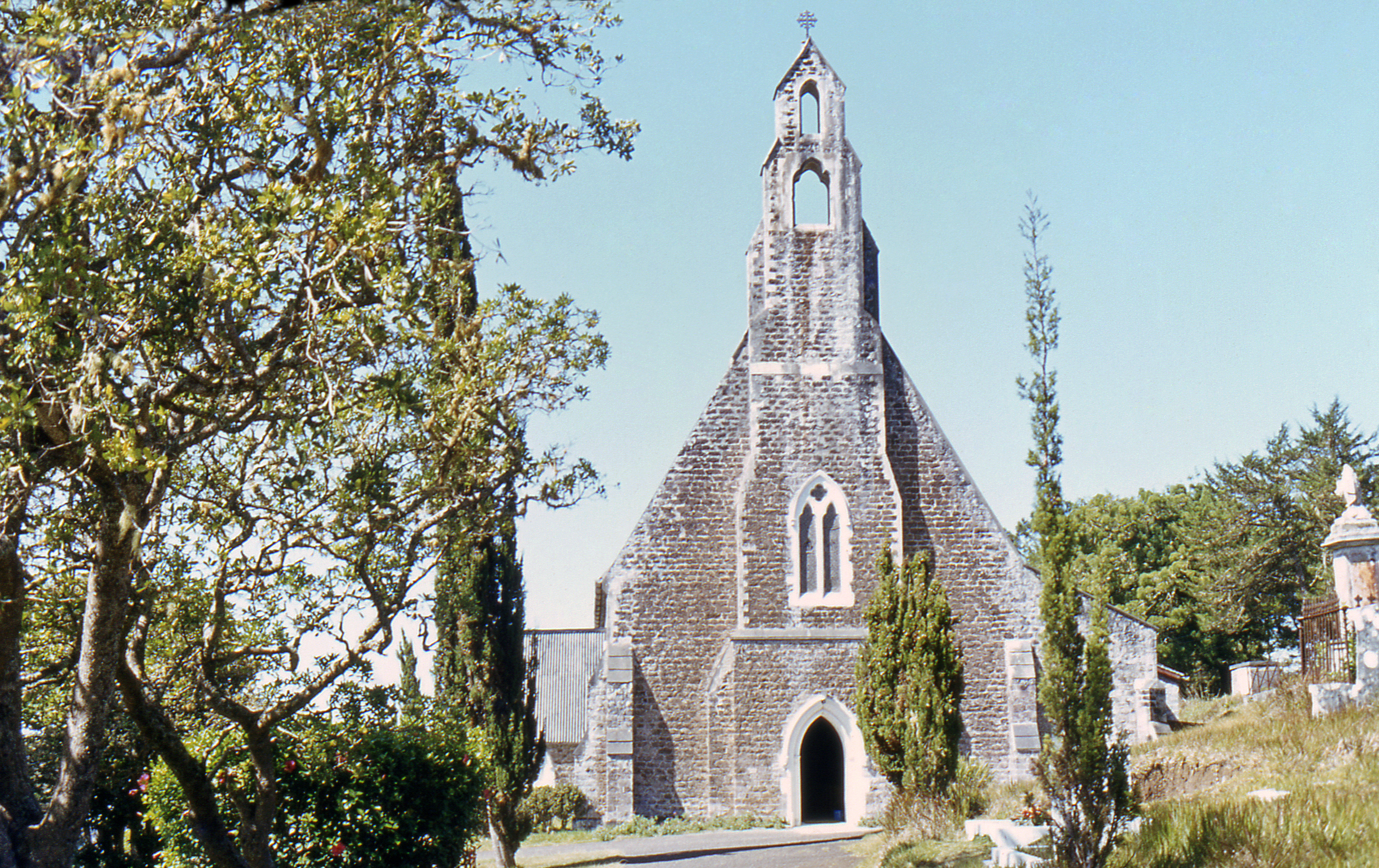
Saint Paul's Cathedral

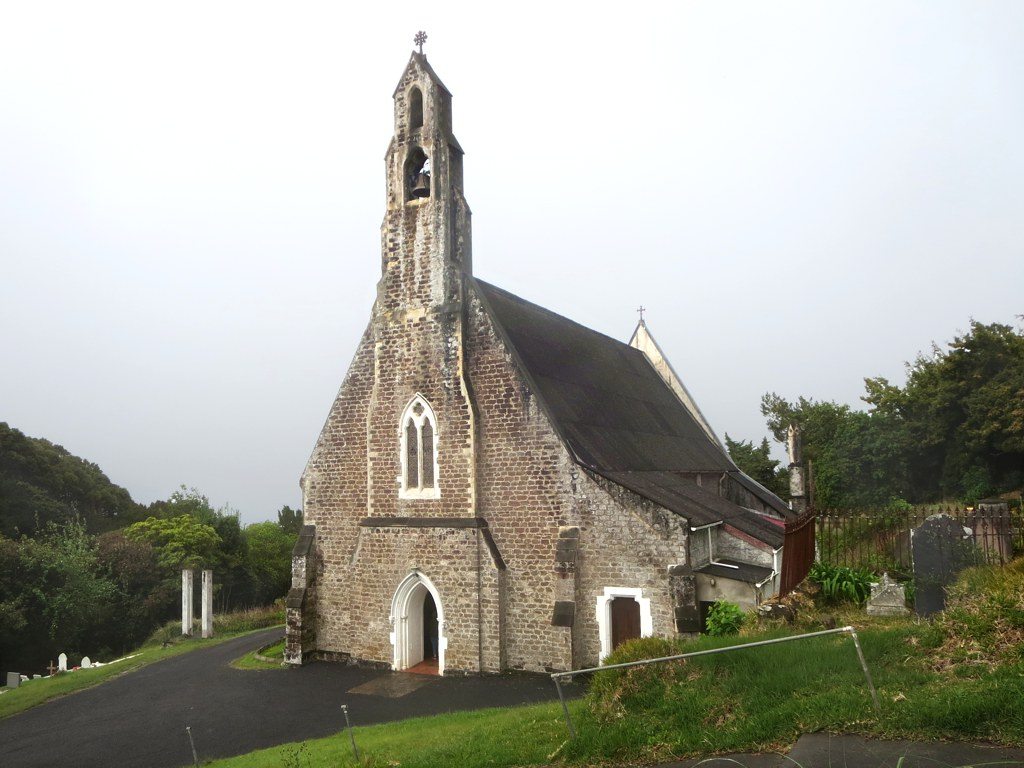

Saint Paul's Cathedral is a cathedral church on the island of St Helena and is part of the Diocese of St Helena. It is located approximately 2 miles south of Jamestown in the district of St Paul's.

It replaced "the Country Church" which existed from the early days of St Helenian colonisation in the late 17th century. Building work on the new church began in 1850, was completed in 1851 and the church became the cathedral in 1859 when the Diocese of St Helena was established. At the time the diocese included the islands of Ascension and Tristan da Cunha, but the latter has since been transferred away.

It is designated as a Grade I listed building. Nearby is Plantation House, also Grade I listed.

== Parish ==
The parish of St Paul's Cathedral (one of three parishes on the island) consists of Saint Paul's Cathedral and four daughter churches:

- Saint Andrew's, Half Tree Hollow
- Saint Helena of the Cross, Blue Hill
- Saint Martin's in the Hills, Thompsons Hill
- Saint Peter's, Sandy Bay

== See also ==
- Saint James's Church - the oldest Anglican church in the southern hemisphere, situated in Jamestown
- Saint Matthew, Hutt's Gate

== Gallery ==
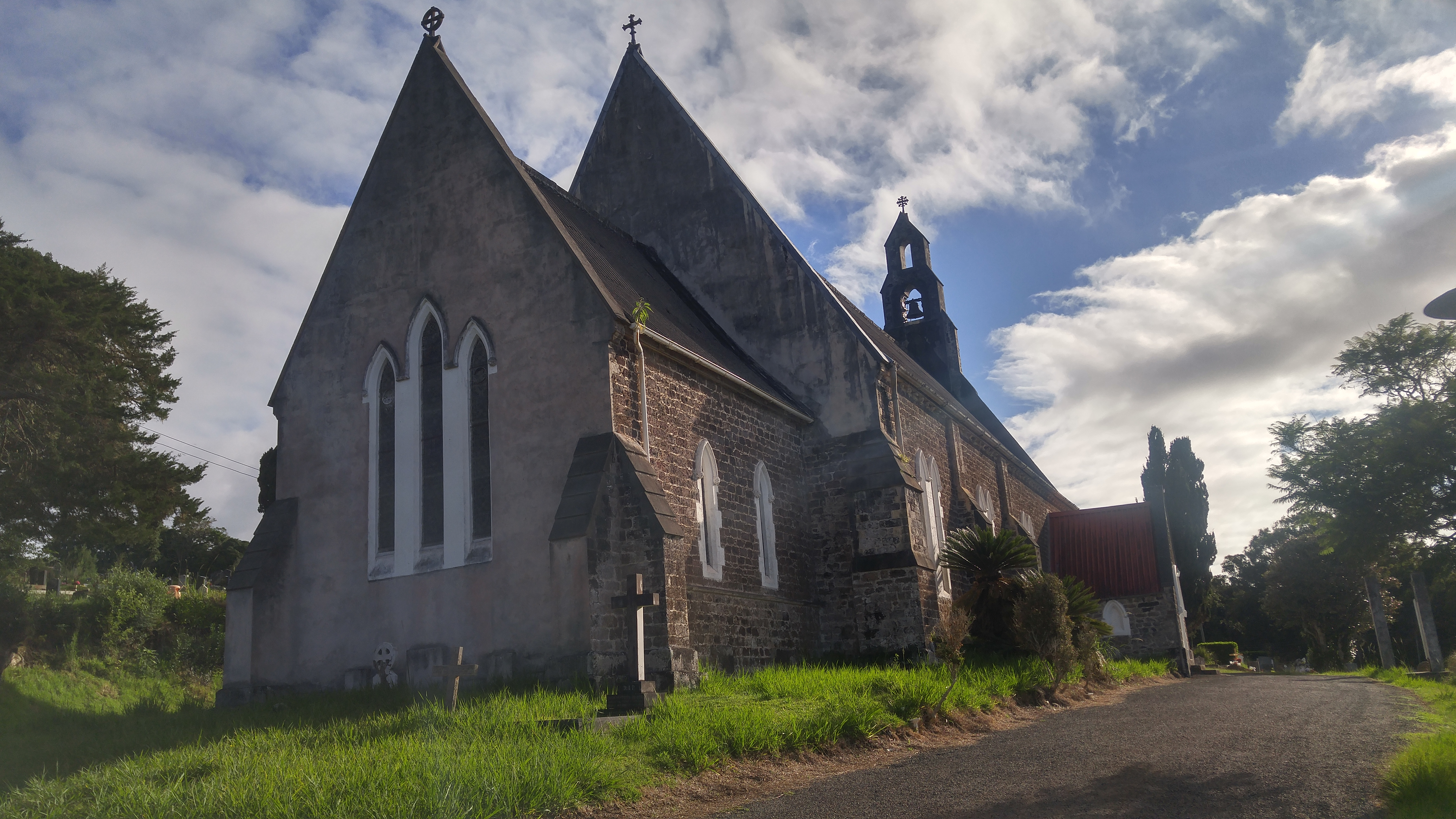
Exterior view from the east side

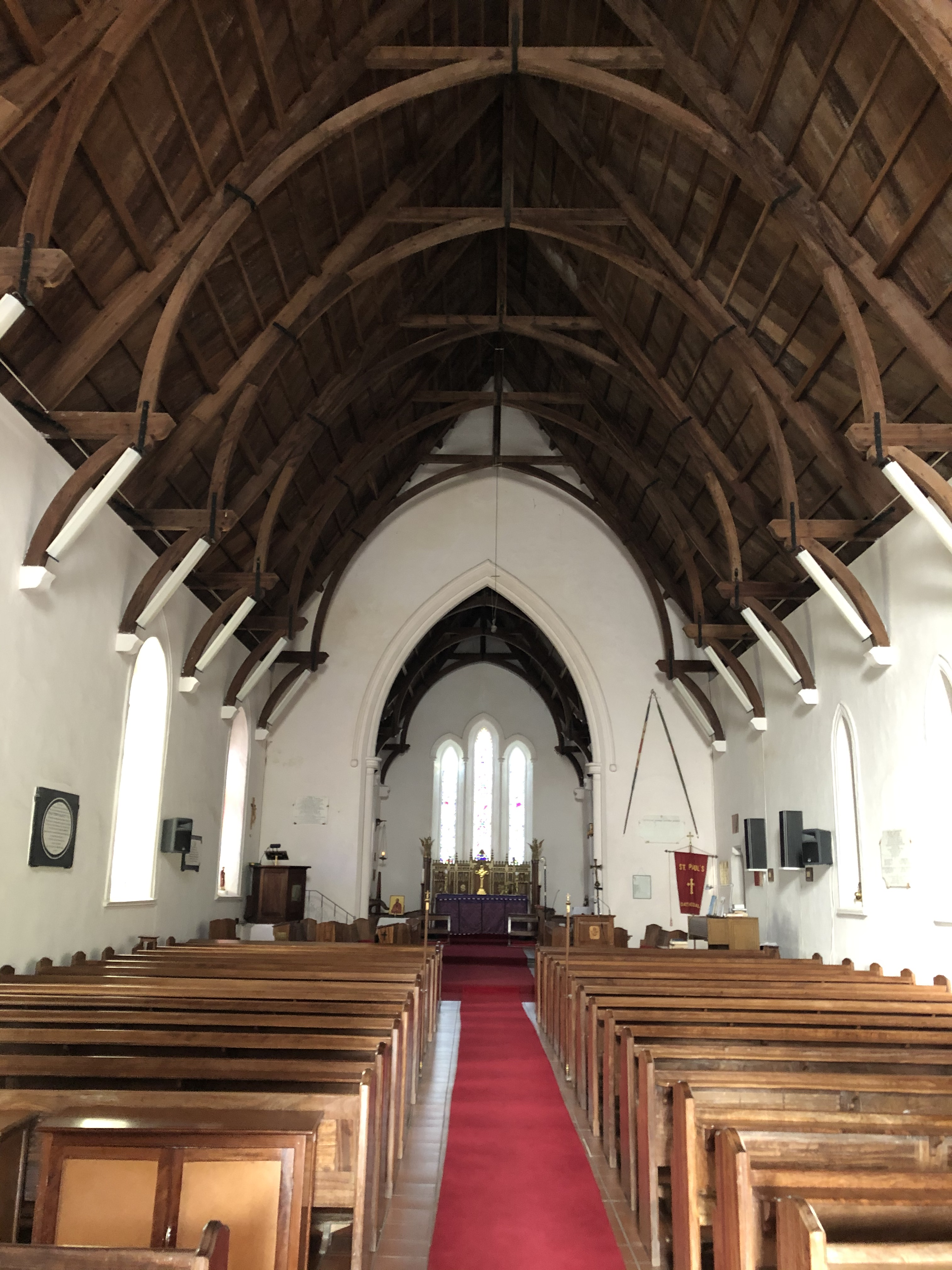
Interior, looking towards the altar

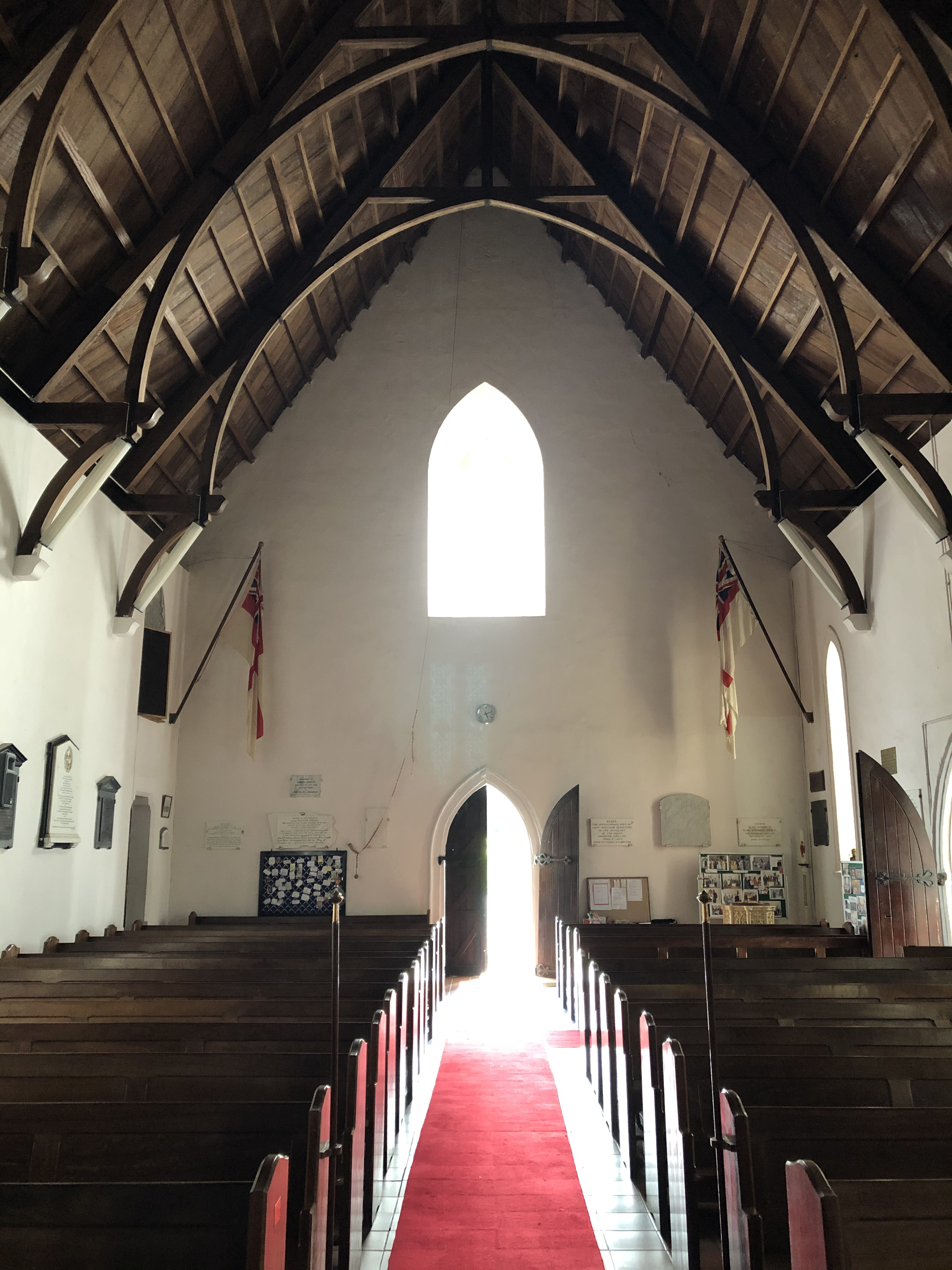
Interior, looking towards the door

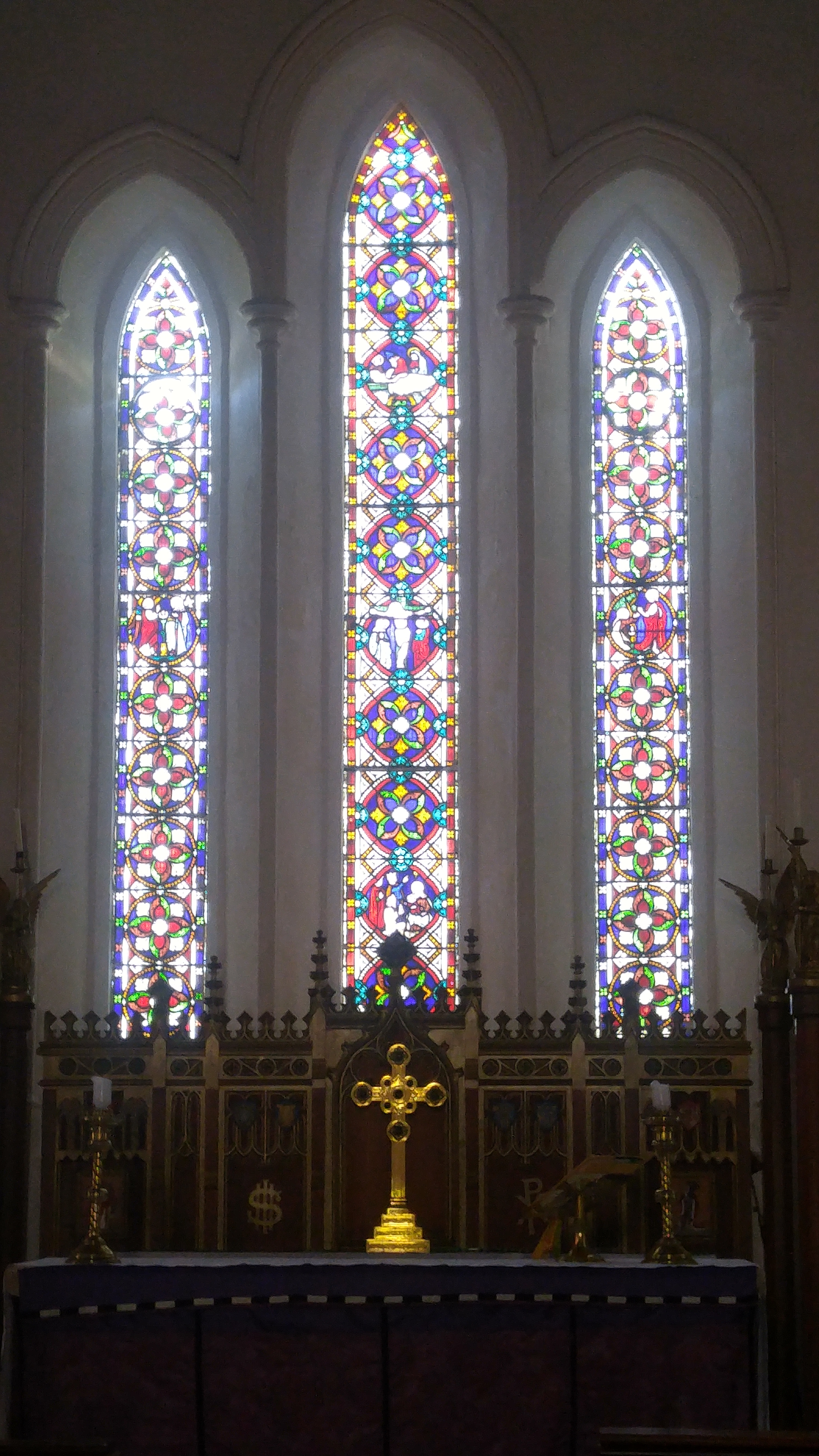
Stained glass window above the altar

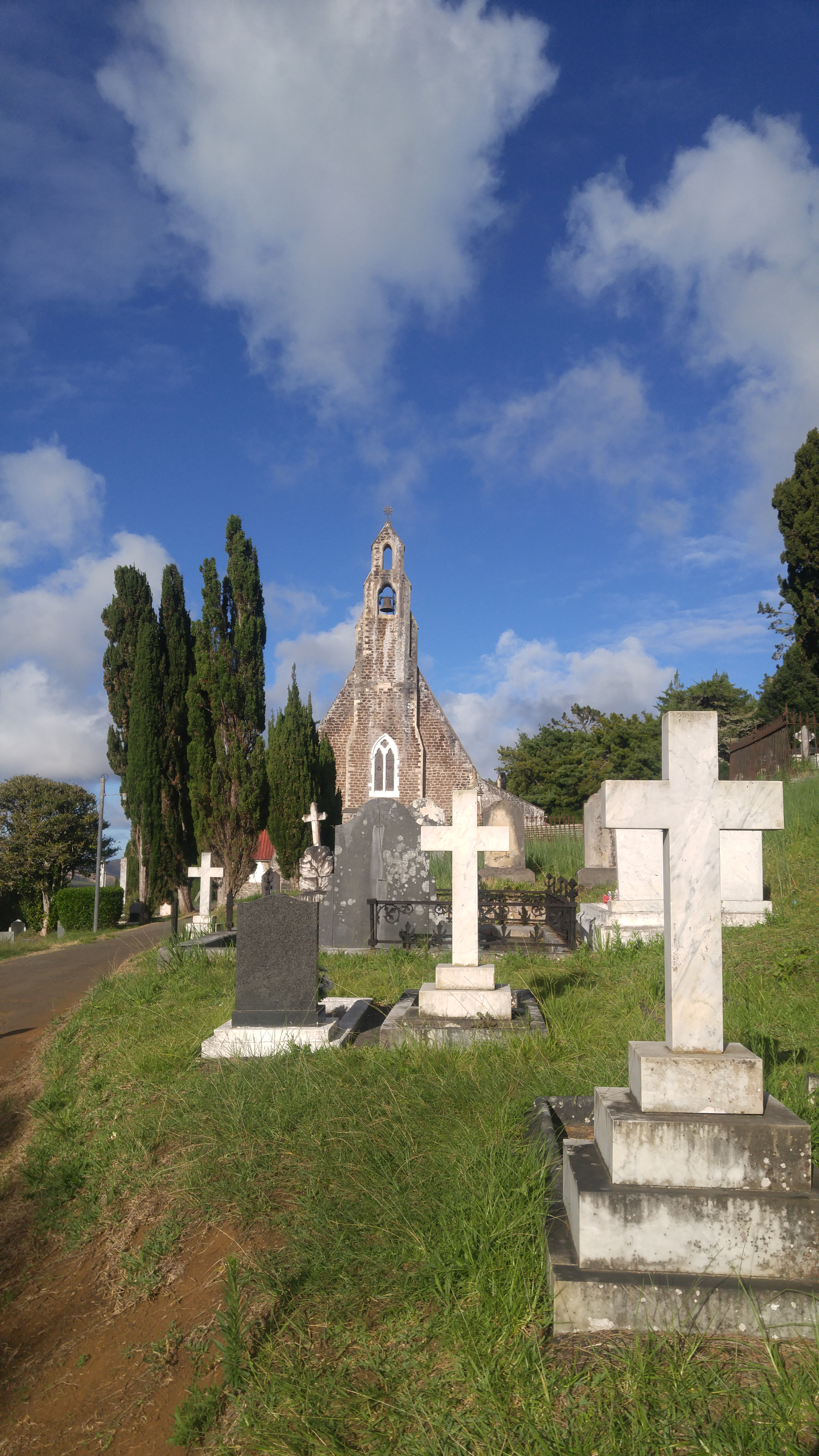
churchyard

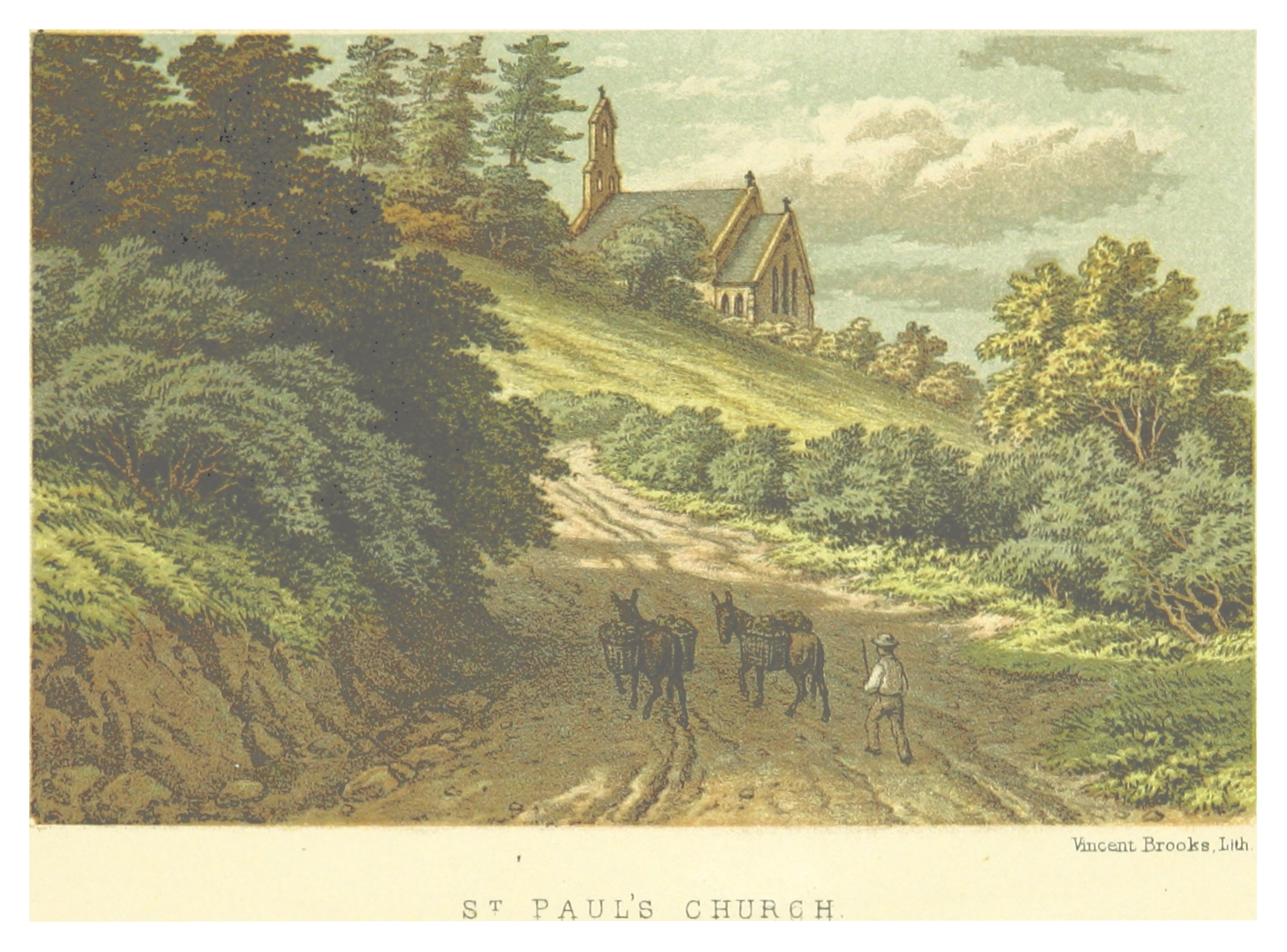
1875 image
