= Saint James' Church, Jamestown =

Oldest Anglican church in the Southern Hemisphere, on the island of Saint Helena

Saint James Church
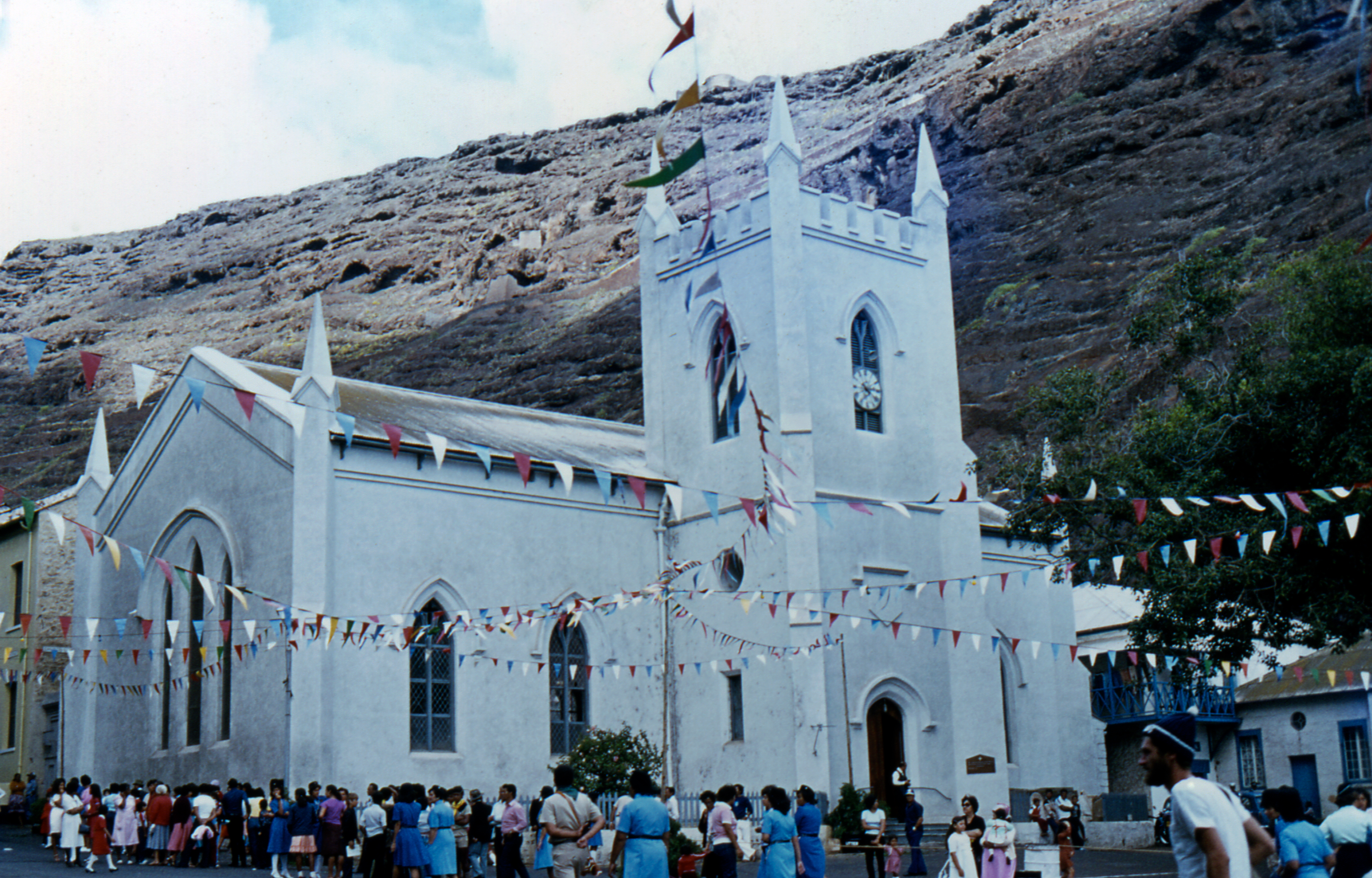
- Saint James' Church, in 1985
- Saint James Church
- 15.9253°S 5.7181°W
- Address: Jamestown, Saint Helena
- Country: British Overseas Territories, United Kingdom
- Denomination: Anglican

History
- Dedication: Saint James the Great; (James the Fisherman)

Architecture
- Completed: 1774

Administration
- Diocese: St Helena
- Parish: Saint James

Saint James' Church is an Anglican church on the island of Saint Helena and is part of the Diocese of St Helena. It is situated in the capital Jamestown and is the oldest Anglican Church in the southern hemisphere; the present building was put up in 1774.

== History ==
Oliver Cromwell granted a new charter to the English East India Company in 1657, which gave the company the right to fortify and colonize any of its establishments. Because of the strategic importance of Saint Helena as a fortress and staging post on the way home from India, the Company claimed the island on 5 May 1659. The building of the fort was commenced immediately and a little town sprang up in the valley with the chapel and was subsequently named Jamestown, after James, Duke of York. The valley, now generally known as James Valley, was called either Saint James Valley or Chapel Valley, after the chapel which was a prominent building as viewed from the bay.

In 1671, the East India Company sent the first of a long sequence of Church of England chaplains. The early, modest little church was replaced by a slightly bigger one in 1674, but was only later named Saint James' church. By 1774 the first parish church in Jamestown showed signs of decay, and so finally a new building was erected. Saint James' is the oldest surviving Anglican church south of the Equator.

Alterations were made in 1843 and 1869. The church once possessed a spire, but this had to be taken down in 1980 for safety reasons. It was restored in 2020.

It is designated as a Grade I listed building, and is one of many listed buildings (a designation for buildings of historic or architectural merit) in Jamestown. It is situated in the historic centre of Jamestown, close to the shore and to The Castle.

== Parish ==
The parish of St James (one of three parishes on the island) consists of Saint James' Church and three daughter churches:

- Saint John's, Upper Jamestown
- Saint Mary's, the Briars
- Saint Michael's, Rupert's Valley

== Gallery ==
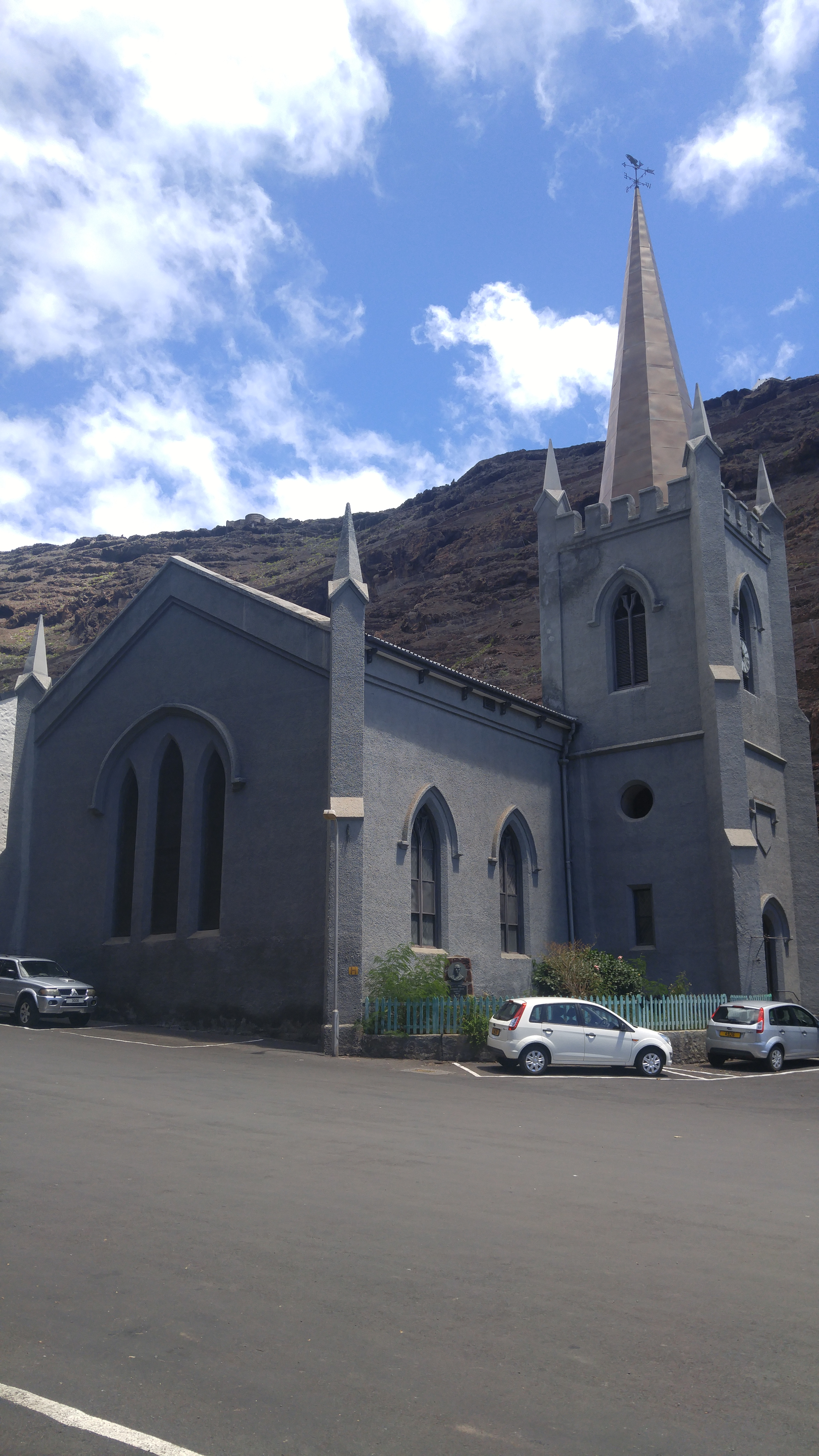
View from NE in 2020, after restoration of the steeple

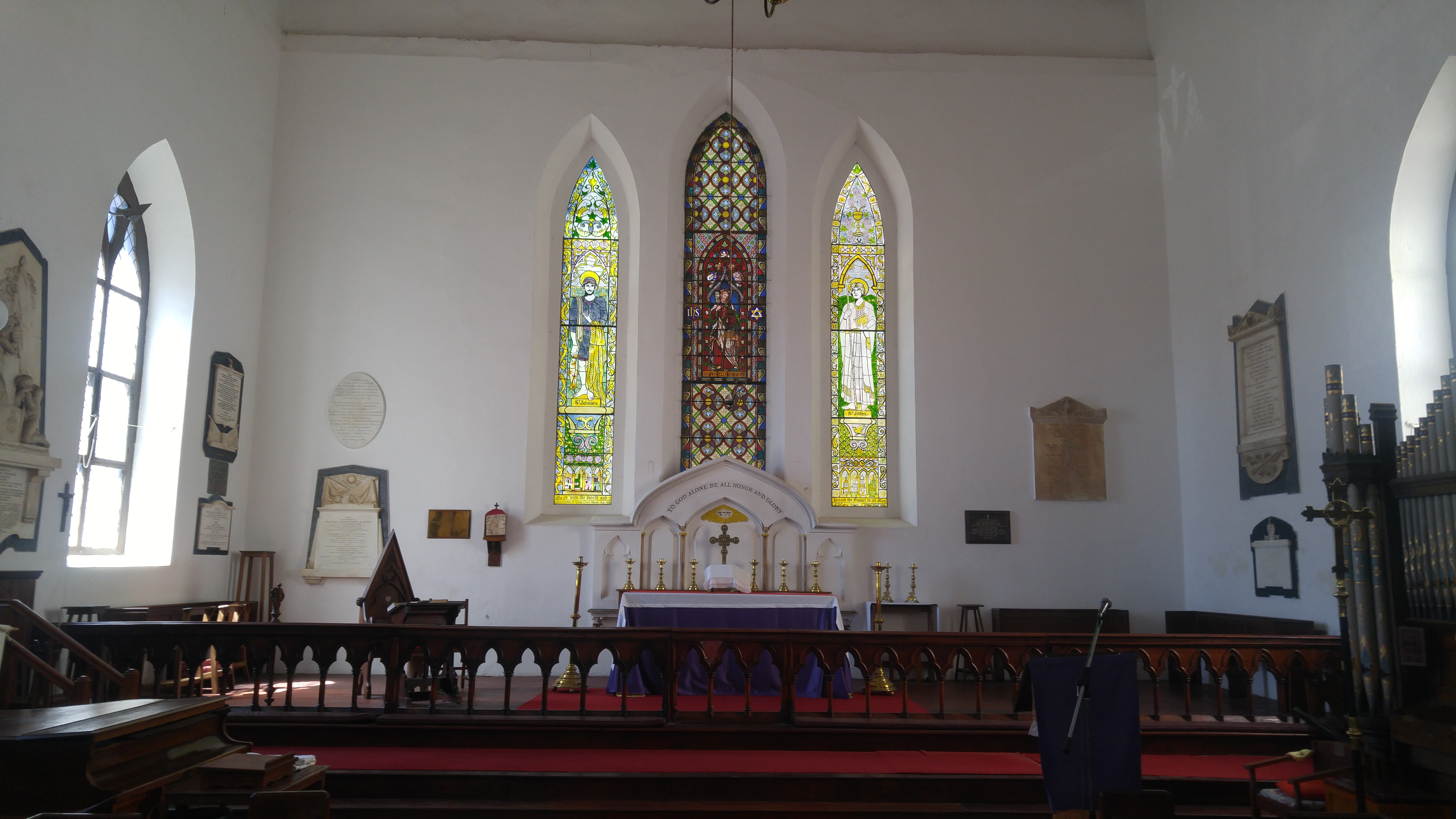
View looking E of the altar and lancet windows

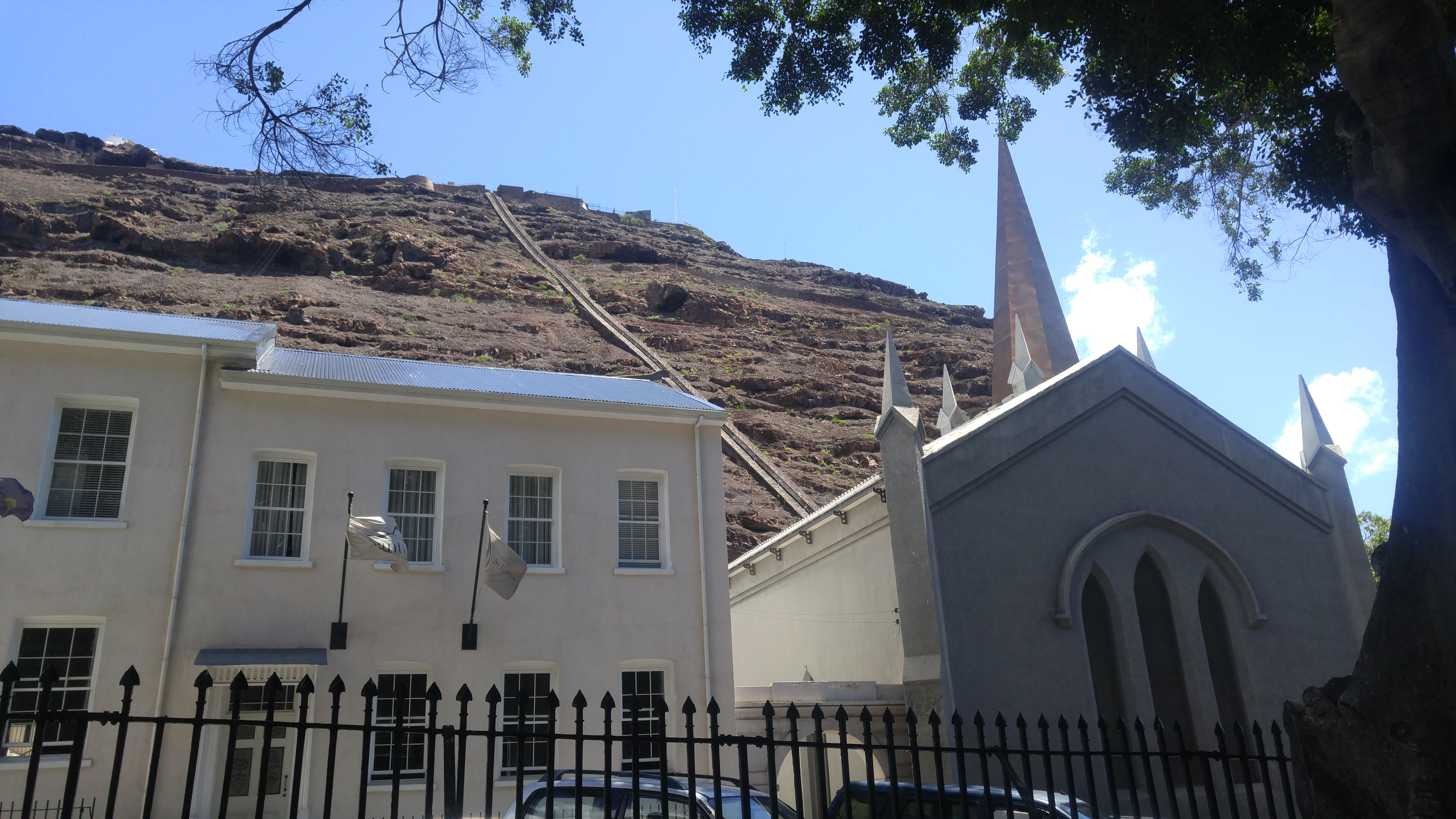
Jacob's ladder visible behind the church

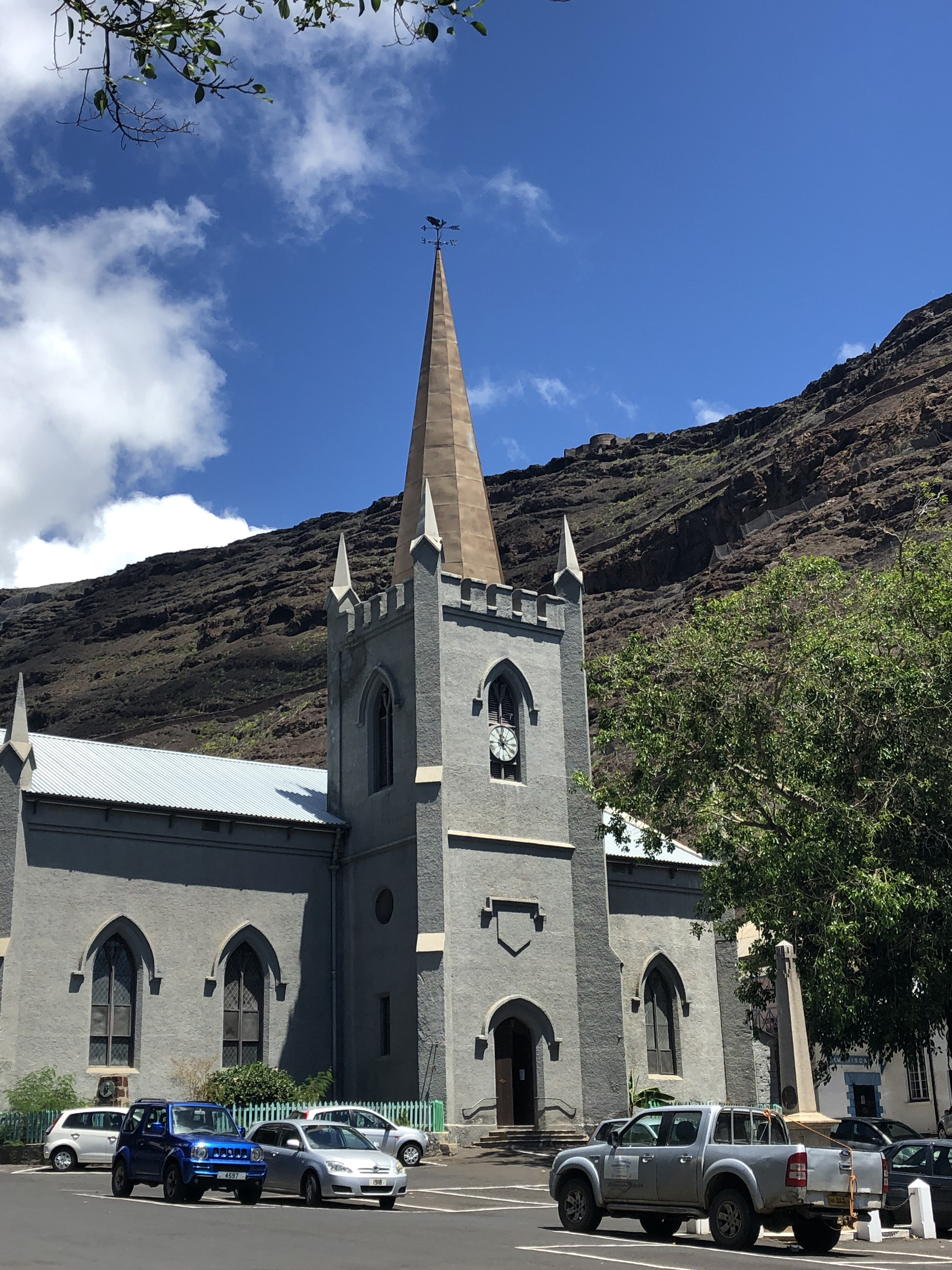
View from N in 2020

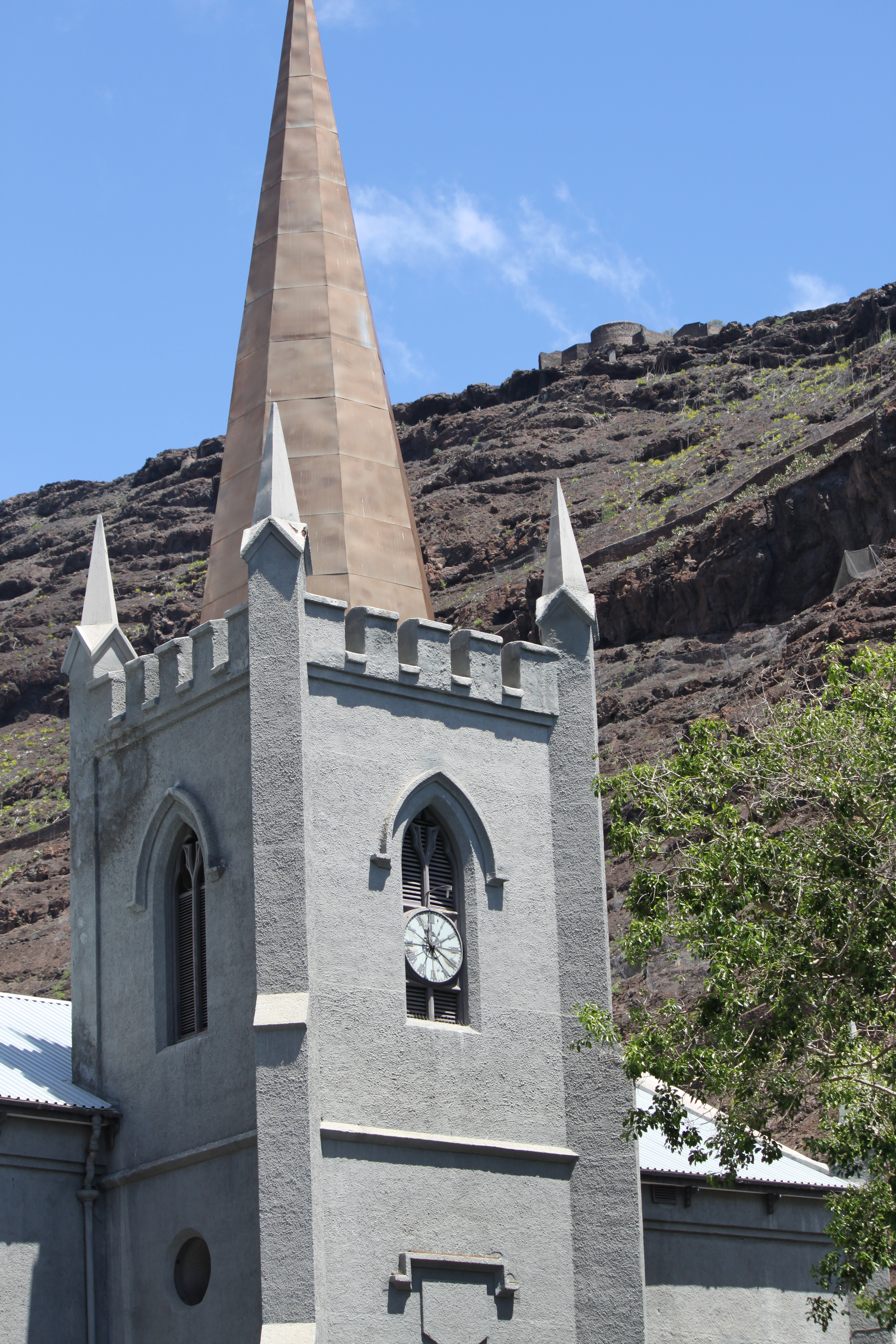
Detail of steeple

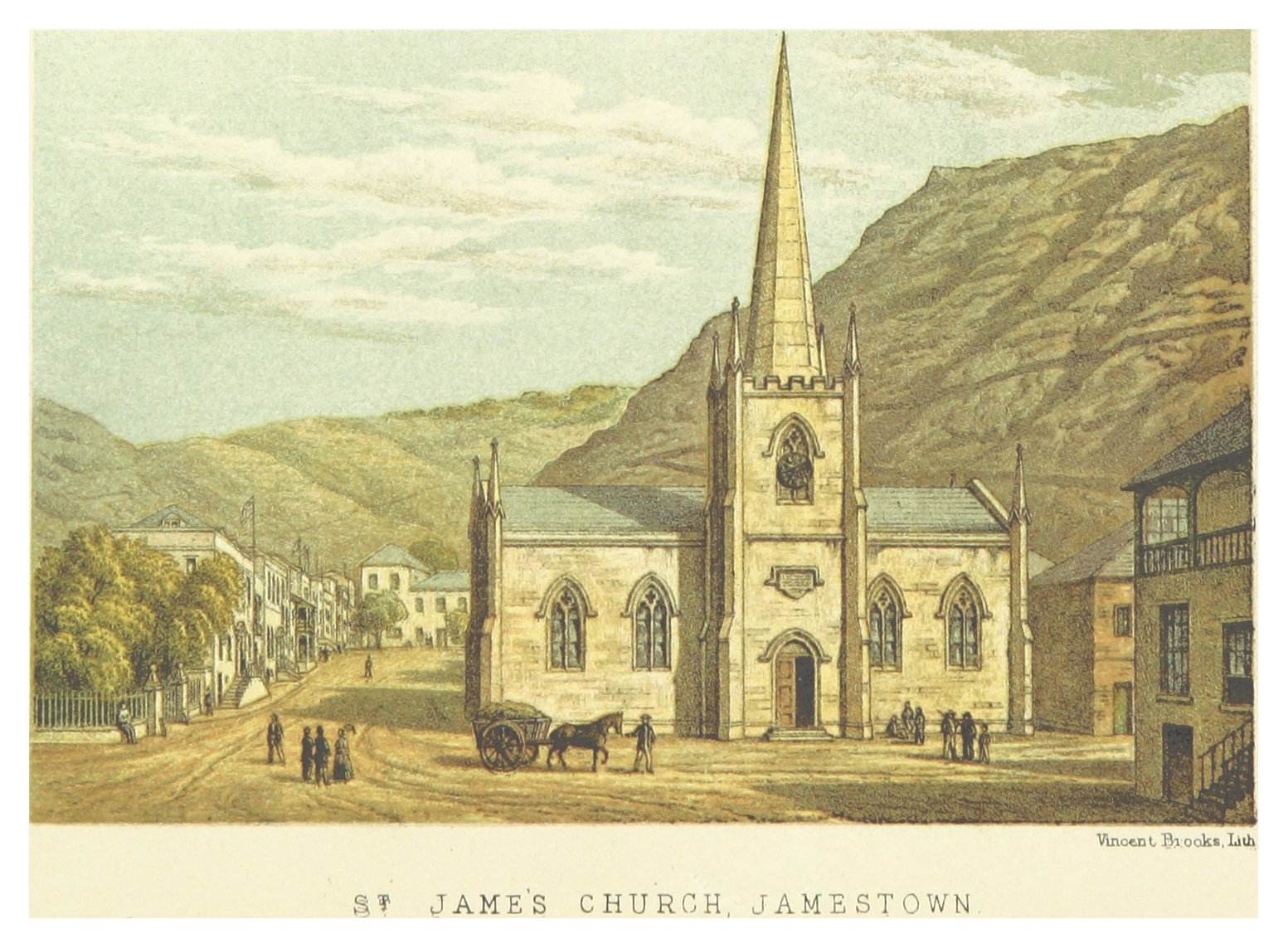
Jamestown in 1875

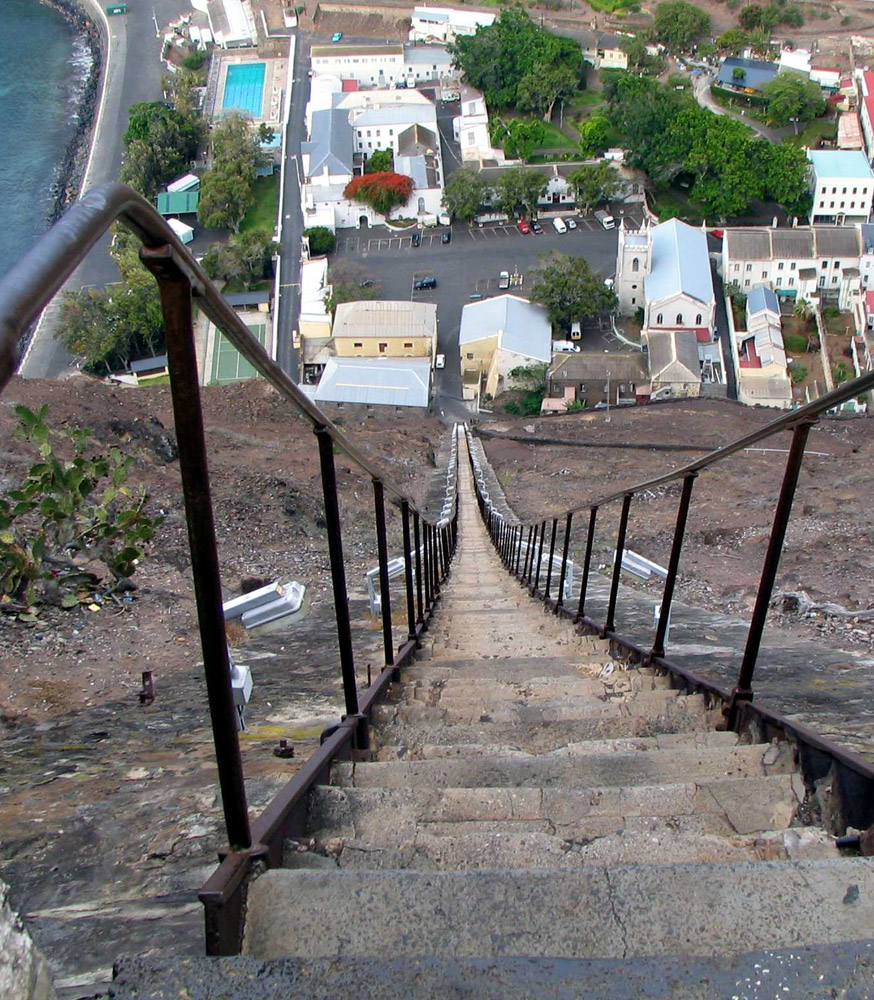
The view down Jacob's Ladder onto historic Jamestown, including Saint James' Church immediately below to the right

== See also ==
- Saint Paul's Cathedral
- Saint Matthew, Hutt's Gate
