= Edward Cannan =

Bishop of St Helena

Edward Alexander Capparis Cannan (25 December 1920 – 18 July 1992) was Bishop of St Helena from 1979 to 1985. He was educated at King's College London, becoming a Bachelor of Divinity (BD) and an Associate of King's College (AKC).

Anglican Communion titles
Preceded by Ken Giggall	Bishop of St Helena; 1979–1985	Succeeded by James Johnson
