= John Holmes (bishop) =

John Garraway Holmes (died September 1904 in Worthing, West Sussex) was an Anglican bishop. He was buried at Broadwater Cemetery in Worthing.

== Education ==
He graduated from University College, Oxford in 1862 and was ordained priest in 1864 by the Bishop of Peterborough. He was a curate at Christ Church, Reading from 1866 to 1869 and St. Mark's Church, Reigate from 1869 to 1870 and St. Mary Magdalene, Wandsworth Common from 1870 - 1883.

== Career ==
He was appointed vicar of St. Philip's Church, Sydenham in 1883 - 1889. In 1888 he was elected to the London School Board representing Greenwich as a member of the "Church Party". He resigned from the board in the following year. He was dean of Grahamstown, South Africa and rector of the St. Michael and St. George Cathedral from 1889 to 1899 and was also archdeacon from 1895.

In July 1899 he was consecrated in St. George's Cathedral, Cape Town as third bishop of St Helena.

He received an honorary doctorate of Divinity (DD) from the University of Oxford in June 1901.
