= Edmund Capper =

Edmund Michael Hubert Capper OBE (12 March 1908 – 6 March 1998) was an Anglican bishop Born on 12 March 1908, and educated at St Joseph's Academy, Blackheath and Durham University, he was ordained in 1933. Following a curacy at St Mary Strood, he emigrated to Africa where he was a Mission Priest at Luatala with Canon Donald Parsons, before promotion to be the Archdeacon of Dar es Salaam then Provost of its cathedral. In 1968, he became Bishop of St Helena, a post he held 1973. He was an assistant bishop of the Diocese in Europe in 1988. He died on 6 March 1998, as an honorary assistant bishop in the Diocese of Southwark.

Anglican Communion titles
Preceded by Harold Beardmore	Bishop of St Helena; 1968–1973	Succeeded by Ken Giggall
