= Harold Beardmore =

Anglican bishop

Harold Beardmore OBE (13 November 1898 – 17 November 1968) was an Anglican bishop.

== Education ==
He was educated at Berkhamsted School and King's College London.

== Career ==
He was a chaplain to the Royal Navy from 1927 to 1947. He was appointed Dean of Port of Spain, Trinidad in 1947, and Archdeacon of Basutoland in 1952. He was appointed Bishop of St Helena in 1960.

== Sources ==
- The Times 19 November 1968

Anglican Communion titles
Preceded by Gilbert Turner	Bishop of St Helena; 1960–1967	Succeeded by Edmund Capper
