= The Castle, Saint Helena =

Government building of Saint Helena

Coordinates: 15.9241°S 5.7177°W

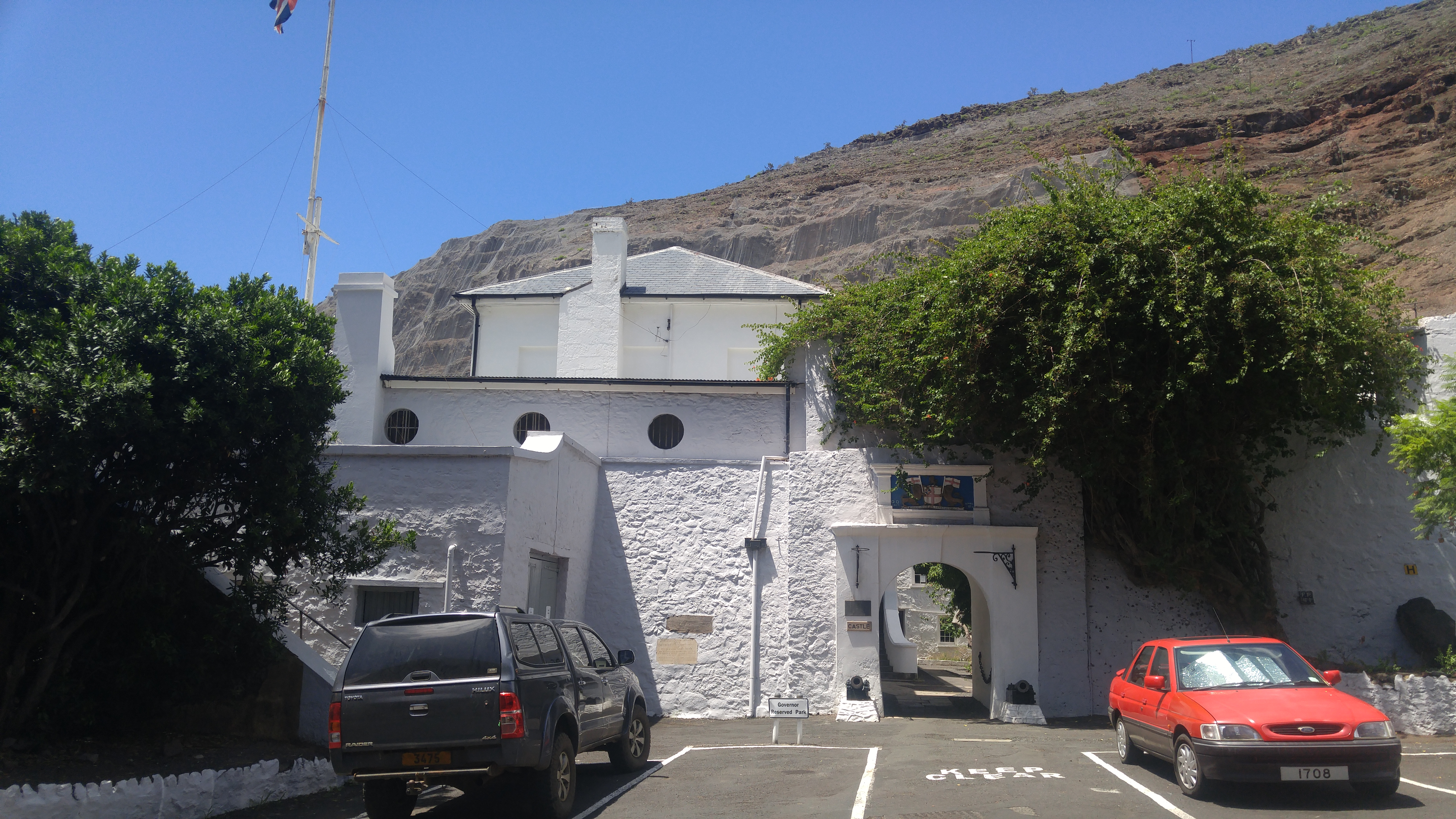
Front entrance to The Castle complex.

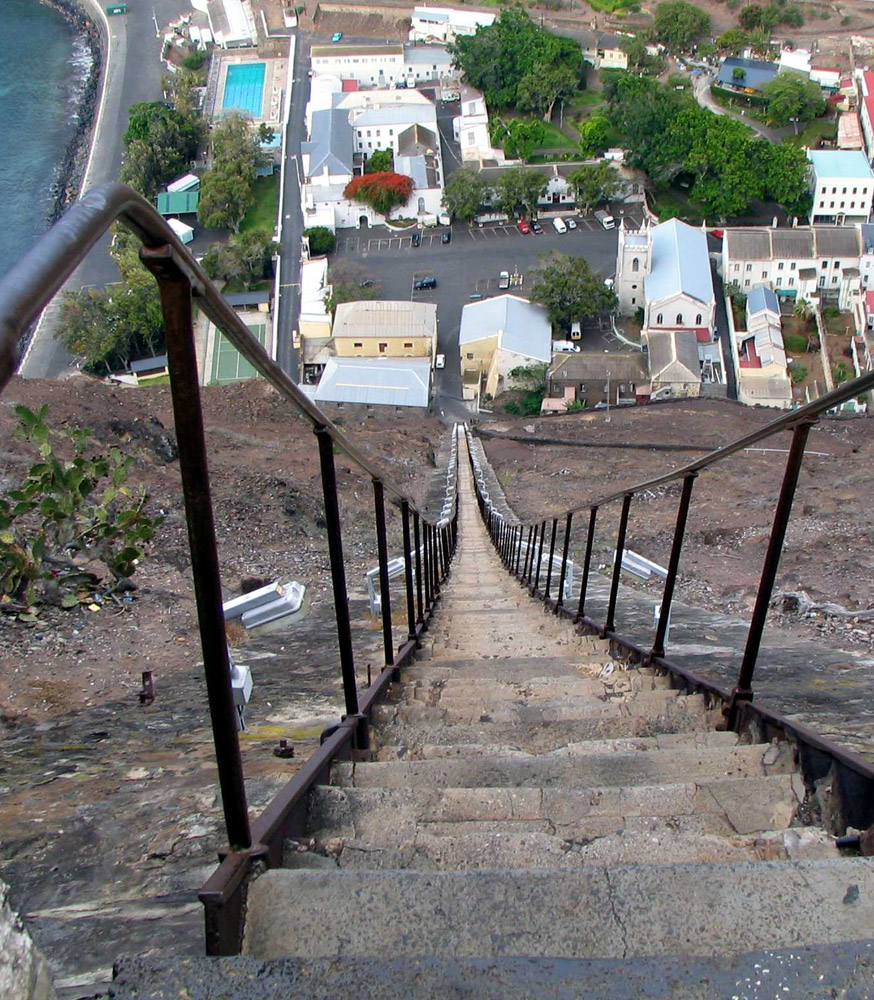
The view down Jacob's Ladder, looking onto The Castle (white buildings between the gardens and the swimming pool).

The Castle is the main government building of the British Overseas Territory of Saint Helena, Ascension and Tristan da Cunha, located in Jamestown on the island of Saint Helena. A Grade I-listed building, the oldest parts of the complex date to 1708, but it was largely reconstructed in the 1860s because of termite damage. It does not have the appearance of a typical castle, though historically the site was part of the East India Company fortifications of Jamestown.

== History ==
Governor John Roberts ordered the construction of the Castle in 1708 on the site of the previous triangular James Fort, close to James Bay. The fort was rebuilt over the next several years to extend across the entire seaward mouth of James Valley and the Castle was immediately behind it to the east. It replaced the decrepit Fort House as the official residence of the governor of Saint Helena and also housed the island's administrative offices. It was a modest one-storey building with a low basement; an upper storey was added in 1776. The Castle was rebuilt in 1867 to repair termite damage and has remained essentially the same ever since.

== Present day ==
Plantation House, in the District of Saint Paul's, became the governor's official residence in 1792, although the Governor's office remains in the Castle. Most of the main administrative offices of the colony, including the Chief Secretary’s, are in the Castle and the Legislative Council meets in the Council Chamber on the second floor. Also part of the complex are the Printing Office, Savings Bank and the colony's archives. Only the foyer is open to the public.

== See also ==
- St James church
- High Knoll Fort
- History of Saint Helena
