= Gilbert Turner =

Gilbert Price Lloyd Turner OBE (8 May 1888 – 1968) was a bishop in the Anglican church.

== Biography ==
The son of Major G. H. Turner, he was educated at the Collegiate School for Boys in Victoria, British Columbia and at St Augustine's College, Canterbury. In 1912, he was ordained as a priest. He was a curate at St. Paul's Church, Cape Town from 1920 to 1922, and again from 1925 to 1927, then rector. In 1939, he was appointed Bishop of St. Helena. In 1959 he was admitted as an Officer of the Most Excellent Order of the British Empire.

== Notes and references ==
- The Times 6 November 1968

Anglican Church of Southern Africa titles
Preceded by Charles Arthur William Aylen	Bishop of St Helena; 1939-1960	Succeeded by Harold Beardmore
