= Jamestown, Saint Helena =

Capital and chief port of Saint Helena

Jamestown
- City of James Town
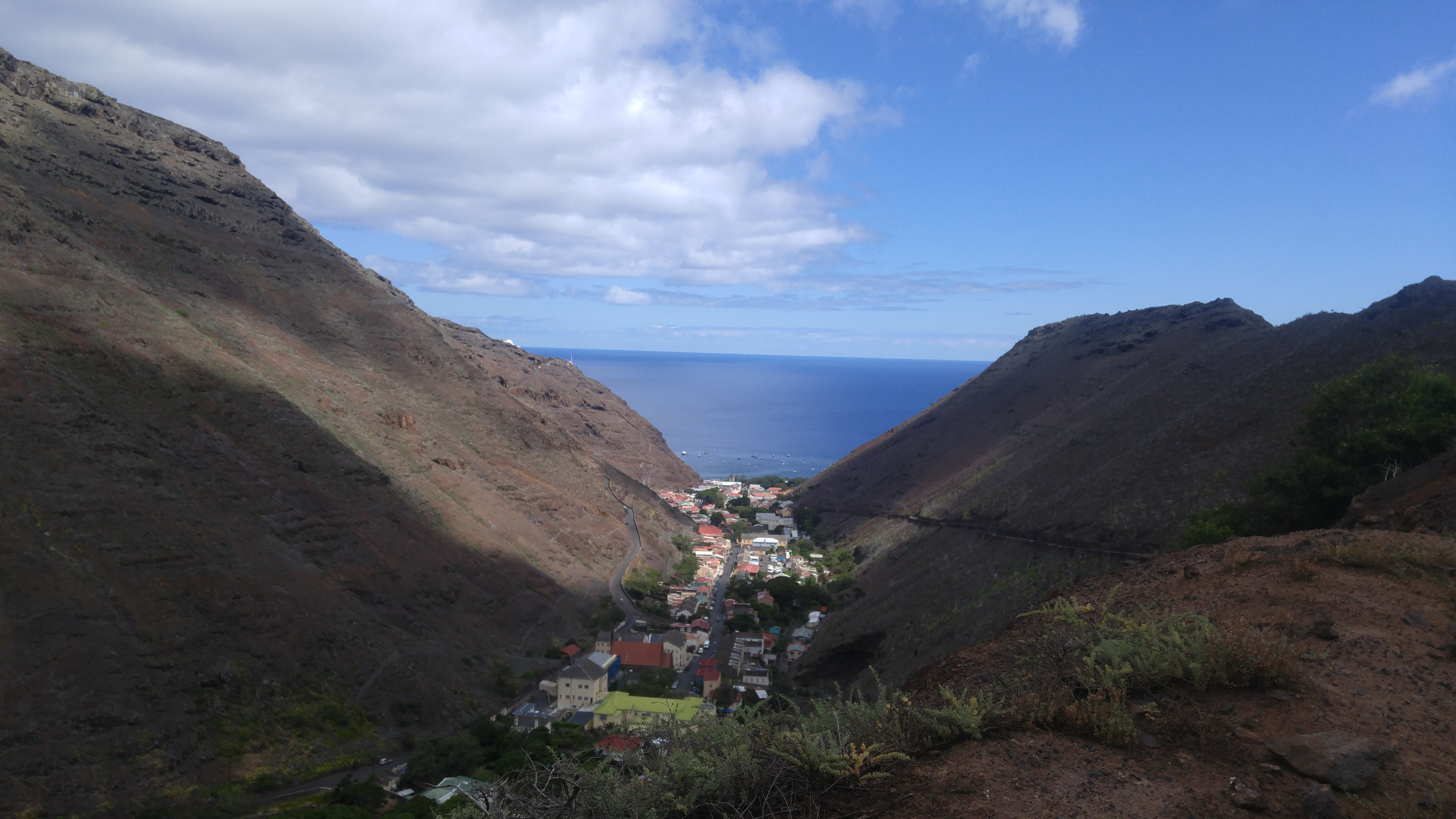
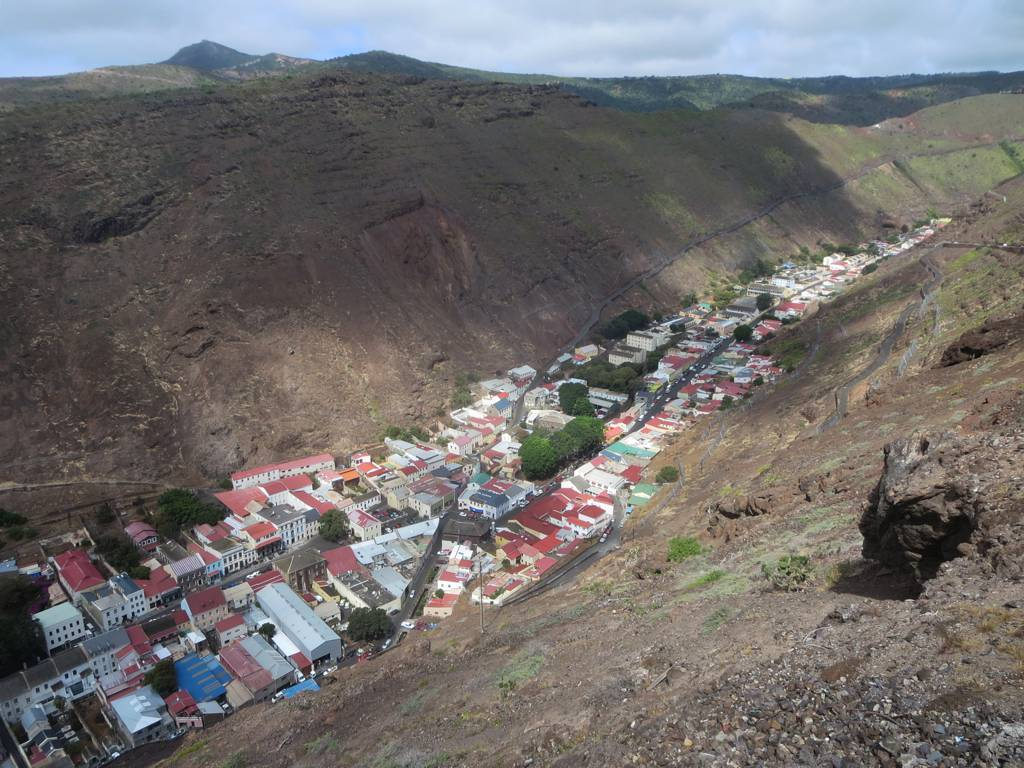
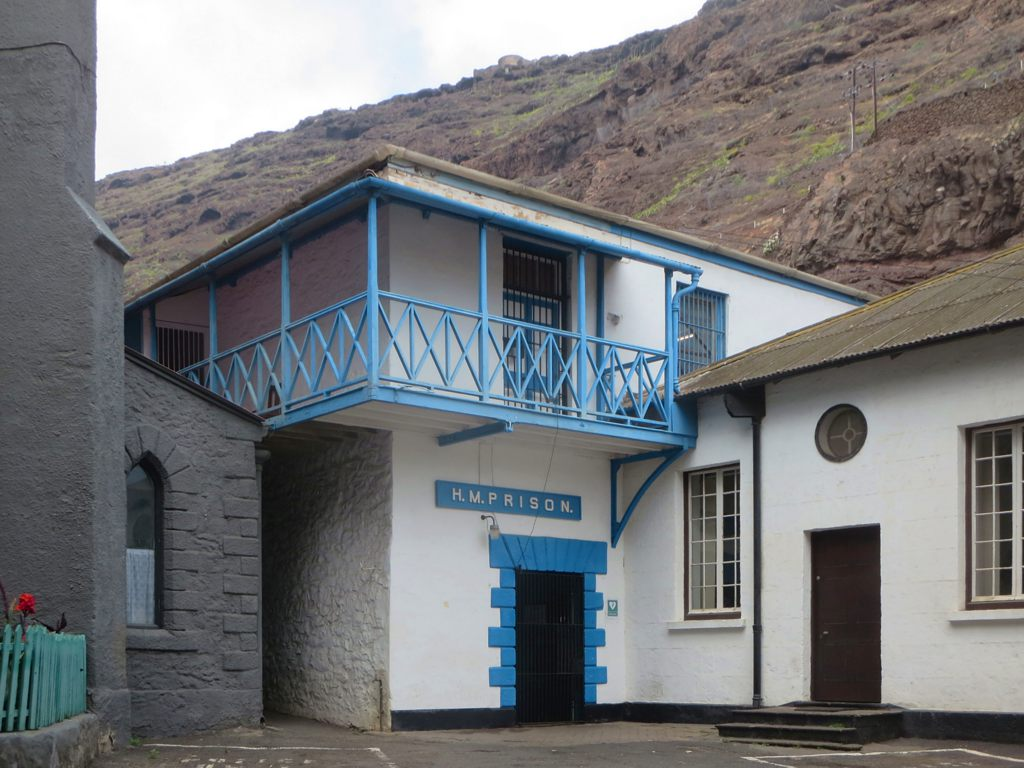
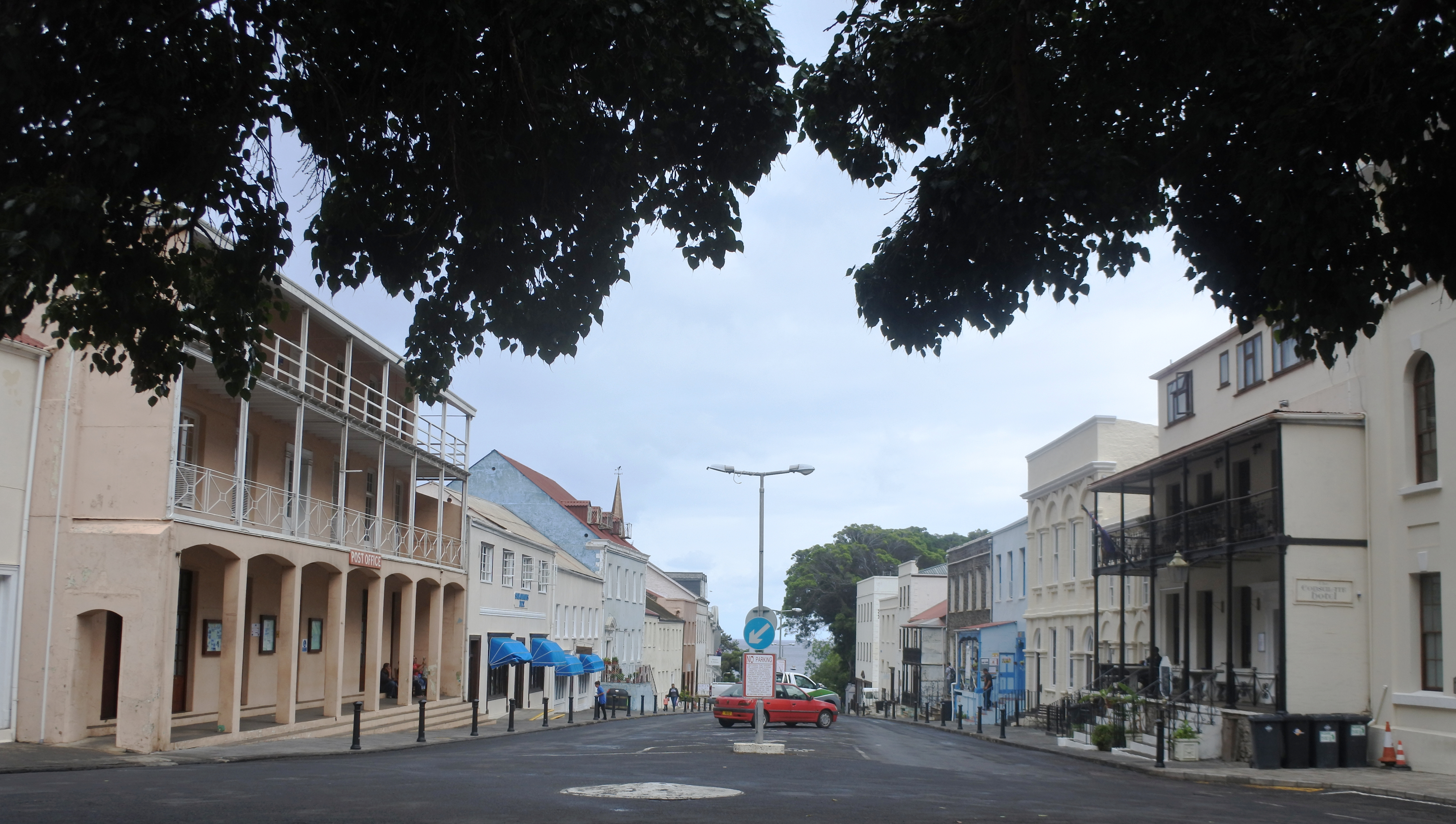

- Jamestown in Saint Helena
- Coordinates: 15°55′28″S 5°43′5″W
- Sovereign state: United Kingdom
- British overseas territory: Saint Helena, Ascension and Tristan da Cunha
- Island: Saint Helena
- Status: City (1859); District
- First settled: 1659
- Founder: English East India Company
- Named for: James, Duke of York
- Capital of: Saint Helena; Saint Helena, Ascension and Tristan da Cunha

Area
  - City: 1.4 sq mi (3.6 km^{2})

Population (2021)
  - City: 625
  - Density: 514/sq mi (198.3/km^{2})
  - Urban: 1,614 (Jamestown and Half Tree Hollow)
- Time zone: UTC+0 (GMT)
- Area code: +290 2xxx

Jamestown is the capital city of the British Overseas Territory of Saint Helena, Ascension and Tristan da Cunha, located on the island of Saint Helena in the South Atlantic Ocean. It is also the historic main settlement of the island and is on its north-western coast. Before the development of the port at Rupert's Bay, it was the island's only port and the centre of the island's road and communications network. It was founded when colonists from the English East India Company settled on the island in 1659 and was briefly occupied by the Dutch East India Company in 1673 before being recaptured. Many of the buildings built by the East India Company in the 18th century survive and give the town its distinctive Georgian flavour.

The city briefly hosted Napoleon in 1815 during his exile on St. Helena and later served as a base for the Royal Navy's efforts to suppress the slave trade. It had no role during the First World War and only played a minor role during the Second World War.

== History ==
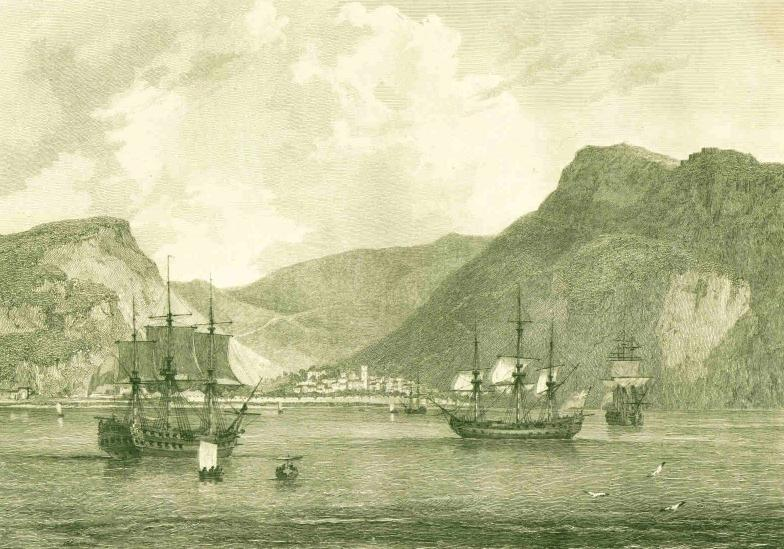
A view of James Bay in 1794

Jamestown was founded in 1659 by the East India Company and is named after James, Duke of York, the future King James II of England. A fort, originally named the Castle of St John, was quickly built and, with the restoration of the monarchy in 1660, the fort was renamed James Fort, the town Jamestown and the valley James Valley. The fort and associated gun batteries dominated James Bay and were sporadically improved over the years. In January 1673 the Dutch East India Company briefly seized control of the island until the English East India Company recaptured it in May. Since then the town has been continuously inhabited under English and then British rule.

After his defeat in the Battle of Waterloo in June 1815 and the subsequent occupation of Paris, the Emperor of the French, Napoleon, surrendered to the British and was exiled to St Helena. He arrived on 21 October aboard the 74-gun ship HMS Bellerophon and resided at the Briars in Jamestown for several months until he was transferred to Longwood House in a more remote part of the island in December. Jamestown was chosen to host a vice admiralty court and a naval base for British efforts to stop the slave traffic between Africa and the Americas. Captured slave ships were often brought to Jamestown to be sold and their cargos were off-loaded in Rupert's Valley. By the time that the naval station was closed in the 1870s, an estimated 25,000 slaves had been rescued, although about 5,000 died shortly after arrival and were buried in Rupert's Valley. Their graves, long lost, were rediscovered in 2006 in conjunction with preliminary digging for the airport. A team of archaeologists arrived in mid-2008 to excavate the graves. Some of the finds from the excavations are on exhibit at the International Slavery Museum in Liverpool, England.

The island was too isolated to play any role in the First World War and only played a minimal one during the Second World War. The oil tanker RFA Darkdale was sunk by the German submarine U-68 in James Bay on 22 October 1941 with only nine of the 50-man crew surviving. She had been sent to St Helena a few months earlier to refuel ships operating in the South Atlantic. The wreck continued to leak small amounts of oil until June 2015 when the Ministry of Defence sent a team of divers to pump out all the remaining oil.

== Geography and description ==
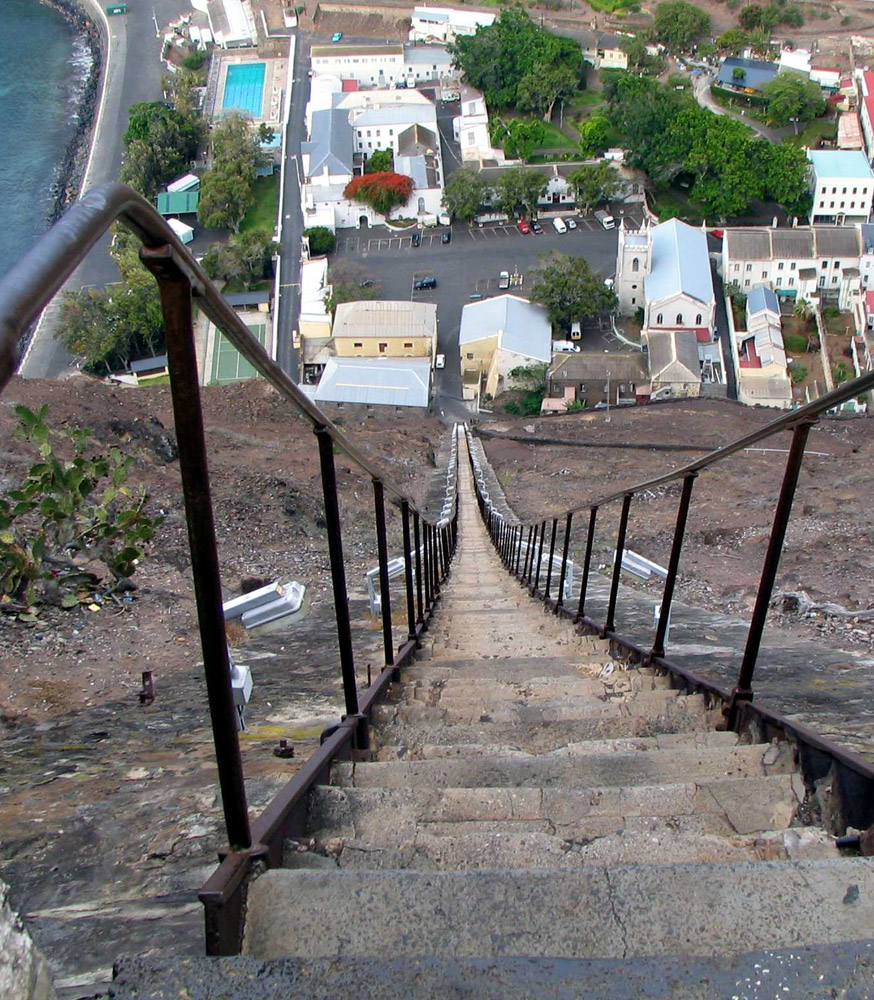
View down Jacob's Ladder

The city is built on igneous rock in the James Valley, sandwiched between steep cliffs. It is therefore rather long and thin. The walls of the valley are rough and steep, and rockfalls have been a problem, although now minimised by netting. A small stream, the Run, runs through the valley. The city is commonly divided into lower and upper parts, depending on the distance up James Valley. Being the island's main port (and with the Saint Helena Airport only receiving its first scheduled flight in October 2017) the city is still currently the main entrance to the island for visitors. Despite not being connected to Jamestown proper by road, Rupert's Valley, the next valley north, is also part of the city. It houses much of the island's infrastructure, such as its power station and associated fuel storage, and a one-ship wharf was completed in June 2016.

The city has over 100 listed buildings, mostly from the Georgian era. Main Street has been described as "one of the best examples of unspoilt Georgian architecture anywhere in the world." Many buildings are built out of local volcanic rock. St James' Church dates from 1772 and is the oldest Anglican church in the Southern Hemisphere. Another of the city's prominent features is Jacob's Ladder, a staircase of 699 steps, built in 1829 to connect Jamestown to the former fort on Ladder Hill. The ladder is very popular with tourists, is lit at night and a timed run takes place there every year, with people coming from all over the world to take part. The Museum of Saint Helena is situated in Jamestown, one of two museums on the island (the other being Longwood House).

== Formal status ==
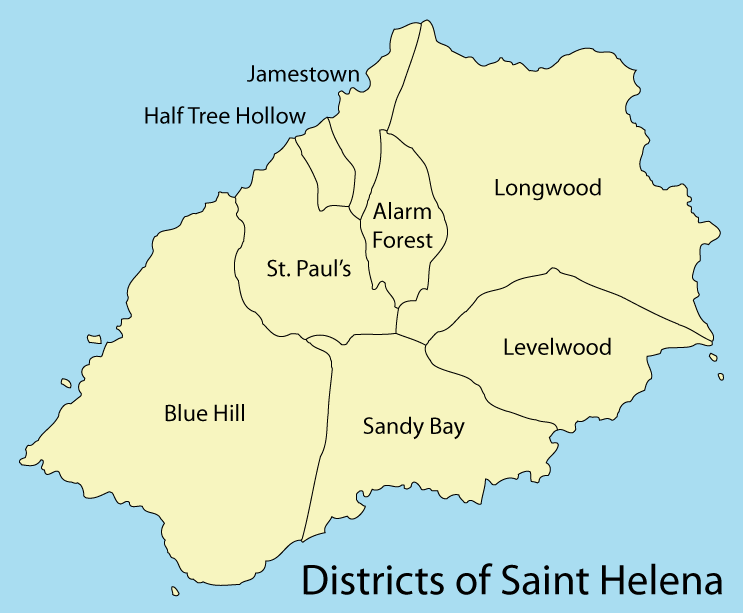
Map of the districts of the island

Jamestown is formally a city, a status granted by Queen Victoria in 1859, and its full name is the "City of James Town". It is also one of the 8 districts (administrative divisions) and is the capital of both the island of Saint Helena and the British overseas territory of Saint Helena, Ascension and Tristan da Cunha. The Castle, one of the oldest buildings in the city, is one of the main government buildings.

== Climate ==
Jamestown features a tropical hot desert climate (Köppen climate classification: BWh) with essentially consistent temperatures throughout the year. Despite the fact that the city has a desert climate, its temperatures are moderated by the adjacent ocean and cold currents therein, leading to a cool climate for the deep tropical latitude. As a result, it seldom gets very hot in Jamestown. The temperature in the Jamestown area is some 5 °C (9 °F) warmer than the rest of the island, because of the difference in altitude. While Jamestown receives less than 5 inches (13 cm) of rainfall per year, the higher parts of the island are also wetter than the city, which lies on the drier coast and in a sheltered location. The highlands above Jamestown receive up to 39 inches (99 cm) per year of precipitation and are lush with vegetation. The surrounding waters can be quite rough at times, and there is a sea wall to protect the settlement.

Climate data for Jamestown
| Month | Jan | Feb | Mar | Apr | May | Jun | Jul | Aug | Sep | Oct | Nov | Dec | Year |
|---|---|---|---|---|---|---|---|---|---|---|---|---|---|
| Record high °C (°F) | 31.7 (89.1) | 32.2 (90.0) | 33.3 (91.9) | 33.9 (93.0) | 28.3 (82.9) | 27.2 (81.0) | 26.1 (79.0) | 25.6 (78.1) | 25.6 (78.1) | 25.6 (78.1) | 26.7 (80.1) | 27.8 (82.0) | 33.9 (93.0) |
| Mean daily maximum °C (°F) | 26.7 (80.1) | 27.2 (81.0) | 27.8 (82.0) | 27.2 (81.0) | 24.4 (75.9) | 23.3 (73.9) | 22.2 (72.0) | 22.2 (72.0) | 22.2 (72.0) | 22.8 (73.0) | 23.3 (73.9) | 24.4 (75.9) | 24.5 (76.1) |
| Daily mean °C (°F) | 23.6 (74.5) | 24.2 (75.6) | 24.8 (76.6) | 24.2 (75.6) | 21.9 (71.4) | 20.8 (69.4) | 19.7 (67.5) | 19.7 (67.5) | 19.7 (67.5) | 20.3 (68.5) | 20.8 (69.4) | 21.6 (70.9) | 21.8 (71.2) |
| Mean daily minimum °C (°F) | 20.6 (69.1) | 21.1 (70.0) | 21.7 (71.1) | 21.1 (70.0) | 19.4 (66.9) | 18.3 (64.9) | 17.2 (63.0) | 17.2 (63.0) | 17.2 (63.0) | 17.8 (64.0) | 18.3 (64.9) | 18.9 (66.0) | 19.1 (66.4) |
| Record low °C (°F) | 17.2 (63.0) | 18.9 (66.0) | 18.9 (66.0) | 17.2 (63.0) | 16.1 (61.0) | 16.1 (61.0) | 14.4 (57.9) | 15.0 (59.0) | 14.4 (57.9) | 15.6 (60.1) | 16.7 (62.1) | 15.6 (60.1) | 14.4 (57.9) |
| Average precipitation mm (inches) | 8 (0.3) | 10 (0.4) | 20 (0.8) | 10 (0.4) | 18 (0.7) | 18 (0.7) | 8 (0.3) | 10 (0.4) | 5 (0.2) | 3 (0.1) | 0 (0) | 3 (0.1) | 114 (4.5) |
| Average rainy days | 4 | 4 | 5 | 3 | 4 | 6 | 8 | 3 | 2 | 0.7 | 0 | 1 | 41 |
| Average relative humidity (%) | 63 | 65 | 64 | 65 | 72 | 72 | 74 | 76 | 75 | 72 | 72 | 65 | 70 |
Source 1: Sistema de Clasificación Bioclimática Mundial
Source 2: BBC Weather, Danish Meteorological Institute (humidity 1931–1960)

== Population ==
Historical population
| Year | Pop. | ±% |
|---|---|---|
| 1861 | 3,268 | — |
| 1871 | 3,224 | −1.3% |
| 1881 | 2,435 | −24.5% |
| 1891 | 2,233 | −8.3% |
| 1901 | 7,947 | +255.9% |
| 1911 | 1,416 | −82.2% |
| 1921 | 1,438 | +1.6% |
| 1931 | 1,381 | −4.0% |
| 1946 | 1,547 | +12.0% |
| 1956 | 1,568 | +1.4% |
| 1966 | 1,475 | −5.9% |
| 1976 | 1,534 | +4.0% |
| 1987 | 1,332 | −13.2% |
| 1998 | 884 | −33.6% |
| 2008 | 716 | −19.0% |
| 2016 | 657 | −8.2% |
| 2021 | 625 | −4.9% |
Starting in 1891, garrison and shipping population included in total, starting in 1901, prisoners included. Source:

As of 2021, the district of Jamestown had 625 residents, a slight decline since the 2016 population of 657. The city's population has been shrinking and it is no longer the largest settlement on the island, having been surpassed by Half Tree Hollow, Saint Paul's and Longwood. Jamestown is the smallest city under British rule.

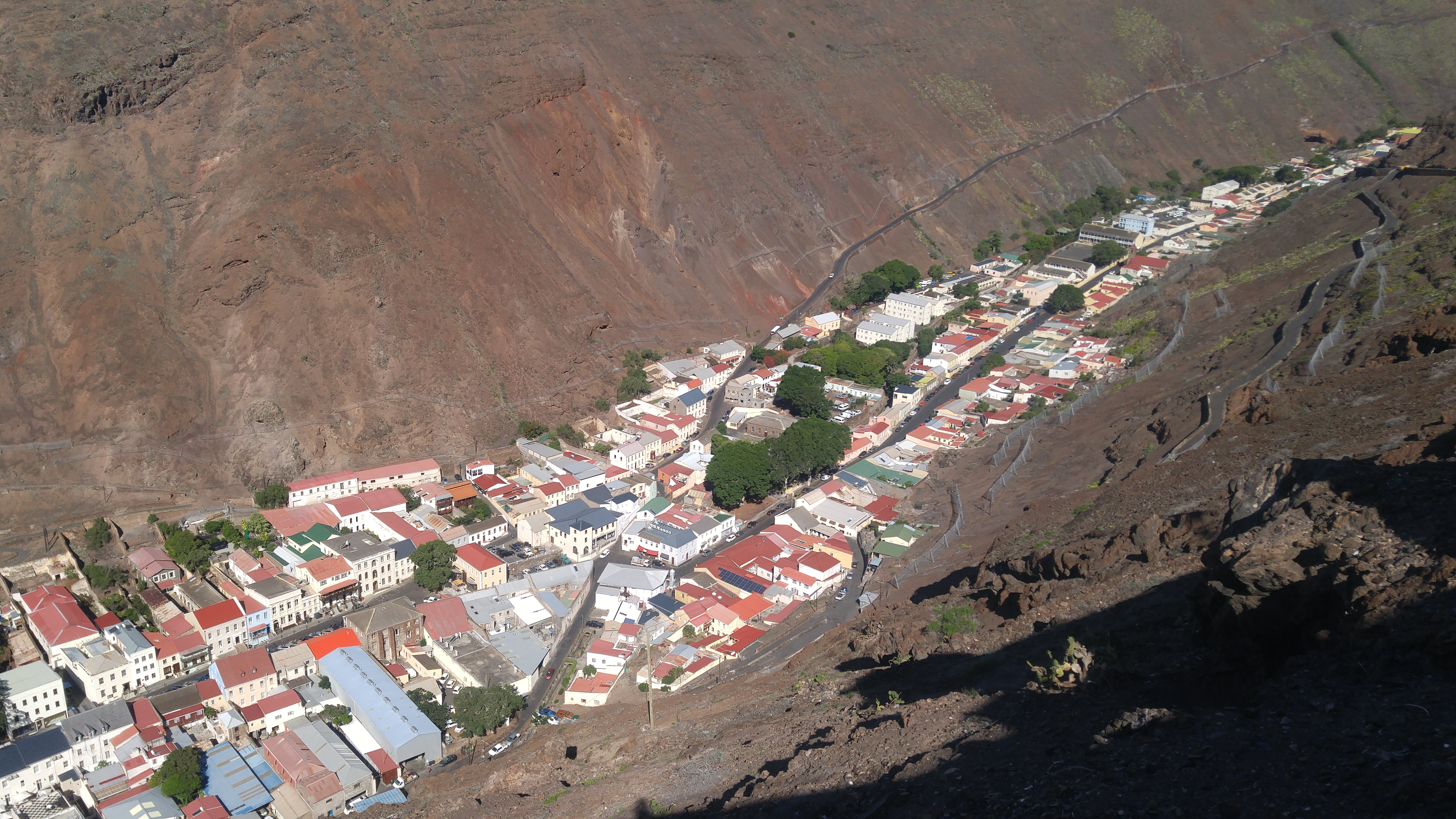
Central Jamestown from above in 2020

== Education ==
As a British territory, the island follows the British education system. There is one primary school, serving children ages four to eleven, in Jamestown, Pilling Primary School, which was created by the amalgamation of Jamestown First School and Pilling Middle School in September 2007. The island's only secondary school is St Helena Secondary School in Saint Paul's.

== Religion ==
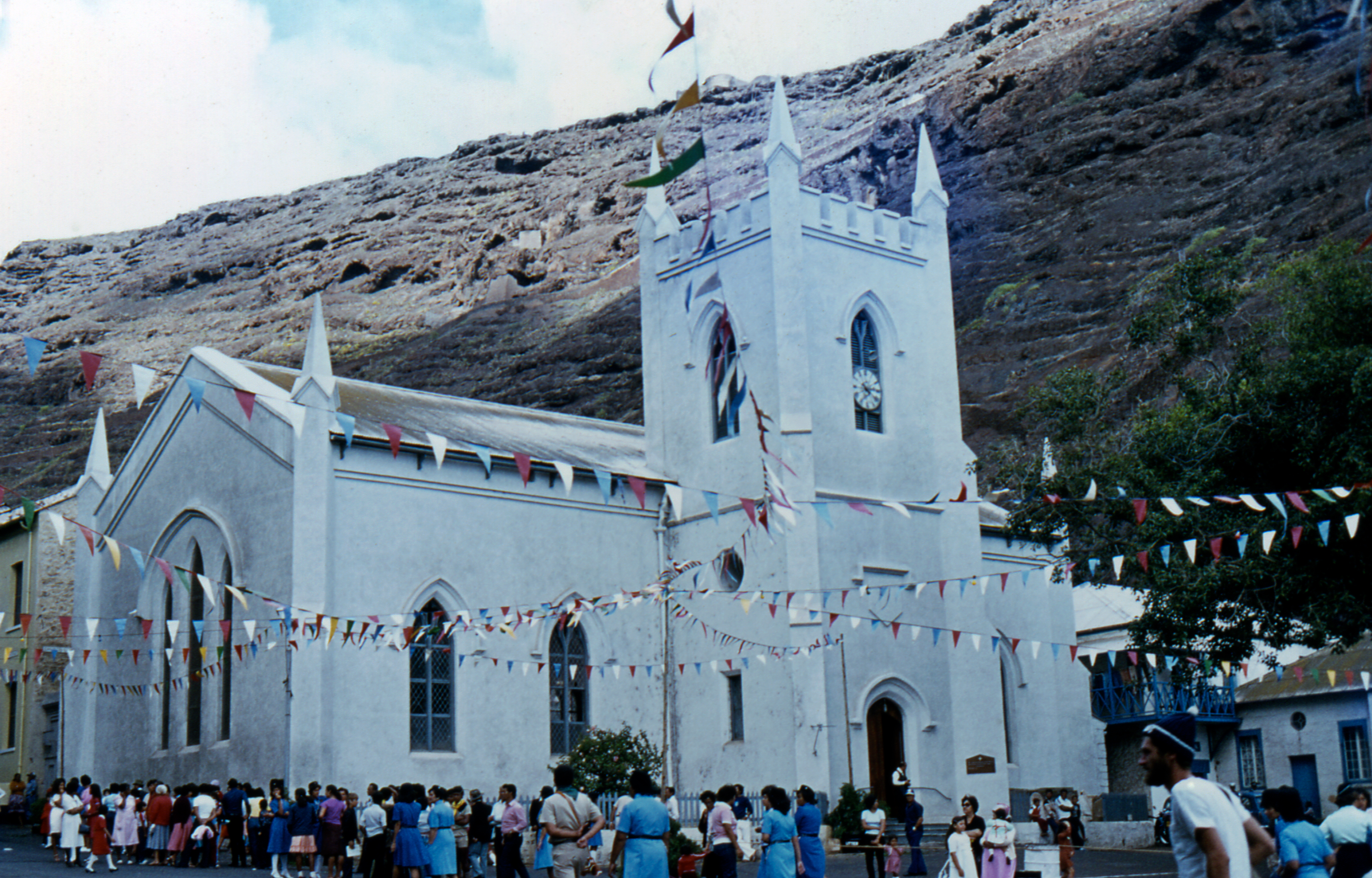
St James' Church in 1984

The Anglican Parish of St. James is one of the three parishes of the Diocese of St Helena on the island. St James' Church is the primary church in the parish and is the oldest Anglican Church in the southern hemisphere; the present building was put up in 1772. There are 3 daughter churches: St John's, in Upper Jamestown, St Mary's, the Briars, and St Michael's, in Rupert's Valley. The sole Catholic Church in St Helena, Sacred Heart Church, is located in Jamestown; as is a Baptist church.

== See also ==
- List of towns in Saint Helena, Ascension and Tristan da Cunha
