= Half Tree Hollow =

District of Saint Helena

Coordinates: 15°56′0″S 5°43′12″W

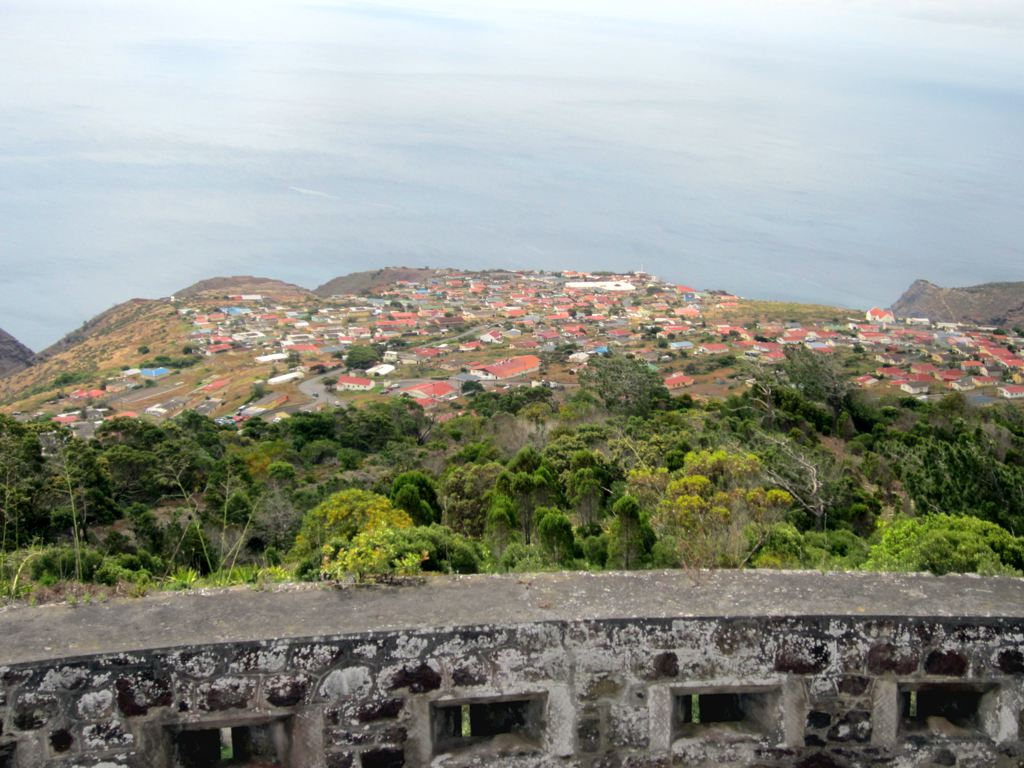

- Sovereign state: United Kingdom
- Overseas territory: Saint Helena, Ascension and Tristan da Cunha
- Island: Saint Helena
- Status: District

Area
  - Total: 0.62 sq mi (1.6 km^{2})

Population (2021)
  - Total: 1,034
  - Density: 1,590/sq mi (615/km^{2})
- Time zone: UTC+0 (GMT)

Half Tree Hollow is the smallest by area of the eight districts of the island of Saint Helena, part of the British Overseas Territory of Saint Helena, Ascension and Tristan da Cunha in the South Atlantic Ocean. It is a suburb of Jamestown and is situated at the top of Ladder Hill, which forms the southern side of the James Valley, at the base of which sits Jamestown. The hill was fortified in the late 1700s, and Ladder Hill Fort was subsequently built. The village grew during the 1960s because the James Valley lacked any room for expansion.

== Description ==
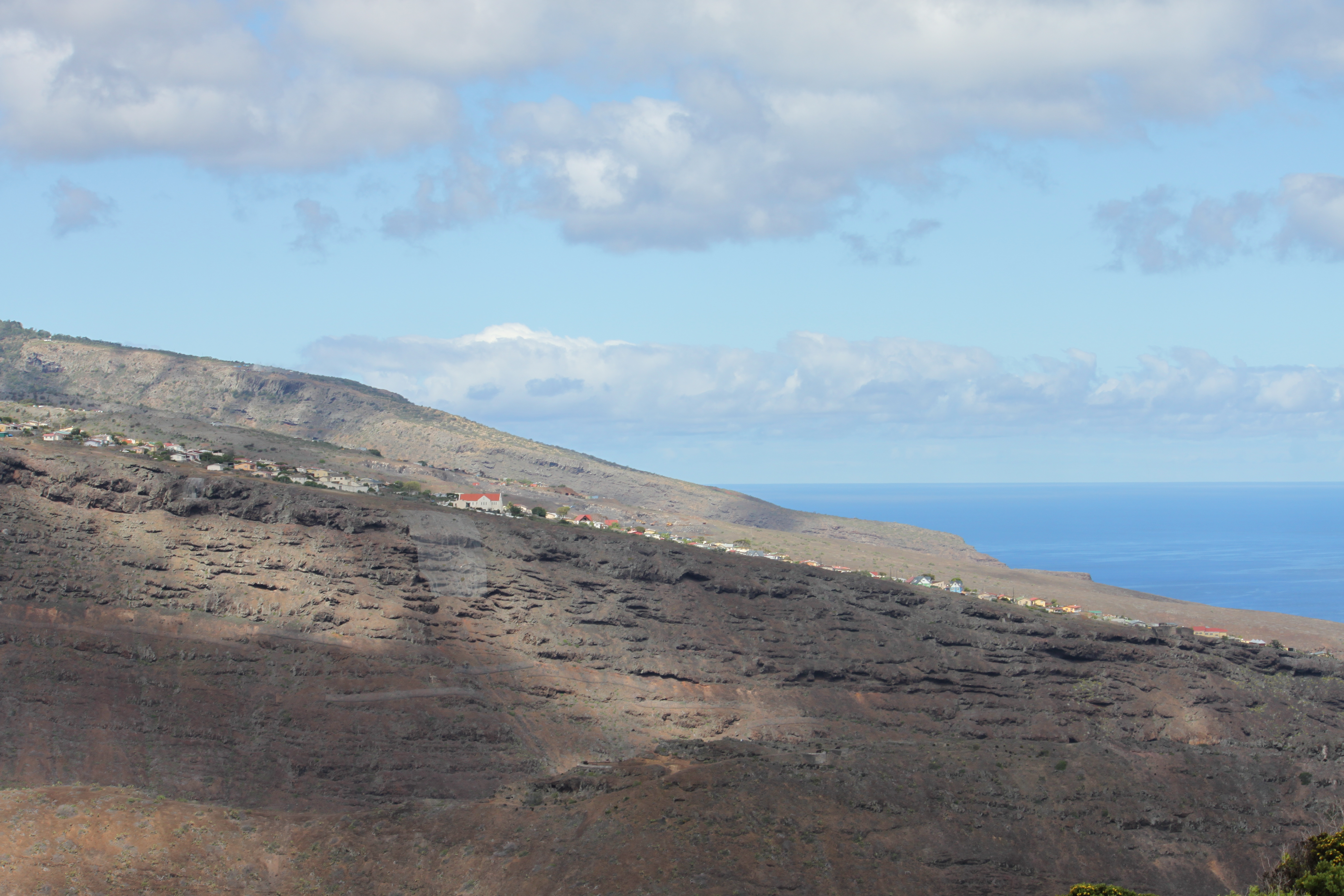
Viewed from Rupert's Hill

The district is bounded by the contours of Ladder Hill and is essentially a flat plateau.

Half Tree Hollow is the largest settlement in Saint Helena, with a population exceeding that of the territory's capital of Jamestown. Its population has fluctuated from 901 in 1998 to 1,140 in 2008 and 1,034 in 2021.

== History ==
Ladder Hill was initially known as Fort Hill, even though it was not initially fortified. It was first used by the East India Company as an execution ground with the gibbet visible from Jamestown for the moral edification of the population. The first road to Ladder Hill was completed in 1770, and construction of fortifications on the seaward side of the hill began around 1790. Additional works were built over the next several decades, and the complex was known as Ladder Hill Fort by 1815. The fort was reinforced and expanded while Napoleon was in exile in St. Helena (1815–21), and the 20th Regiment of Foot is known to have been garrisoned there in 1819. Additional barracks and officer's quarters were built during the 1820s.

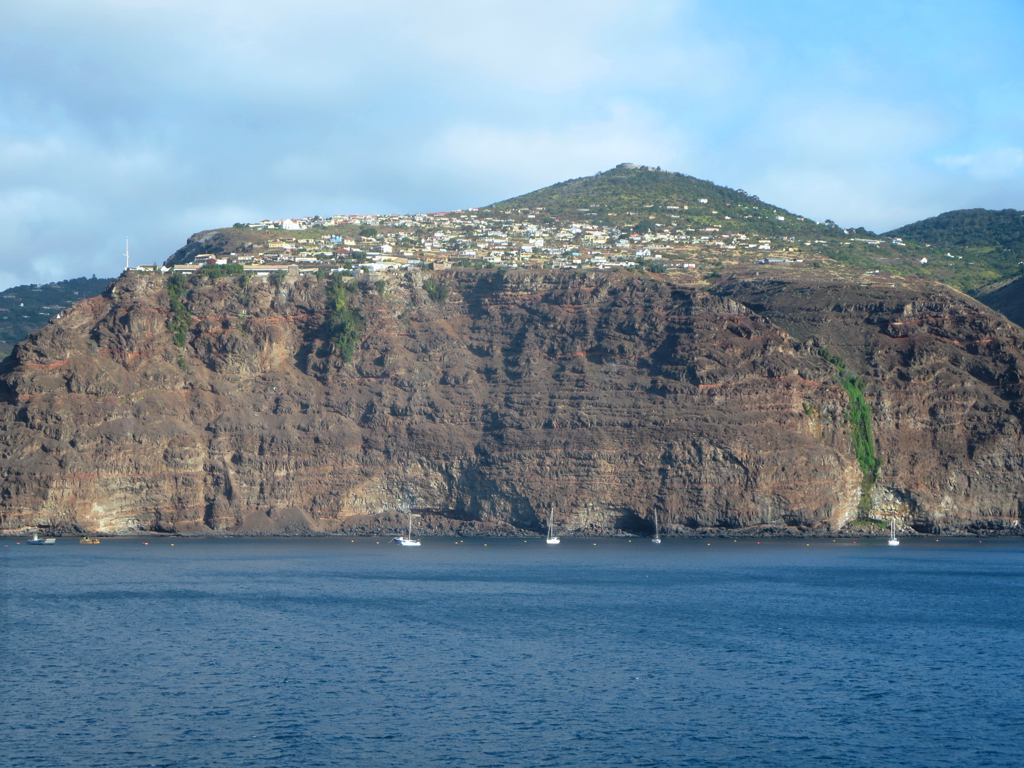
Viewed from the sea

A funicular was built to connect Jamestown and the fort in 1829. The cars and rails were removed in 1871 and it was converted into a staircase, commonly known as Jacob's Ladder.

== Bibliography ==
- Denholm, Ken. "South Atlantic Fortress" (PDF). Saint Helena Island Info. Archived from the original (PDF) on 26 November 2016.
