= Levelwood =

Coordinates: 15.975°S 5.67°W

- Levelwood in Saint Helena
- Sovereign state: United Kingdom
- British overseas territory: Saint Helena, Ascension and Tristan da Cunha
- Island: Saint Helena
- Status: District

Population (2016)
  - Total: 369 (district)
- Time zone: UTC+0 (GMT)

Levelwood is one of eight districts of the island of Saint Helena, part of the British Overseas Territory of Saint Helena, Ascension and Tristan da Cunha in the South Atlantic Ocean. In 2008 it had a population of 316, compared to a population of 376 in 1998, and is rural in nature.
