= Saint Helena, Ascension and Tristan da Cunha Philatelic Society =

The Saint Helena, Ascension and Tristan da Cunha Philatelic Society (SHATPS), founded 1976, is the only philatelic society specialising in the philately of the three Atlantic islands of St. Helena, Ascension Island and Tristan da Cunha.

The society has published a number of works containing specialised philatelic information available nowhere else, including in their long-running journal The South Atlantic Chronicle.

The society is an affiliate (No. AF0085) of the American Philatelic Society.

== Selected publications ==
- The South Atlantic Chronicle ISSN 1065–6979
- St. Helena, Ascension, and Tristan da Cunha Philatelic Society's Twentieth Anniversary Anthology, Russell V. Skavaril, 1997, ISBN 1-890454-02-8
- Thirty Years of St. Helena, Ascension and Tristan da Cunha Philately, Michael D. Mueller and Dr. Peter P. McCann, 2006, ISBN 1-890454-37-0
- The Postal History of St Helena During the Napoleonic Exile - St. Helena Boer Prisoners of War Censor and Camp Handstamps by Arthur H. Groten, Russell V. Skavaril and I.D. Lampart, 1991
- U.S. Consular Mail from St. Helena, Michael D. Mueller, 2002 ISBN 1-890454-18-4
- A Diary of the final cruise of the R.M.S. St. Helena to Tristan da Cunha January 15–28, 2004, Ted Cookson

== See also ==
- Postage stamps and postal history of Ascension Island
- Postage stamps and postal history of Saint Helena
- Postage stamps and postal history of Tristan da Cunha
