= Molearachne =

Scientific classification
- Kingdom: Animalia
- Phylum: Arthropoda
- Subphylum: Chelicerata
- Class: Arachnida
- Order: Araneae
- Infraorder: Araneomorphae
- Family: Lycosidae
- Genus: Molearachne; Sherwood, Henrard, Logunov & Fowler, 2023
- Species: M. sanctaehelenae

Binomial name
- Molearachne sanctaehelenae Sherwood, Henrard, Logunov & Fowler, 2023

Species of spider

Molearachne is a monotypic genus of spiders in the family Lycosidae containing the single species, Molearachne sanctaehelenae.

== Distribution ==
Molearachne sanctaehelenae is endemic to St. Helena, where it has been found in Prosperous Bay Plain and Bradleys.

== Lifestyle ==
This species constructs mounds out of dry earth, and may interconnect several of these using web tunnels. They spend the night under one of these mounds.

== Etymology ==
The genus name is a combination of mole and Ancient Greek ἀράχνη ("spider"), referring to both moles and these spiders creating earth mounds.
