= Postage stamps and postal history of Ascension Island =

Ascension Island is an island in the South Atlantic Ocean, part of the wider British overseas territory of Saint Helena, Ascension and Tristan da Cunha. Like other British Overseas Territories, it issues its own postage stamps, which provide a source of income for the island from sales to overseas collectors, as well as being used for domestic and international postage.

== Early days ==
Originally mail was carried on an irregular basis as ships called. A datestamp was in use from February 1858, and in 1863 the Union Steamship Co. began regular carriage of mail, continuing until 1977. On 3 March 1867 British postage stamps became valid for Ascension mail and continued in use until 1922, when Ascension became a dependency of Saint Helena.

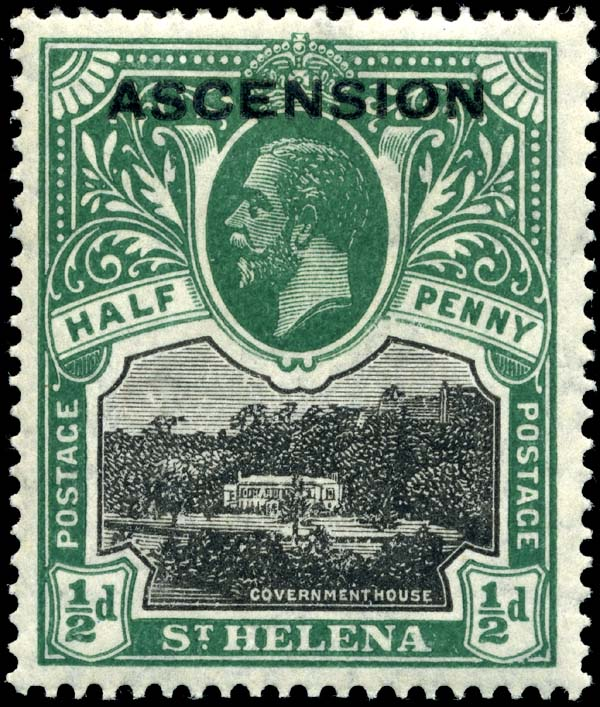
The first Ascension stamps were overprinted stamps of Saint Helena.

== First stamps ==
On 2 November 1922, nine stamps of St. Helena overprinted "ASCENSION" replaced British stamps. These were followed up in 1924 by a series of 12 using the St. Helena design but inscribed for Ascension. In 1934 a pictorial series of ten engraved stamps depicted various views of the island.

== George VI ==
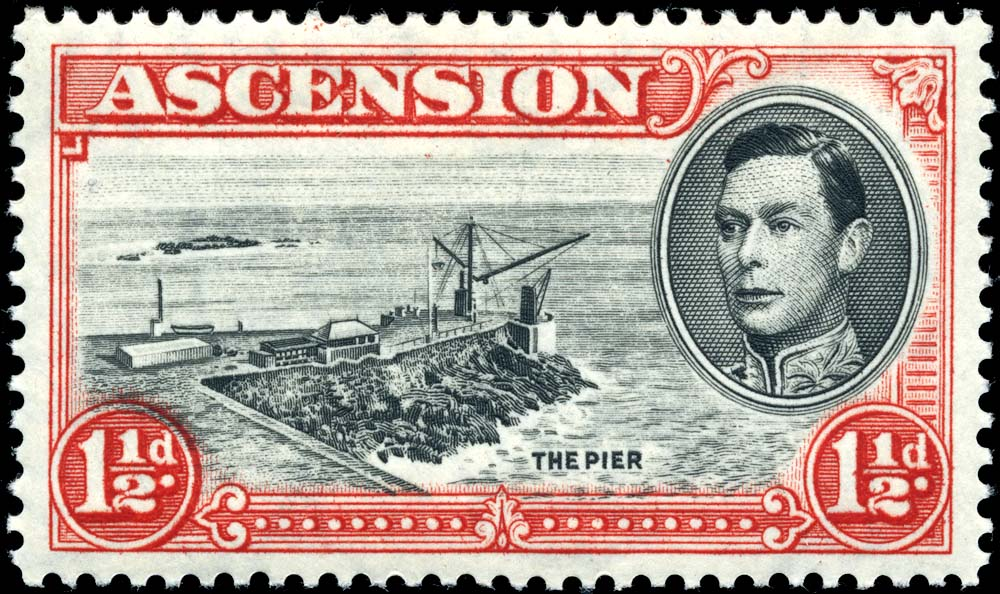
A 1938 stamp showing a view of "The Pier"

In 1938 the pictorials were re-issued with a portrait of George VI replacing his father's image. Various colour and perforation changes ensued, with the last being issued in February 1953.

== Queen Elizabeth ==
A new definitive series of 13 in 1956 resembled the previous stamps, but was a little taller, and used maps and pictures of native animals in addition to local scenes. No further stamps were issued until 1963 when there was a series of 14 featuring birds.

From 1963 on, commemorative and special issues started to appear more frequently. In the 1990s the typical policy was to issue 5–6 sets per year, each consisting of 4–5 designs.

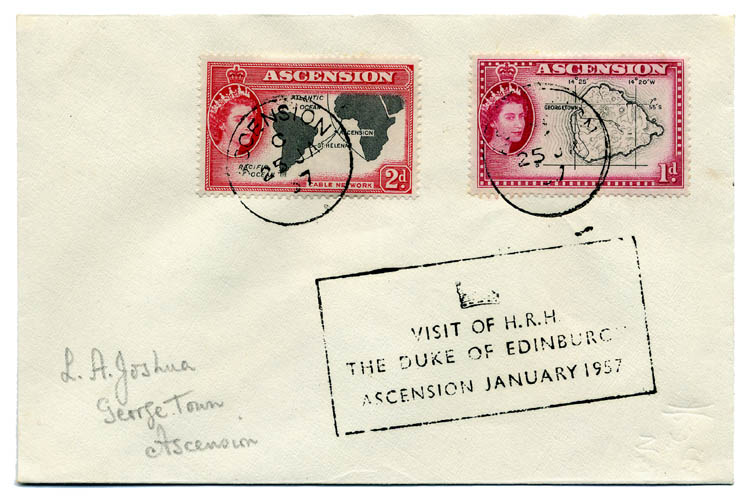
A cover mailed during the visit by the Duke of Edinburgh in 1957

== See also ==
- Postage stamps and postal history of Saint Helena
- Postage stamps and postal history of Tristan da Cunha

== Sources ==
- Stanley Gibbons Ltd: various catalogues
- Encyclopaedia of Postal History
- Rossiter, Stuart & John Flower. The Stamp Atlas. London: Macdonald, 1986. ISBN 0-356-10862-7
