= North-east Saint Helena Important Bird Area =

Coordinates: 15°57′S 05°40′W

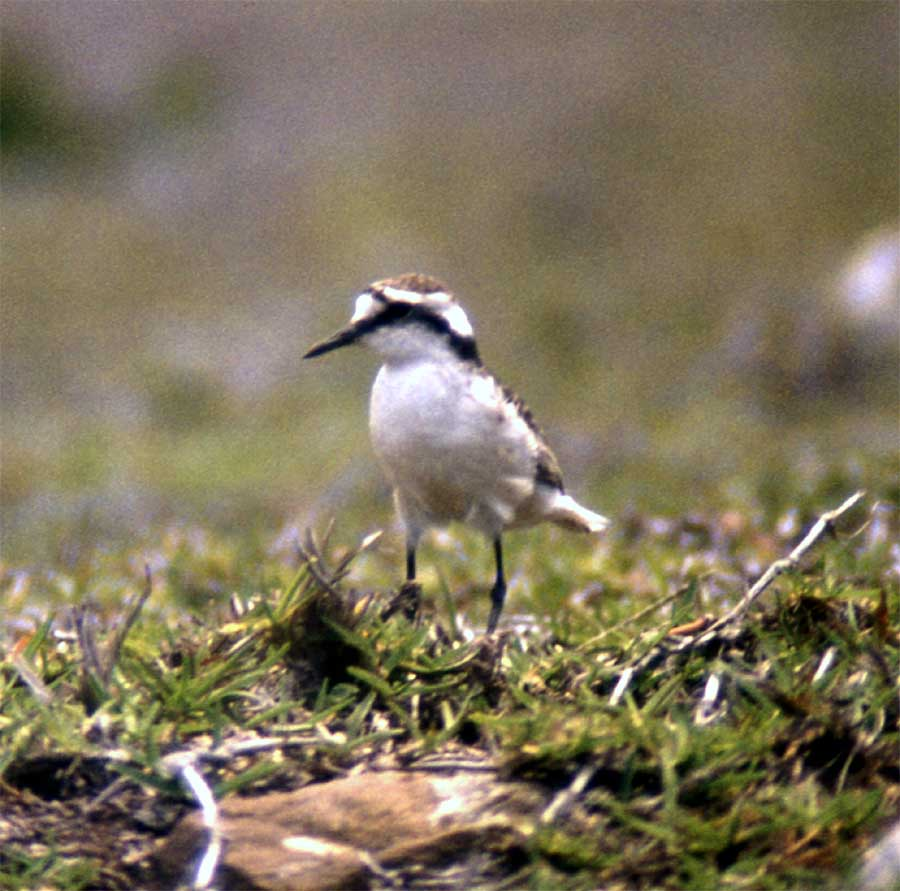
The site is important for Saint Helena plovers

The North-east Saint Helena Important Bird Area is a 48 km^{2} tract of land covering about 39% of the island of Saint Helena, a British Overseas Territory in the South Atlantic Ocean. It has been identified by BirdLife International as an Important Bird Area (IBA) because it supports several colonies of breeding seabirds, including the red-billed tropicbird, as well as much of the remaining habitat of the endemic, and critically endangered, Saint Helena plover.

== Description ==
The site covers north-eastern Saint Helena, from the eastern end of Diana's Peak National Park to the basaltic stacks of Shore Island, George Island and other offshore rocks which support the seabird colonies. The three vegetation zones comprise an arid, eroded lowland below 350 m, an intermediate zone at 350–500 m of pasture and non-indigenous woodland, and a moist highland zone characterised by woodland and flax plantations. The coast is dominated by sea cliffs rising mainly to between 300 and 570 m. The islets are bare with heavy guano deposits.

Localities within the site include eight Saint Helena plover breeding sites – Bottomwoods, Deadwood Plain, Horse Point Plain, Longwood Farm, Sane Valley, Prosperous Bay North, Prosperous Bay Plain and Upper Prosperous Bay. Horse Point Plain is the only place from which live specimens of the critically endangered, possibly extinct, invertebrates Labidura herculeana and Aplothorax burchelli have been recorded. There are also important fossil sites at Dry Gut, Flagstaff Hill, Prosperous Bay and Sugarloaf.

== See also ==
- South-west Saint Helena Important Bird Area
