= South-west Saint Helena Important Bird Area =

Important Bird Area on the island of Saint Helena

Coordinates: 15°59′S 05°45′W

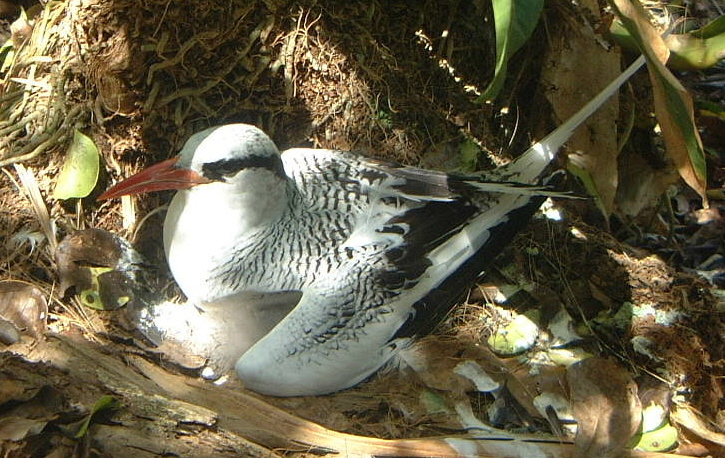
The site is important for red-billed tropicbirds

The South-west Saint Helena Important Bird Area is a 45 km^{2} tract of land covering about 37% of the island of Saint Helena, a British Overseas Territory in the South Atlantic Ocean. It has been identified by BirdLife International as an Important Bird Area (IBA) because it supports several colonies of breeding seabirds, including the red-billed tropicbird, as well as habitat of the endemic, and critically endangered, Saint Helena plover.

== Description ==
The site covers south-western Saint Helena, from Diana's Peak National Park to the mainly basaltic islets of Egg, Speery and Peaked Islands and other offshore stacks and rocks which support the seabird colonies. The four vegetation zones comprise an arid, eroded lowland below 350 m, an intermediate zone at 350–500 m of pasture and non-indigenous woodland, a moist highland zone characterised by woodland and flax plantations and, at the highest point of the island, a small remnant area of native Dicksonia fern thicket and Melanodendron cabbage trees. . The coast is dominated by sea cliffs rising mainly to between 300–570 m. The islets are largely bare with some lichens and heavy guano deposits. There is an important fossil site at Sandy Bay.

=== Birds ===
Localities within the site include three Saint Helena plover breeding sites – Broad Bottom, Southern Pastures, and Man and Horse. Apart from red-billed tropicbirds, breeding seabirds include band-rumped storm petrels, Atlantic masked boobies, Atlantic sooty terns, brown and black noddies, white terns and, possibly, brown boobies.

== See also ==
- North-east Saint Helena Important Bird Area
