= Postage stamps and postal history of Tristan da Cunha =

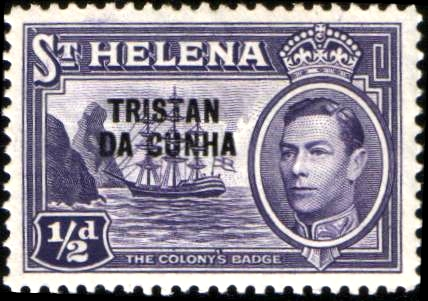
A 1952 stamp of Saint Helena overprinted for use in Tristan da Cunha from 1952

This is a survey of the postage stamps and postal history of Tristan da Cunha.

== Local stamps ==
In 1946, labels showing penguins and the currency being potatoes were issued. The 4 potatoes red stamp was included in the miniature sheet issued in 1979 to commemorate the death centenary of Sir Rowland Hill.

== First stamp ==
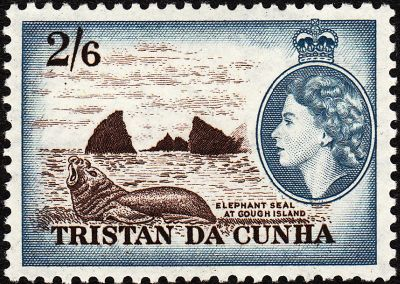
1954 Tristan da Cunha stamp depicting elephant seal at Gough Island

The first stamps of Tristan da Cunha were issued on 1 January 1952 and consisted of twelve stamps of Saint Helena overprinted TRISTAN DA CUNHA. In 1954 a definitive set depicted various themes of the islands.

== See also ==
- Postage stamps and postal history of Ascension Island
- Postage stamps and postal history of Saint Helena
