= Postage stamps and postal history of Saint Helena =

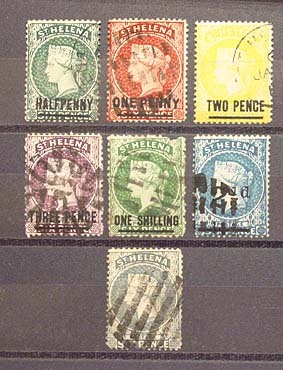
A selection of early stamps from St Helena

This is a survey of the postage stamps and postal history of Saint Helena.

== Queen Victoria and King Edward VII (1856–1908) ==
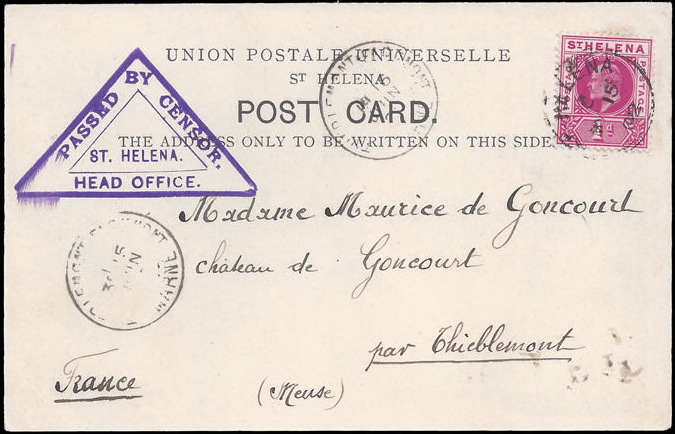
Censored postcard to France with St Helena postal censor head office PASSED BY CENSOR handstamp and 1902 King Edward VII key type 1d stamp

The first stamp of St Helena was issued on 1 January 1856. It was a 6d blue imperforate stamp portraying Queen Victoria. From 1863 to 1880, this stamp was issued in various colours, perforated and overprinted for each value from 1d to 5s. This design continued to be used until 1884, when a new set of Victorian key types was issued for the colony.

The Victorian key types were replaced by a short-lived set of two King Edward VII key types in 1902. In 1903, a new pictorial definitive set of six values was issued. Three stamps showed King Edward and the Government House, and three others showed the King and the Wharf. In 1908, a set of four key types was issued. The values were additional values which were not included in the 1903 pictorial definitive (2½d, 4d, 6d and 10s).

== King George V and King George VI (1912–1949) ==
The 1912–1916 King George V definitives were similar to the 1903 definitive, the only difference being the King's profile. However this time there were ten values in the set, ranging from ½d to 3s. Between 1912 and 1913 4d and 6d stamps (not included in the pictorial set) were issued in the form of a key type.

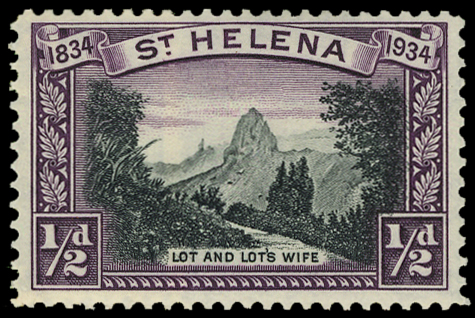
Lot and Lot's wife stamp issued in 1934

Between 1922 and 1937, a new definitive was issued. Designed by the St Helena-born Postmaster Thomas R. Bruce, it was similar to the 1912–1916 pictorials, but instead of the Government House or the Wharf, these stamps showed the badge of St. Helena – a three-masted sailing ship near two large rocks. These values ranged from ½d to £1, and there are many varieties, such as the broken mainmast, the torn flag, and the cleft rock. In 1934, St. Helena's first commemorative set was issued. This was a set of 10 values up to 10s commemorating the centenary of British colonisation (1834–1934). In 1935, the Crown Agents omnibus issue commemorating the Silver Jubilee of King George V was issued.

The first King George VI set was that of the 1937 Coronation. Between 1938 and 1949, a new definitive was issued portraying King George VI and the badge of the Colony. However, the design was totally different from the 1922 badge set. All the commemorative sets issued in this reign were CA omnibus issues:

- Coronation of King George VI (19 May 1937)
- Victory (21 October 1946)
- Royal Silver Wedding (20 October 1948)
- 75th Anniversary of the UPU (10 October 1949)

== Queen Elizabeth II (1953–2022) ==
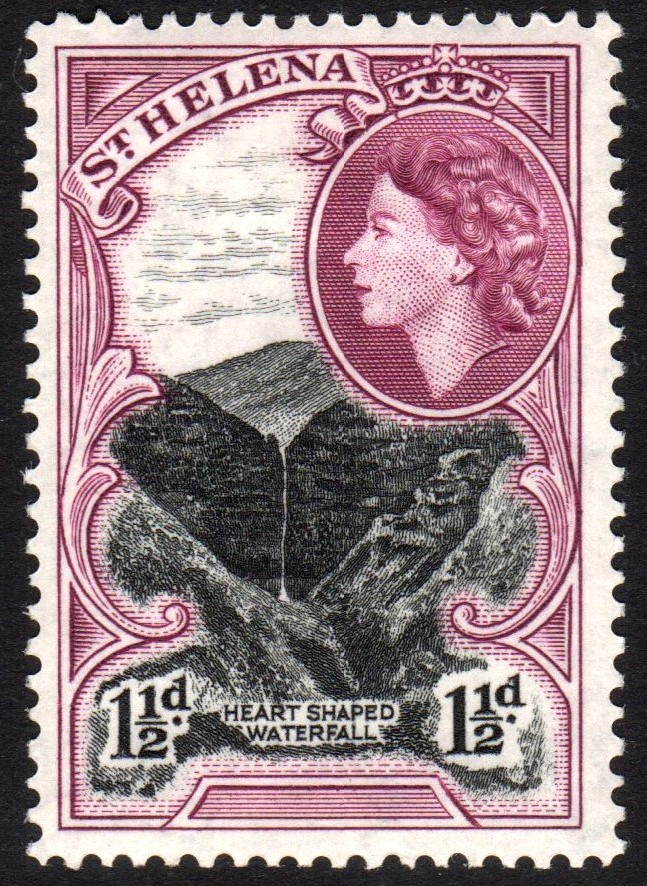
1953 Heart-shaped waterfall stamp

The first Queen Elizabeth issue was for the 1953 Coronation, followed by a pictorial definitive issued 1 month later. Issues were mainly commemorative or omnibus. On 12 October 1961, four Tristan da Cunha stamps were overprinted "ST. HELENA/Tristan Relief" with a surcharge. Only 454 sets were sold, mainly to tourists from a visiting cruise liner. This set was withdrawn on 19 October and is the most expensive set of St. Helena. St. Helena issues commemorative stamps regularly and still takes part in Crown Agents omnibus issues.

== See also ==
- Postage stamps and postal history of Ascension Island
- Postage stamps and postal history of Tristan da Cunha
