= Outline of Saint Helena =

Overview of and topical guide to Saint Helena

The Flag of Saint Helena

The Coat of arms of Saint Helena

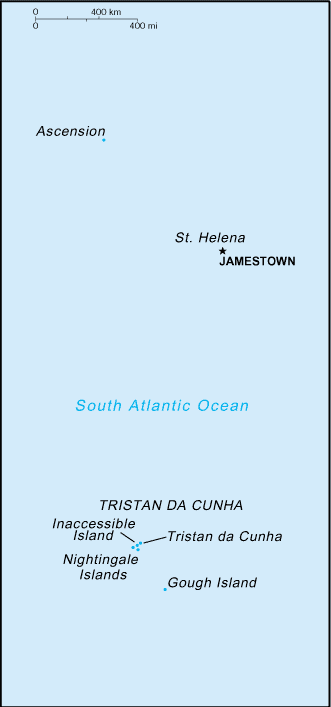
An enlargeable map of the British Overseas Territory of Saint Helena

The following outline is provided as an overview of and topical guide to Saint Helena:

Saint Helena, named after St Helena of Constantinople, is an island of volcanic origin in the South Atlantic Ocean. It is part of the British overseas territory of Saint Helena, Ascension and Tristan da Cunha which also includes Ascension Island and the islands of Tristan da Cunha. Saint Helena measures about 16 by 8 kilometres (10 by 5 mi) and has a population of 4,255 (2008 census).

== General reference ==
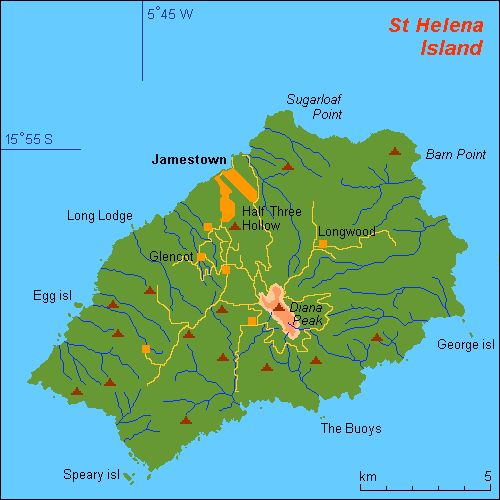
An enlargeable map of the island of Saint Helena

- ISO country codes: SH, SHN, 654
- ISO region codes: See ISO 3166-2:SH
- Internet country code top-level domain: .sh

== Geography of Saint Helena ==
Geography of Saint Helena

- Saint Helena is: an island and part of the British overseas territory of Saint Helena, Ascension and Tristan da Cunha
- Location:
  - Southern Hemisphere and Western Hemisphere
  - Atlantic Ocean
    - South Atlantic
  - Time zone: Greenwich Mean Time (UTC+00)
  - Extreme points of Saint Helena
    - High: Queen Mary's Peak on Tristan da Cunha 2,060 m (6,759 ft) – highest peak in South Atlantic Ocean
      Green Mountain on Ascension Island 859 m (2,818 ft)
      Diana's Peak on Saint Helena 818 m (2,684 ft)
    - Low: South Atlantic Ocean 0 m
  - Land boundaries: none
  - Coastline: South Atlantic Ocean
- Population of Saint Helena: 6,600 - 215th most populous country
- Area of Saint Helena: 420 km^{2}
- Atlas of Saint Helena

=== Environment of Saint Helena ===
- Climate of Saint Helena
- Wildlife of Saint Helena
  - Flora of Saint Helena
  - Fauna of Saint Helena
    - Birds of Saint Helena
    - Mammals of Saint Helena
    - Insects of Saint Helena
      - Saint Helena earwig

=== Regions of Saint Helena ===
==== Administrative divisions of Saint Helena ====
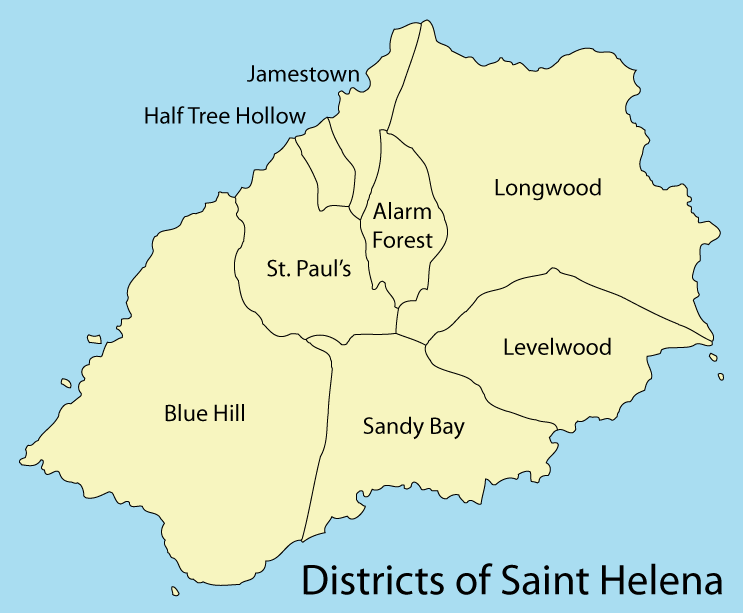

- Districts
  - Alarm Forest
  - Blue Hill
  - Half Tree Hollow
  - Jamestown
  - Levelwood
  - Longwood — district where Napoleon was exiled from 1815 until his death on 5 May 1821.
    - France owns the land around Napoleon's original grave, but the United Kingdom retains full sovereignty.
  - St. Paul's
  - Sandy Bay
- Municipalities (cities, towns, etc.)
  - Towns in Saint Helena
    - Jamestown — Capital of Saint Helena

=== Demography of Saint Helena ===
Demographics of Saint Helena

== Government and politics of Saint Helena ==
Politics of Saint Helena

- Form of government: parliamentary representative democratic dependency
- Capital of Saint Helena: Jamestown
- Elections in Saint Helena
- Political parties in Saint Helena

=== Branches of the government of Saint Helena ===
==== Executive branch of the government of Saint Helena ====
- Head of state: Monarch of the United Kingdom, King Charles III
  - Monarch's representative: Governor of Saint Helena, Nigel Phillips
- Head of government: Governor of Saint Helena
- Cabinet: Executive Council of Saint Helena

==== Legislative branch of the government of Saint Helena ====
- Legislative Council of Saint Helena (unicameral)

==== Judicial branch of the government of Saint Helena ====
Court system of Saint Helena

- Supreme Court of Saint Helena

=== Foreign relations of Saint Helena ===
- Diplomatic missions of Saint Helena

==== International organization membership of Saint Helena ====
Saint Helena is a member of:

- Universal Postal Union (UPU)
- World Federation of Trade Unions (WFTU)

=== Law and order in Saint Helena ===
- Human rights in Saint Helena
  - LGBT rights in Saint Helena
- Law enforcement in Saint Helena
  - Saint Helena Police Service

=== Military of Saint Helena ===
- Commander-in-Chief: Governor of Saint Helena

== History of Saint Helena ==
History of Saint Helena

== Culture of Saint Helena ==
- Architecture of Saint Helena
  - Briars
  - Longwood House
- Cuisine of Saint Helena
- National symbols of Saint Helena
  - Coat of arms of Saint Helena
  - Flag of Saint Helena
  - Unofficial territorial anthem: My Saint Helena Island
- Public holidays in Saint Helena, Ascension and Tristan da Cunha
- Religion in Saint Helena
  - Christianity in Saint Helena
    - Diocese of St Helena
    - Roman Catholicism in Saint Helena
- Scouting and Guiding on Saint Helena and Ascension Island
- Sport in Saint Helena
  - Saint Helena, Ascension and Tristan da Cunha at the 2010 Commonwealth Games
  - Saint Helena national cricket team
- World Heritage Sites in Saint Helena: None

== Economy and infrastructure of Saint Helena ==
Economy of Saint Helena

- Economic rank, by nominal GDP (2007):
- Communications in Saint Helena
  - Radio Saint Helena
- Currency: — Saint Helena has its own currency
  - Saint Helena pound
  - Coins of the Saint Helena pound — Saint Helena mints its own coins
  - ISO 4217: SHP
- Transport on Saint Helena
  - Airports in Saint Helena
    - Saint Helena Airport
  - Rail transport in Saint Helena

== Education in Saint Helena ==
- Education in Saint Helena

== See also ==
- Outline of geography
  - Outline of the United Kingdom
  - Outline of Africa
    - Outline of Ascension Island
    - Outline of Tristan da Cunha
- List of international rankings
