= Outline of Tristan da Cunha =

Overview of and topical guide to Tristan da Cunha

Flag of Tristan da Cunha

Coat of arms of Tristan da Cunha

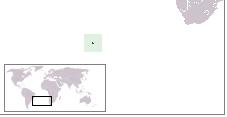
The location of Tristan da Cunha

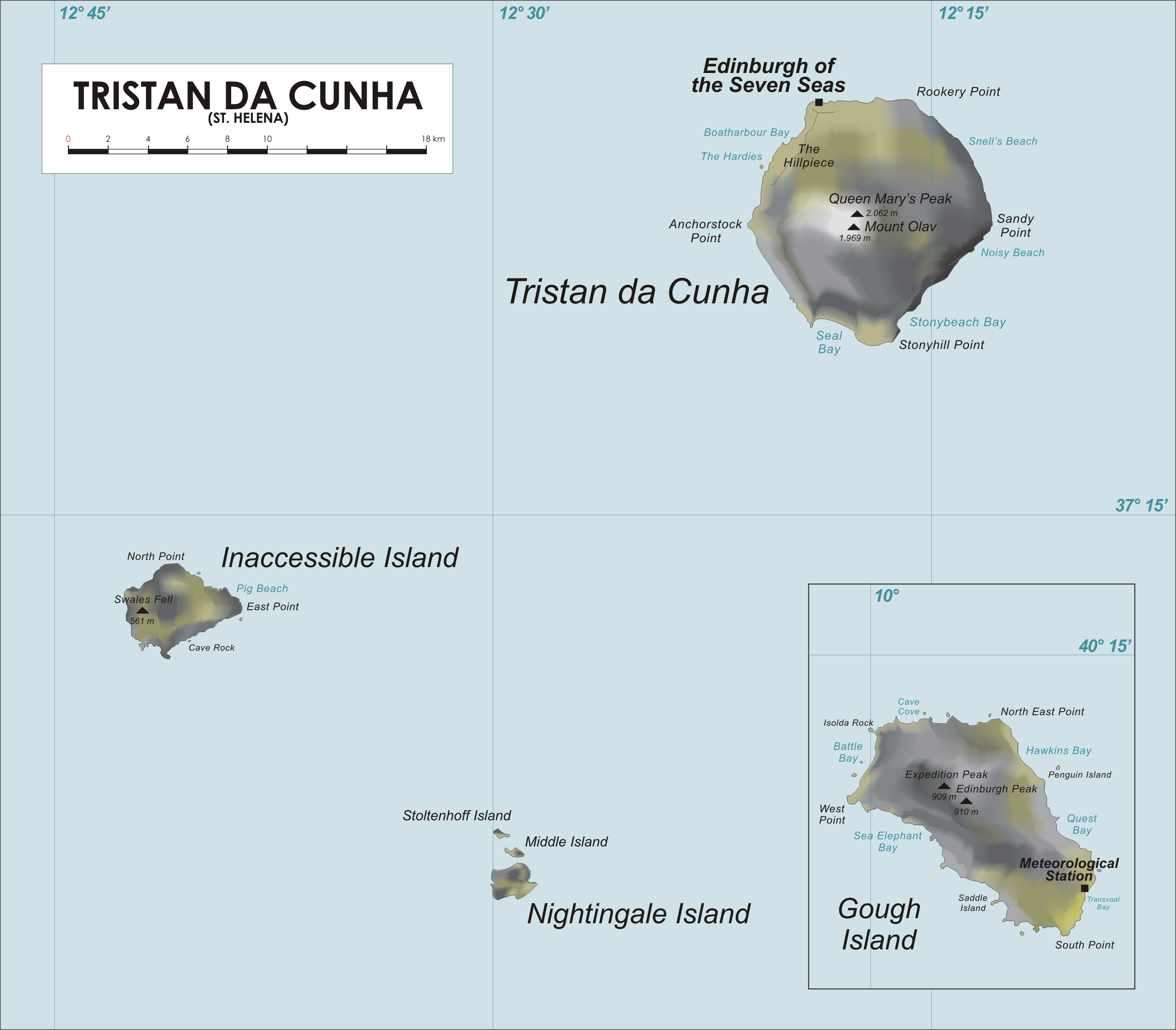
An enlargeable (click!) relief map of Tristan da Cunha

The following outline is provided as an overview of and topical guide to Tristan da Cunha:

Tristan da Cunha – group of remote volcanic islands in the south Atlantic Ocean, 2,816 km (1,750 mi) from South Africa and 3,360 km (2,090 mi) from South America. It is part of the British Overseas Territory of St Helena, Ascension and Tristan da Cunha; Saint Helena itself is 2,430 km (1,510 mi) to the north. The territory consists of the main island, Tristan da Cunha (area: 98 km^{2}, 38 sq mi), as well as several uninhabited islands: Inaccessible Island and the Nightingale Islands. Gough Island (area: 91 km^{2}, 35 sq mi), situated 395 km (245 mi) south east of the main island, is also considered part of the territory. Tristan da Cunha is the most remote archipelago in the world.

== General reference ==
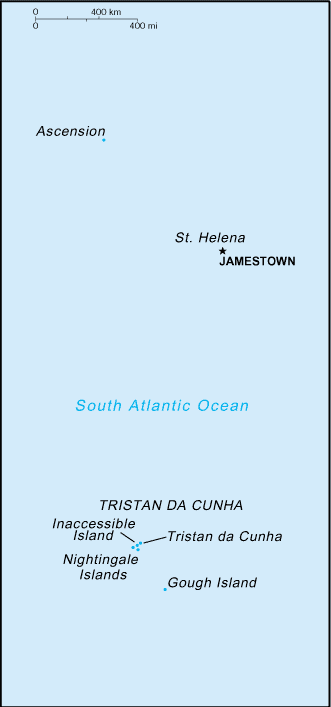
A map of the British Overseas Territory of St Helena, Ascension and Tristan da Cunha

- Pronunciation: /ˈtrɪstən də ˈkuːnjə/
- Common English country name: Tristan da Cunha
- Official English country name: Tristan da Cunha
- Common endonym(s):
- Official endonym(s):
- Adjectival(s): Tristonian
- Demonym(s): Tristonian
- Etymology: Name of Tristan da Cunha: from the Portuguese explorer Tristão da Cunha
- ISO region code: SH-TA
- Internet country code top-level domain: none (.uk or .sh can be used)

== Geography of Tristan da Cunha ==
Geography of Tristan da Cunha

- Tristan da Cunha is: an island and (together with other islands) part of the British overseas territory of Saint Helena, Ascension and Tristan da Cunha
- Location:
  - Southern Hemisphere and Western Hemisphere
  - Atlantic Ocean
    - South Atlantic
  - Time zone: Greenwich Mean Time (UTC+00)
  - Extreme points of Tristan da Cunha
    - High: Queen Mary's Peak 2,060 m (6,759 ft) – highest peak in South Atlantic Ocean
    - Low: South Atlantic Ocean 0 m
  - Land boundaries: none
  - Coastline: South Atlantic Ocean 40 km
- Population of Tristan da Cunha: 297 (2014 census)
- Area of Tristan da Cunha:

Total: 207 km^{2} (80 sq mi) Main island: 98 km^{2}

- Atlas of Tristan da Cunha

=== Environment of Tristan da Cunha ===
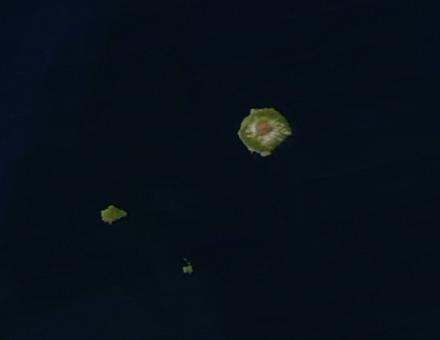
A satellite image of Tristan da Cunha

- Climate of Tristan da Cunha
- Renewable energy in Tristan da Cunha
- Geology of Tristan da Cunha
- Protected areas of Tristan da Cunha
  - Biosphere reserves in Tristan da Cunha
  - National parks of Tristan da Cunha
- Wildlife of Tristan da Cunha
  - Fauna of Tristan da Cunha
    - Birds of Tristan da Cunha
    - Mammals of Tristan da Cunha

==== Natural geographic features of Tristan da Cunha ====
- Fjords of Tristan da Cunha
- Islands of Tristan da Cunha
- Lakes of Tristan da Cunha
- Mountains of Tristan da Cunha
  - Volcanoes in Tristan da Cunha
- Rivers of Tristan da Cunha
  - Waterfalls of Tristan da Cunha
- Valleys of Tristan da Cunha
- World Heritage Sites in Tristan da Cunha: None

=== Regions of Tristan da Cunha ===
Regions of Tristan da Cunha

==== Ecoregions of Tristan da Cunha ====
List of ecoregions in Tristan da Cunha

- Ecoregions in Tristan da Cunha

=== Demography of Tristan da Cunha ===
Demographics of Tristan da Cunha

== Government and politics of Tristan da Cunha ==
Politics of Tristan da Cunha

- Form of government:
- Capital of Tristan da Cunha: Edinburgh of the Seven Seas
- Elections in Tristan da Cunha
- Political parties in Tristan da Cunha

=== Branches of government ===
Government of Ascension Island

==== Executive branch ====
- Head of state: British monarch
- Head of government: Governor of Saint Helena, Ascension and Tristan da Cunha
  - Administrator of Tristan da Cunha

==== Legislative branch ====
- Island Council

==== Judicial branch ====
Court system of Saint Helena

- Saint Helena Supreme Court

=== Foreign relations of Tristan da Cunha ===
Foreign relations of Tristan da Cunha

- Diplomatic missions in Tristan da Cunha

==== International organization membership ====
- none

=== Law and order in Tristan da Cunha ===
Law of Tristan da Cunha

- Constitution of Tristan da Cunha
- Crime in Tristan da Cunha
- Human rights in Tristan da Cunha
  - LGBT rights in Tristan da Cunha
  - Freedom of religion in Tristan da Cunha
- Law enforcement in Tristan da Cunha

=== Military of Tristan da Cunha ===
- Commander-in-Chief: Governor of Saint Helena, Ascension and Tristan da Cunha

=== Local government in Tristan da Cunha ===
Local government in Tristan da Cunha

== History of Tristan da Cunha ==
History of Tristan da Cunha

- Timeline of the history of Tristan da Cunha
- Current events of Tristan da Cunha
- Military history of Tristan da Cunha

== Culture of Tristan da Cunha ==
Culture of Tristan da Cunha

- Architecture of Tristan da Cunha
- Cuisine of Tristan da Cunha
- Festivals in Tristan da Cunha
- Languages of Tristan da Cunha
- Media in Tristan da Cunha
- National symbols of Tristan da Cunha
  - Coat of arms of Tristan da Cunha
  - Flag of Tristan da Cunha
  - National anthem of Tristan da Cunha
- People of Tristan da Cunha
- Public holidays in Tristan da Cunha
- Records of Tristan da Cunha
- Religion in Tristan da Cunha
  - Christianity in Tristan da Cunha
  - Hinduism in Tristan da Cunha
  - Islam in Tristan da Cunha
  - Judaism in Tristan da Cunha
  - Sikhism in Tristan da Cunha
- World Heritage Sites in Tristan da Cunha: None

=== Art in Tristan da Cunha ===
- Art in Tristan da Cunha
- Cinema of Tristan da Cunha
- Literature of Tristan da Cunha
- Music of Tristan da Cunha
- Television in Tristan da Cunha
- Theatre in Tristan da Cunha

=== Sports in Tristan da Cunha ===
Sports in Tristan da Cunha

- Football in Tristan da Cunha
- Tristan da Cunha at the Olympics

== Economy and infrastructure of Tristan da Cunha ==
Economy of Tristan da Cunha

- Economic rank, by nominal GDP (2007):
- Agriculture in Tristan da Cunha
- Banking in Tristan da Cunha
  - National Bank of Tristan da Cunha
- Communications in Tristan da Cunha
  - Internet in Tristan da Cunha
- Companies of Tristan da Cunha
- Currency of Tristan da Cunha: Pound sterling
  - ISO 4217: GBP
- Energy in Tristan da Cunha
  - Energy policy of Tristan da Cunha
  - Oil industry in Tristan da Cunha
- Health care in Tristan da Cunha
- Mining in Tristan da Cunha
- Tristan da Cunha Stock Exchange
- Tourism in Tristan da Cunha
- Transport in Tristan da Cunha
  - Airports in Tristan da Cunha
  - Rail transport in Tristan da Cunha
  - Roads in Tristan da Cunha
- Water supply and sanitation in Tristan da Cunha

== Education in Tristan da Cunha ==
Education in Tristan da Cunha

== See also ==
Tristan da Cunha

- Index of Tristan da Cunha-related articles
- List of international rankings
- List of Tristan da Cunha-related topics
- Outline of Africa
- Outline of geography
- Outline of Saint Helena
- Outline of the United Kingdom
