= St Helena Magistrates' Court =

Magistrates' Court in Jamestown, Saint Helena

St. Helena Magistrates' Court
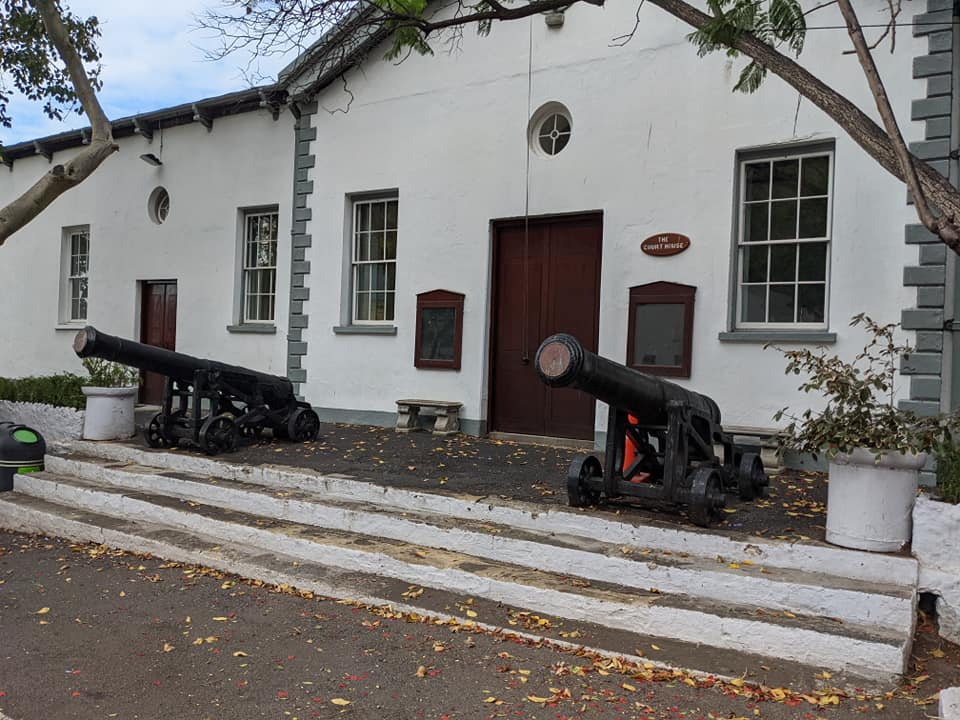
- St Helena Courthouse in 2021
- Interactive map of St. Helena Magistrates' Court
- 15°55′29.9″S 5°43′04.8″W
- Jurisdiction: Saint Helena
- Location: Jamestown, Saint Helena, STHL1ZZ
- Coordinates: 15°55′29.9″S 5°43′04.8″W

Chief Magistrate
- Currently: Duncan Cooke.
- Since: 1 April 2020

St Helena Magistrates' Court is a Magistrates' Court in Jamestown, Saint Helena, which is part of the British Overseas Territory of Saint Helena, Ascension and Tristan da Cunha. It is a court of summary jurisdiction and one of three courts on the island, the others being the Saint Helena Supreme Court, the Court of Appeal and the Juvenile Court. The Magistrates' Court has jurisdiction to try any offence which carries a sentence of fewer than 14 years imprisonment. The Court can pass a maximum sentence of 18 months imprisonment (or 3 years for more than one offence) when constituted of a bench of Lay Magistrates or 5 years if the case is heard by the Chief Magistrate.

== Criminal jurisdiction ==
Saint Helena is a British Overseas Territory and follows English law in place prior to 2006, as well as legislation from the local legislature, known as Ordinances. Criminal cases are usually, although not exclusively, investigated by the Saint Helena Police Service and then prosecuted at the court by the Crown Prosecutor. Defendants are entitled to legal representation from a Lay Advocate or from the island's Public Solicitor's Office

== Description ==
The building sits adjacent to the Castle in Jamestown, the capital of Saint Helena. It comprises one courtroom and also houses the Supreme Court. By virtue of its location in the South Atlantic Ocean, more than 2,000 kilometers (1,200 mi) from the nearest major landmass, the court is the most remote courthouse on earth.

== See also ==
- Saint Helena Supreme Court
- Saint Helena Police Service
