= Economy of Saint Helena =

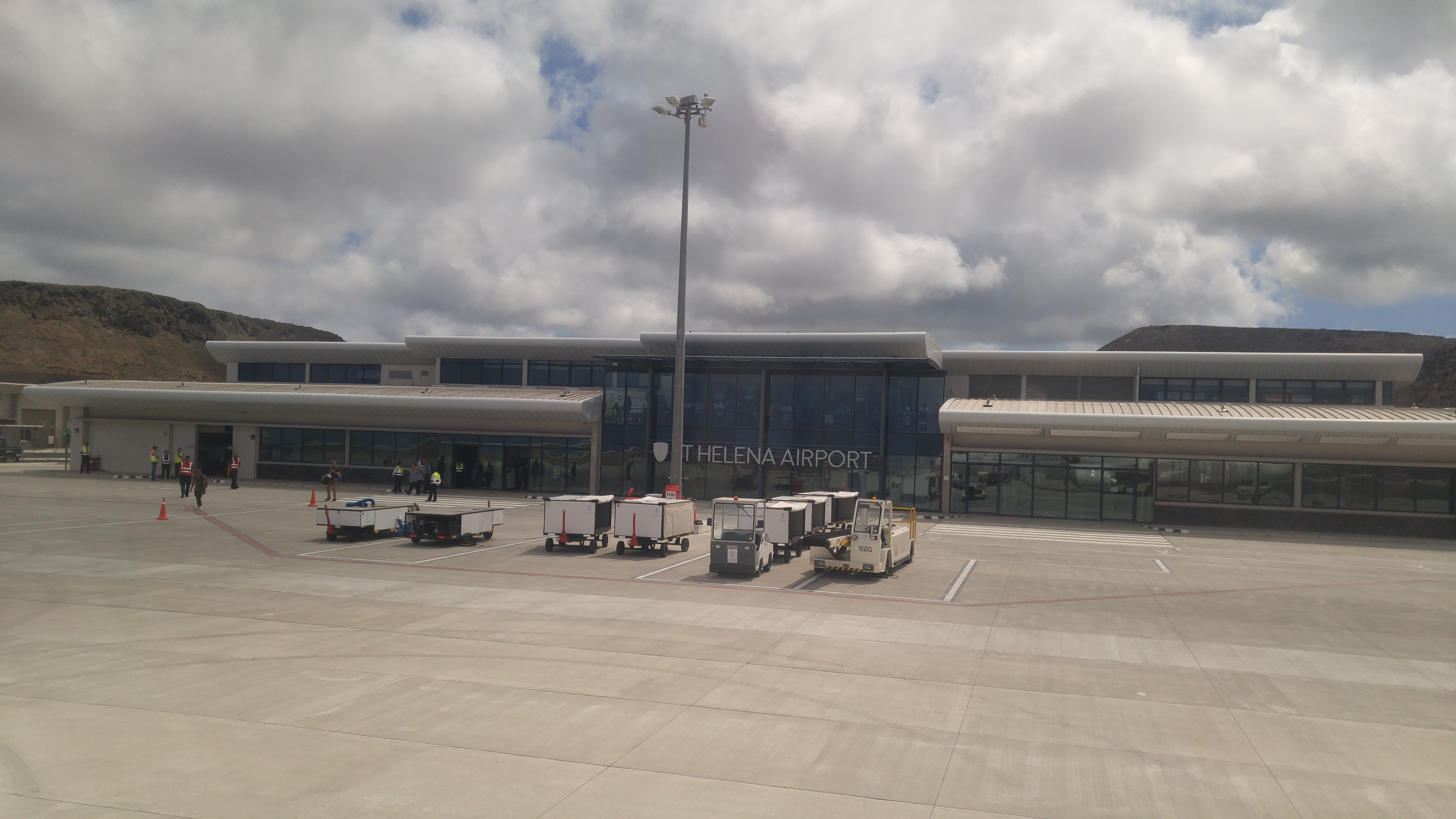
Saint Helena Airport

The economy of Saint Helena is based on export income from coffee, tourism, fishing, and sales of alcoholic liqueurs. Unemployment is very low in Saint Helena; the February 2016 Census stated that 76 people declared that they were unemployed (with 10 claiming unemployment benefit) compared to an economically active population of 2,539 and a total population of 4,534. Saint Helena is one of four countries which depend on financial assistance from the United Kingdom, which amounted to about £22.5 million in 2016–17. This supplements the £12.6 million raised from local tax revenues.

The international airport has been open for private jets and Medivac services since 2016. A scheduled commercial air service began in October 2017. With a total investment of £285m the airport is the largest single investment ever made in the island. Until 2016, the only way to reach the island was by boat. The last working Royal Mail Ship made its final voyage serving St Helena in 2018.

Saint Helena's gross domestic product (GDP) for the 2018–19 financial year was £38.5 million and GDP per capita was £7,392 and GNP per capita was £8,230. In 2019, there was an annual rate of inflation of 3.3%, and a median employment income was £8,410.

The major private sector employers of the islands are Solomons and Co and Thorpes, both providing services in almost all sectors.

The government's economic development priorities are developing a sustainable tourism industry and reducing dependency on imports.

== Industry ==
Saint Helena has several sectors in its economy: fisheries, agriculture (including coffee), construction, retail, and accommodation and food service industries.

=== Workforce ===
In 2016, Saint Helena had a workforce of 2,539. Many St Helenians take up jobs in Ascension Island, the Falklands and the UK.

=== Electricity ===
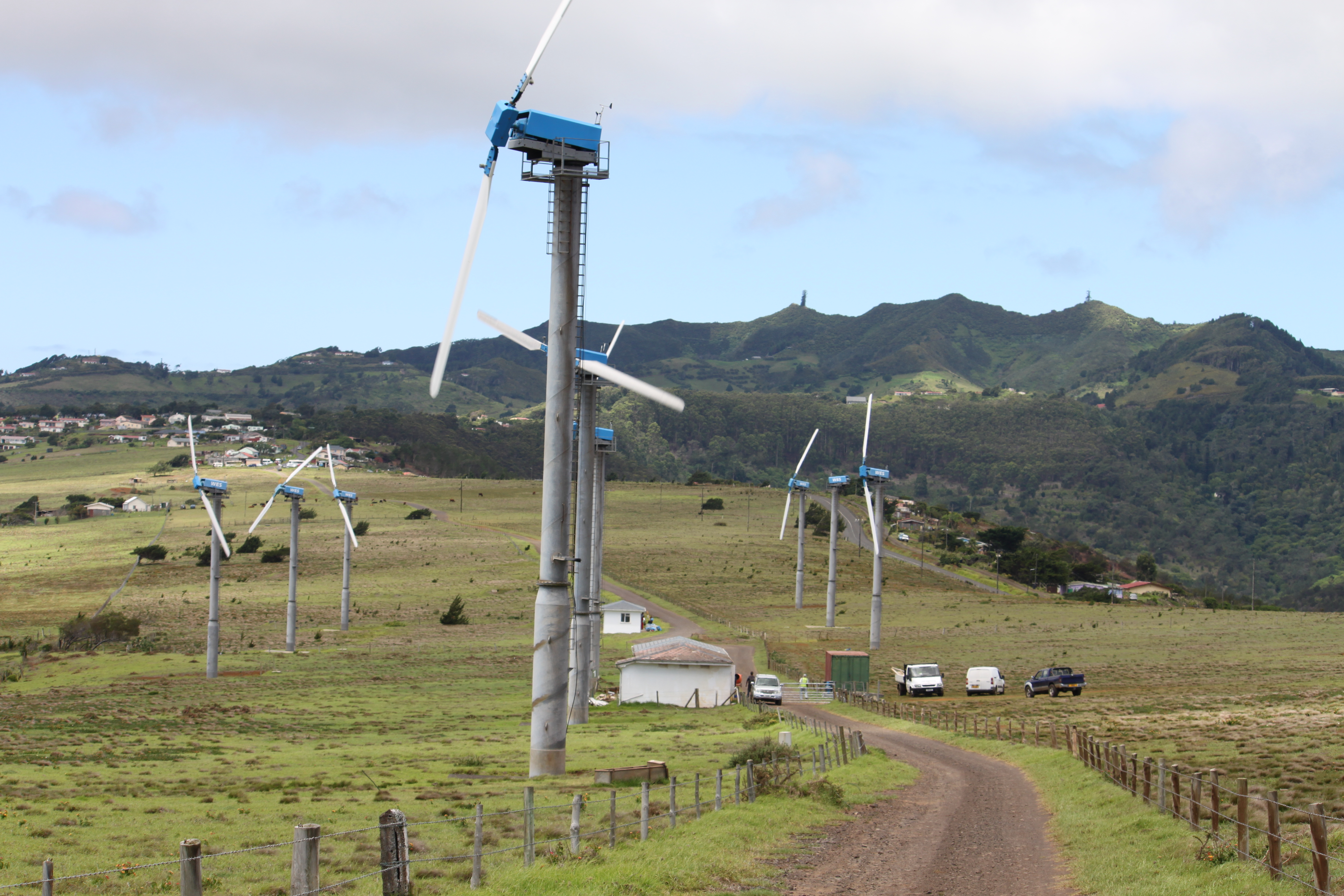
Wind Turbines on the Deadwood Plain

75% of St Helena's power currently comes from 6 diesel generators, but the island is working towards a 100% renewable energy target. There are currently 12 wind turbines grouped on the Deadwood Plain in Longwood, which generate approximately 20% of the island's needs and several photovoltaic arrays which provide the balance. The rifle range solar farm in Half Tree Hollow currently has the largest output of the solar systems with 500 kWh.

=== Agriculture ===
The main agricultural products of Saint Helena are: coffee, fish (predominantly tuna), Timber, and vegetables such as potatoes.

=== Tourism ===
Since the opening of the airport to regular commercial air traffic in 2017, the tourism sector has seen growth. There were 1,350 tourists visiting the island in 2017 and 2,485 in 2019, an increase of over 80% with almost all of the visitors arriving by air. There has been a corresponding steady increase of tourist rooms and other tourism-related infrastructure. Tourism is the largest export sector, valued at 5 to 6 million a year. In 2020, the international closures resulting from COVID-19 pandemic halted tourism at end of the high season.

== Exports ==
The 2019–20 customs data shows the following exports:

- Fisheries (83% of export economy)
- Coffee (17% of export economy)

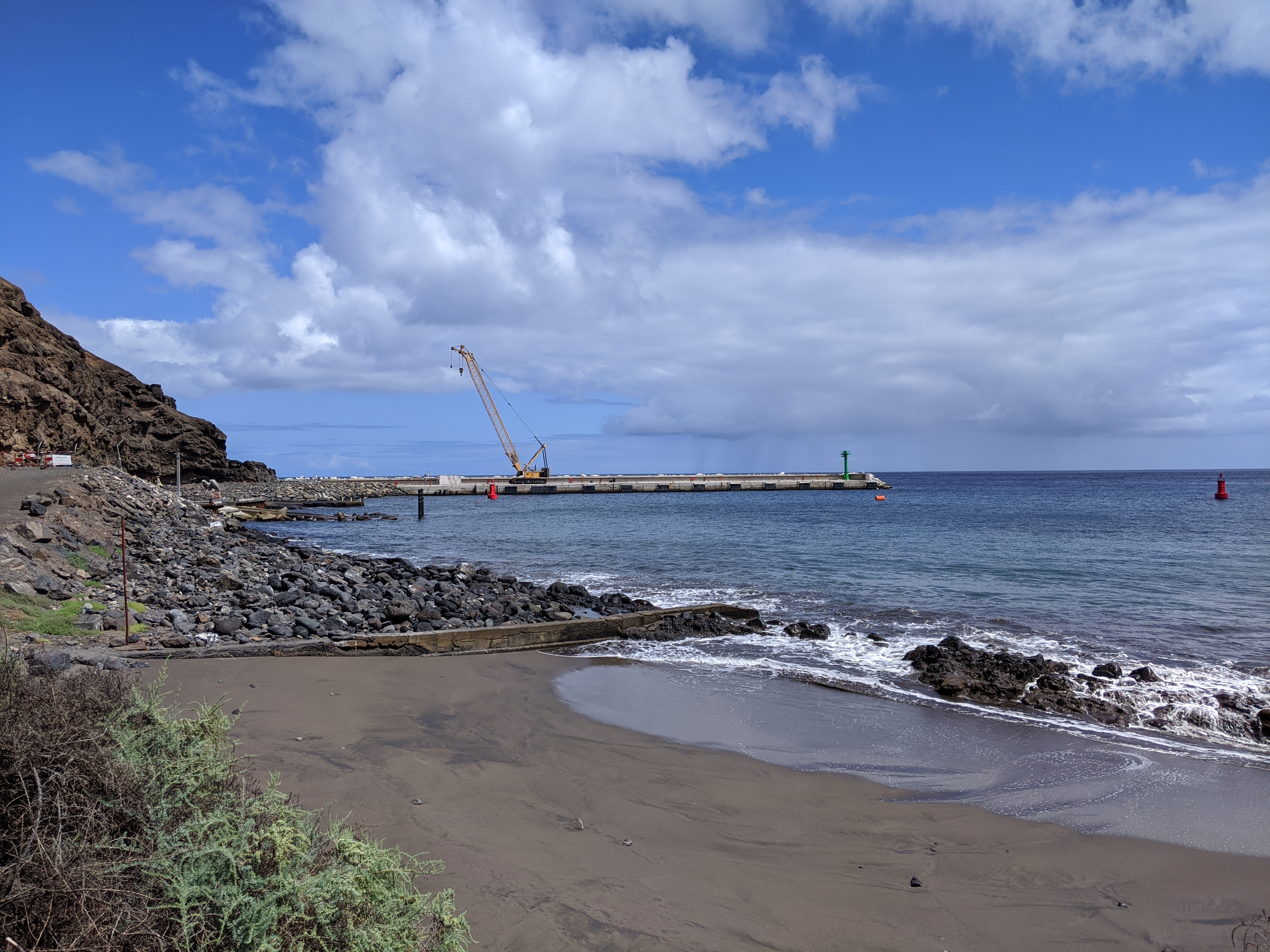
The ship jetty at Ruperts Bay near Jamestown

In 2019, export of products totalled £354,000.

== Imports ==
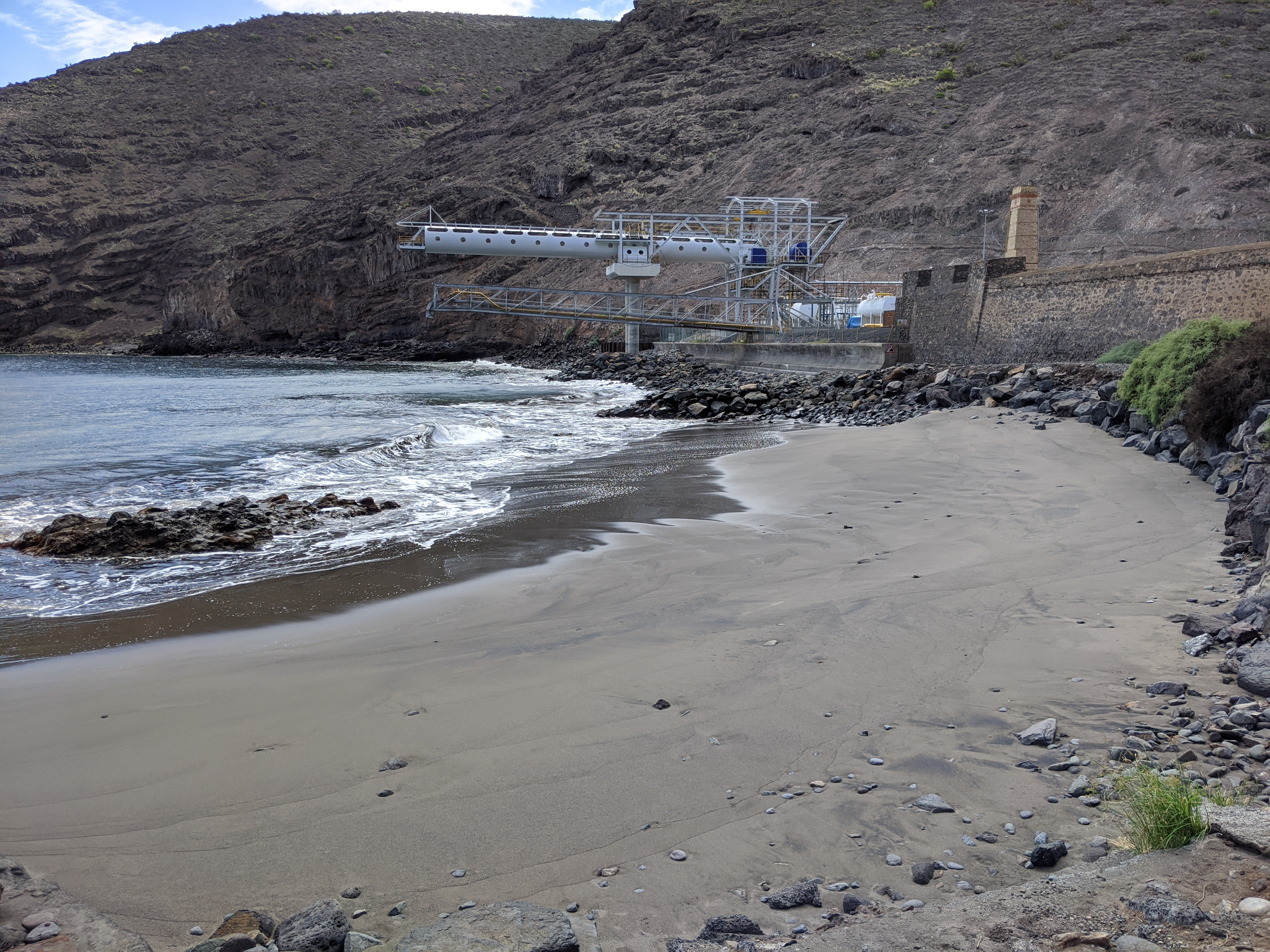
The fuel offloading apparatus at Ruperts

Food and other goods are imported from Cape Town, South Africa and the UK (via Ascension). Shipping is run by AW Ship Management Ltd. Packages can be sent via Rich James International or by Royal H.M. Mail (by Royal Mail anything under 2kg will go by air). Wharf services are provided by Solomons. The trade deficit is significant. In 2019–20 St Helena imported £19.8m in goods, mostly purchased from South Africa (46%) and the United Kingdom (41%).

== Currency ==
The local currency is the Saint Helena pound, which is at a par with the British Pound. The government issues its own coins and banknotes. British pounds are accepted in Saint Helena.

Banking services on Saint Helena are provided by the Bank of St. Helena, which delivers a retail banking service to individuals and business in, and trading with, Saint Helena.

There is no ATM on the island, so cash must be withdrawn from the Bank of Saint Helena cashiers in Jamestown (Monday-Saturday) or at Customs at the wharf (Thursday-Friday). Trials of local debit cards by the bank of Saint Helena began in 2016.

== History ==
In 1957 the price of land on the island was thought to be between £10 and £15 an acre. Eggs were 3 shillings a dozen and bread was 6d for a 1 1/2lb loaf.

== See also ==
- Saint Helena Airport
