= Pound sterling in the South Atlantic and the Antarctic =

The United Kingdom possesses a number of islands in the South Atlantic Ocean and claims a section of the Antarctic continent. These territories are St. Helena with Ascension Island and Tristan da Cunha, the Falkland Islands, South Georgia and the South Sandwich Islands, and the UK's claimed Antarctic territory, called the British Antarctic Territory. The official currency in these territories is either Pound sterling or a local currency that evolved from sterling and is at a fixed one-to-one parity with sterling.

Until 1929–1930, when the Australian pound and New Zealand pound ceased to be at parity with sterling, sterling was also the currency of the Australian claim to Antarctic territory and the corresponding claim of New Zealand, the so called Ross Dependency.

== Saint Helena, Ascension and Tristan da Cunha ==
St. Helena used sterling currency as in the United Kingdom until 1976 when it began to issue its own banknotes at par with the pound sterling. In 1984, this territory also began to issue its own coinage, with the same sizes as the coinage of the United Kingdom. Also similar to British coinage, Queen Elizabeth II is found on the obverse but the reverse have quite different designs referring to the territory. Whereas the coins are struck with “Saint Helena • Ascension”, the banknotes only say “Government of St. Helena”. Commemorative coins are struck separately for the two entities, and say either just “St. Helena” or “Ascension Island”. The St. Helena currency also circulates on Ascension Island, but not in the other part of the territory, Tristan da Cunha, where UK currency circulates. Sterling currency is also in circulation on St. Helena and Ascension, and until 2019 coins from Falkland Islands were accepted as well.

== The Falkland Islands ==
The Falkland Islands used sterling currency as in the United Kingdom until 1899 when it began to issue its own banknotes at par with the pound sterling. In 1974, this territory also began to issue its own coinage, with the size and the portrait of Queen Elizabeth II on the obverse similar to the coinage of the United Kingdom but with different designs with Falkland Islands fauna and coat of arms on the reverse.

== South Georgia and the South Sandwich Islands ==
South Georgia and the South Sandwich Islands has no permanent residents. Government officials there use UK currency. The Government of the islands nevertheless issues official commemorative coins for the territory minted by British Pobjoy Mint.

== British Antarctic Territory ==
The currency of the British Antarctic Territory is the Pound sterling. In the London Gazette of 9 October 1970 a notice appeared under the heading of "State Intelligence". It was a proclamation by the Queen calling in all farthings, halfpennies and half-crowns in the Falkland Islands, the Dependencies of the Falkland Islands and the British Antarctic Territory. It stated,

Elizabeth R. We, in exercise of the powers conferred by section 11 of the Coinage Act 1870, do hereby, by and with the advice of Our Privy Council, call in, in the Falkland Islands, the Dependencies of the Falkland Islands and the British Antarctic Territory, all farthings, halfpennies and half-crowns by 31st day of October 1970, and direct that after that date those coins shall not be current or legal tender within those territories.

In the United Kingdom, these coins had already been demonetized, and in the case of the farthing, as long ago as 1960.

== Sources ==
- Chalmers, R. (1972). A History of Currency in the British Colonies. John Drury.
- The Australian yearbooks from 1921
- The New Zealand yearbooks from 1921
