= Bank of St. Helena =

State bank

Bank of St Helena Ltd
- Company type: Limited company
- Industry: Financial services
- Founded: 1 April 2004
- Headquarters: Market Street, Jamestown, Saint Helena
- Area served: Saint Helena; Ascension Island
- Key people: Michael Bird, Chairman; Leeanne Henry, Managing Director
- Products: Banking
- Owner: Government of Saint Helena
- Number of employees: 42
- Website: https://www.sainthelenabank.com/

The Bank of St. Helena is a government-owned bank based in the British Overseas Territory of Saint Helena, Ascension and Tristan da Cunha. It operates branches on St. Helena and Ascension Island. The Government of St. Helena owns 100% of the bank which is operated as a parastatal. The governor then appoints the board of directors. The bank holds deposits of around SHP 73.2 million. On the asset side, lending accounts for SHP 16.5 million, and SHP 56.5 million is invested.

== Services ==
The bank offers both current and savings accounts to personal customers, as well as business banking from its two offices, one in Jamestown, Saint Helena, and the other in Georgetown, Ascension Island.

The bank also offers services to tourists and others visiting Saint Helena and Ascension Island. These include currency exchange, encashment of traveller's cheques and providing cash advances on selected credit/debit cards.

The bank maintains a relationship with Lloyds Bank, allowing its customers to use their banking network for United Kingdom and international money transmission.

Current details of the bank's services are available on its website.

== Money and banking on Saint Helena ==
The currency commissioners, part of the government of Saint Helena, issue the island's banknotes and coins. The Bank of St. Helena is the island's only bank and the island does not have a central bank. The bank sets its own deposit and lending rates. As of April 2023 the maximum savings rate is 5.5% and the normal personal lending rate is 7%.

=== Online banking ===
Launched in 2014, online banking allows account holders to download statements, make local and international transfers, and set-up monthly journals. Business customers have additional features such as Direct Debit. Online banking is only available to customers with a personal or business current account, and is free of charge.

=== Local debit cards ===
Since 2017, local debit cards can be used to shop around St Helena without withdrawing cash. The cards have QR codes linked to the user's account and spending is debited instantly from the bank account. The cards are not accepted in all shops and stores around St. Helena, but are available to use in the large shopping outlets and most small businesses found around the island.

Local debit cards are only available to customers with a personal or business current account, and are free of charge.

=== Tourist cards ===
Launched in 2023, the tourist card assists short-term visitors with making card payments around St. Helena and Ascension Island. The tourist card is a virtual prepaid GBP cash card available on a mobile device using the designated app. Using this virtual card, tourists can tap into the island’s local card payment service known as St Helena Pay, a service available at select establishments on both islands used for local debit cards.

=== Start smart accounts and cards ===
Launched in 2023, start smart accounts are available to parents or legal guardians of children living on St. Helena Island and Ascension Island aged 13 years to 17 years. A start smart account is managed by the parent or legal guardian, and the start smart card is in the name of the teen and used by them. Start smart cards can be used at locations offering the St Helena Pay Service.

Start smart accounts can only be opened by a parent or legal guardian of the child. A child cannot have more than one card in their name. Start smart cards are only available to teens aged 13 years to 17 years and are free of charge.

== History ==
The Banking Ordinance 2003 and the Bank of St Helena Ordinance 2003 established the bank on 1 April 2004. The bank inherited the assets and liabilities of the Government Savings Bank (in Saint Helena) and the Ascension Island Savings Bank.

The Government Savings Bank in St Helena had been established in 1865.

The bank's first manager was Richard Winch. The full list of managers is as follows:

Richard Winch	1 April 2004 to 31 March 2005
John Turner	1 April 2005 to 31 March 2008
Rosemary Bargo	1 April 2008 to 31 March 2017
Josephine George	1 April 2017 to 30 June 2024
Leeanne Henry	1 July 2025 to present
