= Saint Helena pound =

Currency of the Atlantic islands of Saint Helena and Ascension

ISO 4217
- Code: SHP (numeric: 654)
- Subunit: 0.01

Unit
- Unit: pound
- Plural: pounds
- Symbol: £

Denominations
- Subunit
- 1/100: penny
- Plural
- penny: pence
- Banknotes: £5, £10, £20
- Coins: 1, 2, 5, 10, 20, 50 pence, £1, £2

Demographics
- Date of introduction: February 1976
- User(s): St Helena and Ascension Island (British Overseas Territories; alongside sterling)

Issuance
- Government: Government of Saint Helena
- Website: www.sainthelena.gov.sh

Valuation
- Inflation: 3.2%
- Source: The World Factbook, 1997 est.
- Pegged with: sterling at par

The Saint Helena pound (symbol: £; currency code: SHP) is the currency of the Atlantic islands of Saint Helena and Ascension, which are constituent parts of the British Overseas Territory of Saint Helena, Ascension and Tristan da Cunha. It is fixed at parity with sterling, and so both currencies are commonly accepted and circulated within Saint Helena. Its base unit is the pound, which is subdivided into 100 pence (singular is 'penny').

Tristan da Cunha, the third part of the territory, officially adopted sterling. However, commemorative coins are occasionally minted for the island.

== History ==
Initially, sterling coins circulated on Saint Helena, in units of a pound divided into 20 shillings, each of 12 pence.

That was supplemented by occasional local issues of paper currencies. One coin, a copper halfpenny, was struck in 1821, specifically for use in the islands, and intermingled with sterling coinage. The notes were denominated in pounds and shillings, and valued at par with sterling.

Prior to February 1961, the South African pound, which was then equal in value to sterling, was also accepted on the island, but that ceased with the introduction of the new decimal South African rand, with one rand being worth only 10 shillings sterling.

Until 1976, St. Helena used sterling currency, but in February of that year, the St. Helena Government established the Currency Board and began issuing new decimal banknotes at par with sterling for use on the island. Coins intended for circulation on St. Helena and Ascension were introduced in 1984. The use of those coins and notes was extended to Ascension Island, and later also to Tristan da Cunha. Whereas circulating coins are struck with "Saint Helena • Ascension", the banknotes only say "Government of St. Helena".

For a more general history of currency in the South Atlantic region, see British currency in the South Atlantic and the Antarctic.

== Coins ==
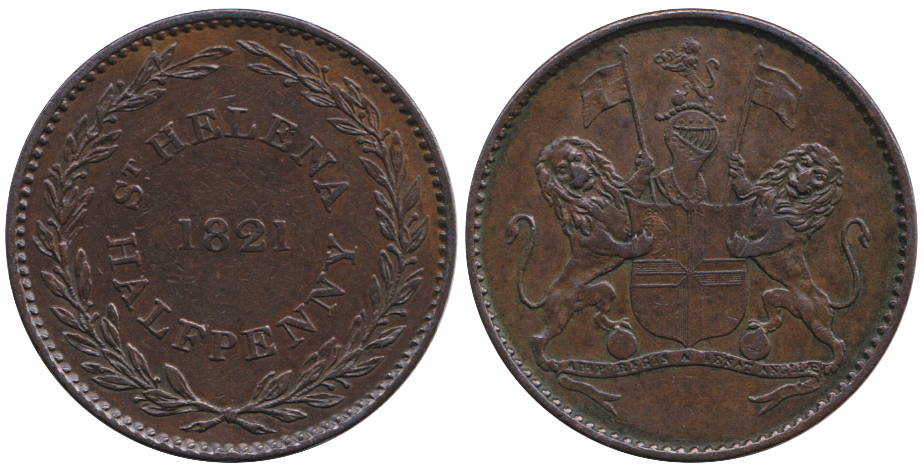
East India Company copper halfpenny minted for St. Helena in 1821

The copper halfpennies introduced in 1821 were issued for Saint Helena by the East India Company, and were used for a majority of the time the company was involved in the area. During that period, the island was used as a penal location for high-ranking political prisoners, including Napoleon Bonaparte. Circulating coinage for St. Helena was not issued again for another 163 years, in 1984.

Prior to 1984, both Saint Helena and Ascension Island had issued non-circulating commemorative coins, but officially used standard circulation coins. The St. Helena-issued banknotes circulated alongside British coins and banknotes.

In 1984, circulating coins were first introduced in the names of St. Helena and Ascension, in denominations of 1, 2, 5, 10, and 50 pence and £1. The coin series was designed by engraver and coin designer Michael Hibbit. All of the coins are the same size and composition as the corresponding British coins and have the same value. Each coin depicts flora and fauna unique to the islands. The coins and notes of St. Helena and Ascension are also in use on the Island of Tristan Da Cunha, along with British coins and notes. Tristan da Cunha is not included on the series by name because the island chain was originally not politically incorporated into the St. Helena and Ascension Colony at the time of the currency's official release. Later issues have yet to include Tristan da Cunha's name as an incorporated territory. Tristan da Cunha still considers sterling to be its official currency.

Non-circulating commemoratives and unofficial coins are issued separately under the name of Tristan da Cunha and the uninhabited Gough Island, but are not recognised legal tender.

Queen Elizabeth's effigy was redesigned on most of the denominations in 1991, followed by the rest in 1998. Seven-sided 20-pence coins were also first introduced in 1998 and, in that same year, older 5- and 10-pence coins were replaced by downsized issues featuring new animal designs. However, the 50-pence coin was not downsized until 2003. Until that time, the original, larger-sized 50-pence coin continued to circulate. In 2002, nickel-brass £1 coins were introduced to replace the note, and bimetallic £2 coins were introduced to the islands the following year. The edge inscriptions of the £2 coins are (in capitals) "500th Anniversary" for the 2002 coin, and "Loyal and Faithful" for the 2003 coin.

All circulating coins have on a portrait of the head of Queen Elizabeth II on the obverse side, with the inscription: "Queen Elizabeth II", "St. Helena • Ascension" and the year. However, many of the commemorative coins over the years have only been inscribed "St. Helena" or "Ascension Island".

Some of the coin reverse designs have changed since 1984. The 5-pence pieces issued prior to 1998 showed the Saint Helena plover (the wirebird, which is the national bird of St Helena), whilst the 10-pence coins issued prior to 1998 showed orchids. The following table shows the current designs:

Depiction of St Helena and Ascension coinage (reverse side)
£0.01	£0.02	£0.05
Tuna	Donkey with firewood	Jonathan
£0.10	£0.20	£0.50
Dolphin	Ebony	Green sea turtle
£1.00	£2.00	
Sooty tern	Coat of arms of Saint Helena	

== Banknotes ==
Especially in comparison to other British colonies, St. Helena has a long history of issuing its own currencies, which have come and gone over various economic periods.

From 1716, the Governor and Council of the Island of St Helena issued notes for 2/6 and 5/- and £1 and £2, which were issued up until the late 18th century.

The next issue of notes occurred sometime after 1917. It was produced by the St Helena Currency Board in denominations of 5/-, 20/- and 40/-.

In 1976, the currency board of the Government of Saint Helena began issuing £1 and £5 notes, followed by 50p and £10 notes in 1979.

The 50p and £1 notes were withdrawn and replaced by coins in 1984, and £20 notes were first introduced in 1986. A redesign of the £5 note was introduced in 1988.

In 2004, a new series of £10 and £20 notes was introduced, produced by De La Rue Banknote and Engraving Company, featuring a redesign and newer security features. With the introduction of the new series, the £1 note was discontinued and withdrawn from circulation.

A new series of banknotes made of polymer was announced for release in January 2026, in denominations of £5, £10 and £20. The designs feature Charles III, as well as Jonathan and Trochetiopsis ebenus.

== Usage in financial transactions ==
The only bank on Saint Helena and Ascension is the Bank of Saint Helena. All accounts in this bank use pounds as currency, which can be considered Saint Helena pounds because SHP banknotes are given on withdrawal. All international transfers have to be done in sterling, euros, South African rand, or United States dollars. Credit card usage by visitors on the island will have sterling as currency. This means that SHP does not exist as transfer currency outside the islands.

== Exchange rates ==
The Bank of St Helena publishes the exchange rates for its currency exchange. The exchange rate for the Saint Helena pound against sterling is 1:1, although exchange or transfer fees can be incurred.

Indicative rates for other currencies can be obtained as follows:

Current SHP exchange rates
From Google Finance:	AUD CAD CHF CNY EUR GBP HKD JPY USD ZAR
From Yahoo! Finance:	AUD CAD CHF CNY EUR GBP HKD JPY USD ZAR
From XE.com:	AUD CAD CHF CNY EUR GBP HKD JPY USD ZAR
From OANDA:	AUD CAD CHF CNY EUR GBP HKD JPY USD ZAR

== See also ==
- Bank of St Helena
- Economy of Saint Helena
