= Blue Hill, Saint Helena =

Coordinates: 15°57′49″S 5°44′43″W

Blue Hill
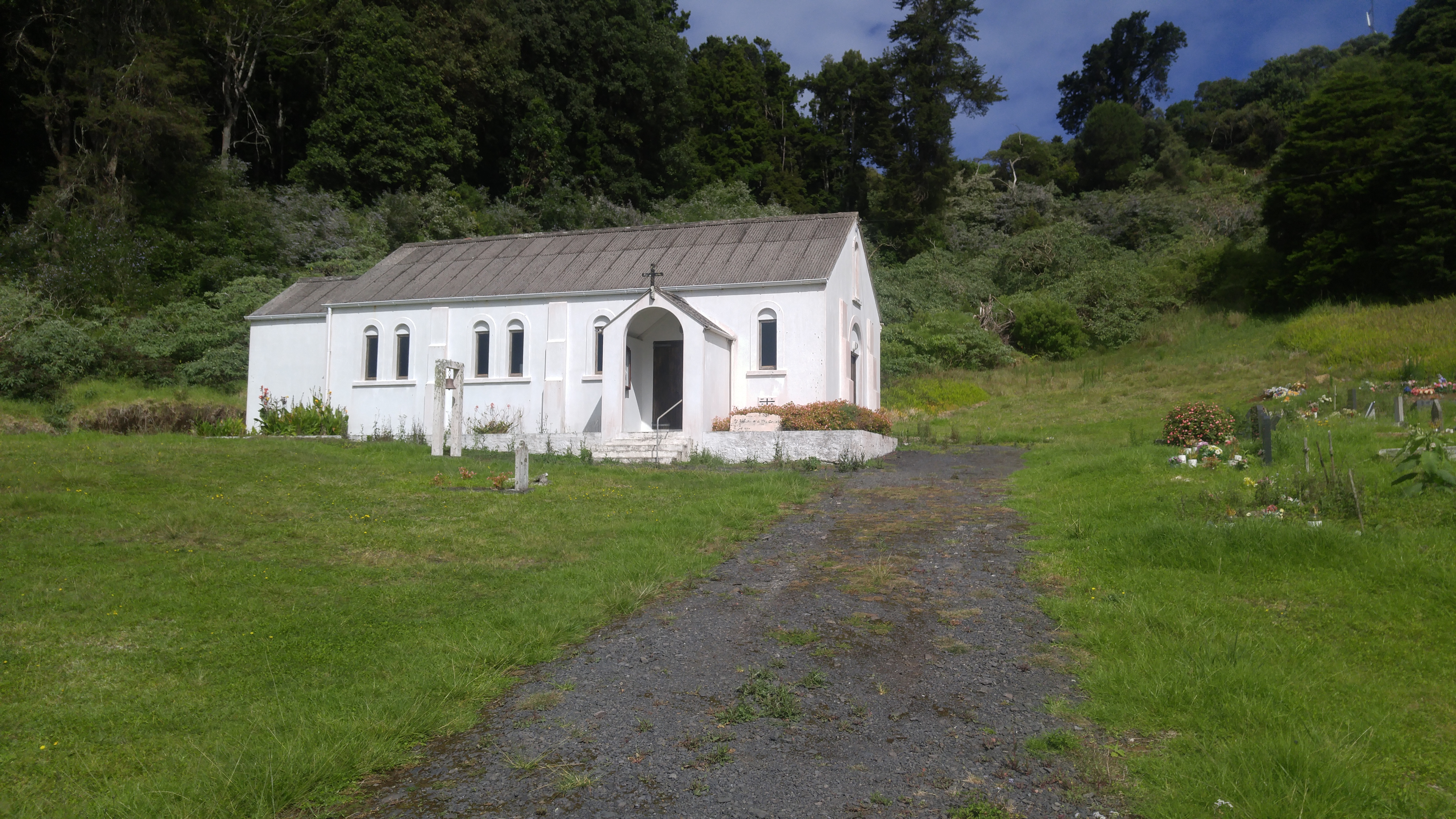
- The Cross church in Blue Hill, Saint Helena

- Blue Hill in Saint Helena
- Sovereign state: United Kingdom
- British overseas territory: Saint Helena, Ascension and Tristan da Cunha
- Island: Saint Helena
- Status: District
- Seat: Blue Hill Village

Population (2021)
  - Total: 174

Blue Hill is one of eight districts of the island of Saint Helena, part of the British Overseas Territory of Saint Helena, Ascension and Tristan da Cunha in the South Atlantic Ocean. It is sparsely populated and comprises the western third of the island. The district is entirely agricultural with no industrial activity.

== Description ==
Terrain in the district is quite varied with steep ridges and a limited amount of flat ground, as befits the island's volcanic origin. Blue Hill's main settlement, with the location of the community centre, is Blue Hill Village. The district also includes the settlements of Barren Ground, Head o' Wain, and Thompson's Wood, together with a few scattered cottages.

The only school in Blue Hill closed in 1990, only two years after it had opened, but there is a Baptist Chapel at Head o'Wain and an Anglican Church, St. Helena & The Cross, just next to The Depot, a small hill on the ridge that separates Blue Hill from Sandy Bay. Planning permission was received to build a resort at Broad Bottom in November 2015, but construction has yet to begin as of November 2016.

Blue Hill is the largest, most remote, most rural, least populated and least densely populated of the eight districts of Saint Helena. Its population has fluctuated from 177 in 1998 to 153 in 2008 and 174 in 2021.

== History ==
Troops of the Dutch East India Company landed at Swanley Valley on 20 December 1672 and were guided inland by an English traitor. They defeated the garrison of High Peak Fort and briefly occupied the rest of the island until the English recaptured it in May 1673. During the Boer War, the British transported over 5,000 Boer prisoners of war to St Helena between 1900 and 1902. After problems developed between prisoners from the Transvaal and the Orange Free State, the British transferred the Free Staters to a new camp in Broad Bottom in early 1901. They were repatriated at the end of the war in late 1902.

In 2011 a facetious proposal was published in The Washington Post (and reproduced in the St Helena Independent) that Blue Hill be made into a "retirement village for exiled dictators", citing its isolation and small existing population.

== Bibliography ==
- Denholm, Ken. "South Atlantic Fortress" (PDF). Saint Helena Island Info. Archived from the original (PDF) on 26 November 2016.
