= Sandy Bay, Saint Helena =

Coordinates: 15.983°S 5.718°W

Sandy Bay
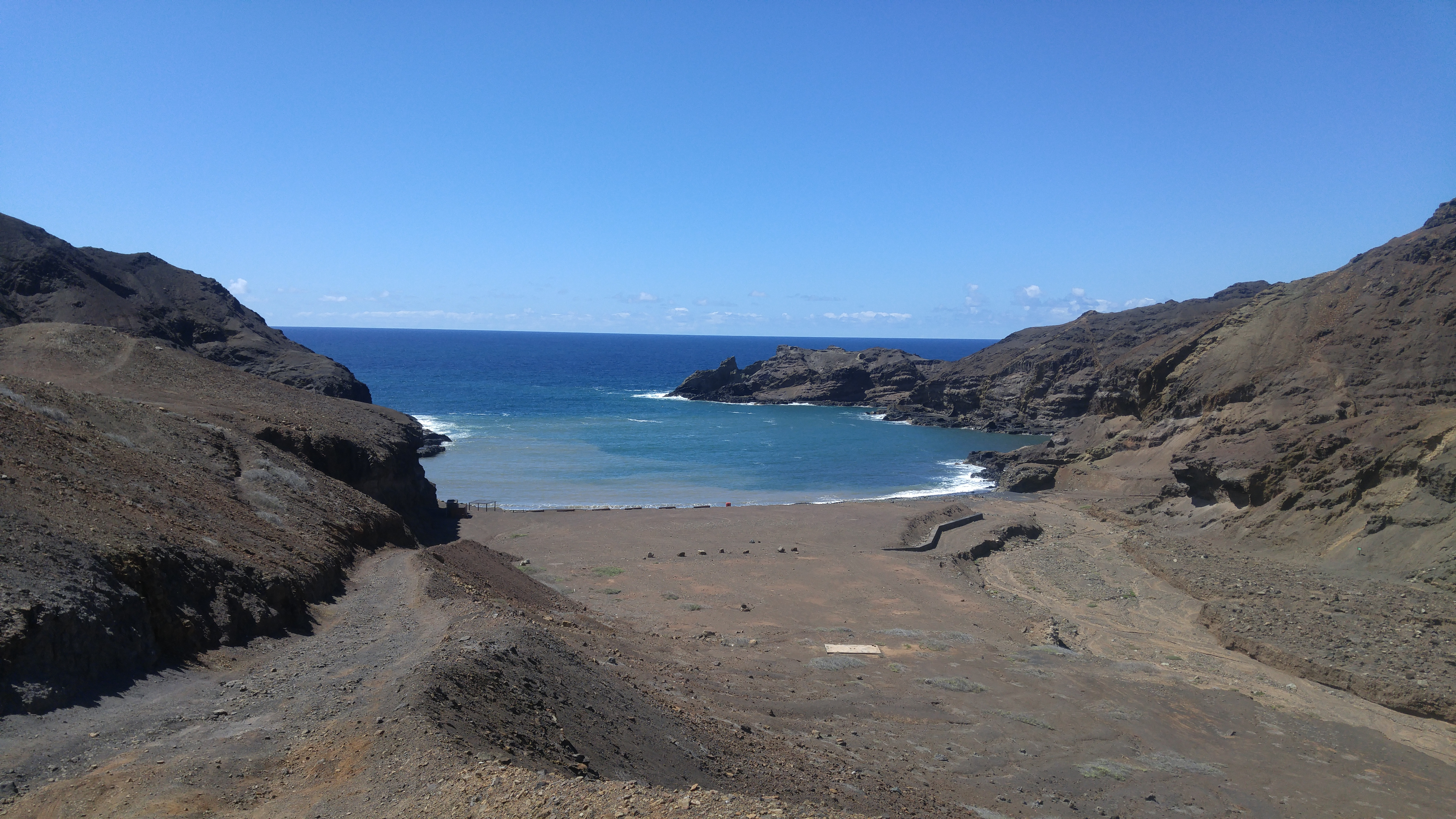
- Sandy Bay Beach

- Sandy Bay in Saint Helena
- Sovereign state: United Kingdom
- British overseas territory: Saint Helena, Ascension and Tristan da Cunha
- Island: Saint Helena
- Status: District

Population (2016)
  - Total: 193 (district)
- Time zone: UTC+0 (GMT)

Sandy Bay is one of eight districts of the island of Saint Helena, part of the British Overseas Territory of Saint Helena, Ascension and Tristan da Cunha in the South Atlantic Ocean. Located on the island's southeastern coast, it is sparsely populated and is a popular recreation site.

== Description ==
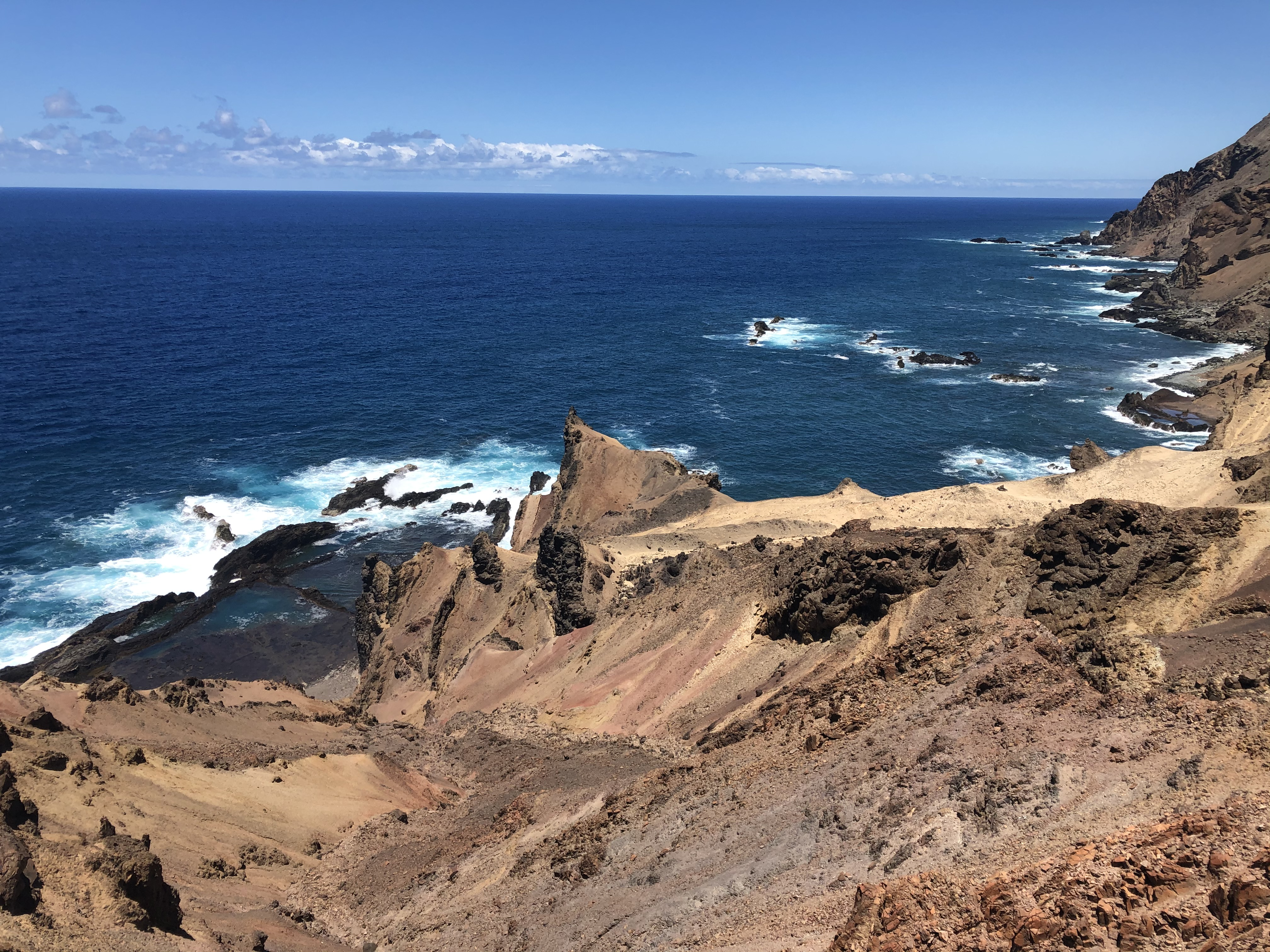
Lot's Wife's Ponds

Terrain in the district is quite varied, with steep ridges and a limited amount of flat ground, as befits the island's volcanic origin. The lower reaches of the bay are generally arid, but the upper area is lushly vegetated. Most of the island's coffee and bananas are grown there. The district has the largest beaches on the island and is a popular recreation spot. Due to its southeastern location, the beaches are exposed to the prevailing south-easterly winds and subject to erosion from heavy seas. West of the bay, one of the island's Post Box Walks leads to a set of sea stacks and tidal pools called Lot's Wife's Ponds, which are popular for swimming and fishing.

== Demographics ==
Its population has declined from 254 in 1998 to 205 in 2008 and 193 in 2016. Only Blue Hill District has fewer residents.

== History ==
The first fortifications defending Sandy Bay were built after 1708, when extensive limestone deposits were found nearby and a kiln was built to make mortar. The gun battery was built too close to the sea, as it was washed away during a storm in 1734. Eight years later, the battery had been replaced, but it was deemed insufficient to defend the beaches. Shortly afterwards it was replaced by a curtain wall (known as Sandy Bay Line) that spanned the full width of the beach. The eastern side of the line has been partially restored, but the western side has been almost entirely washed away.

The single-gun Beach Hill Battery was built in the late 1700s atop the promontory that divided the beaches.

== Gallery ==
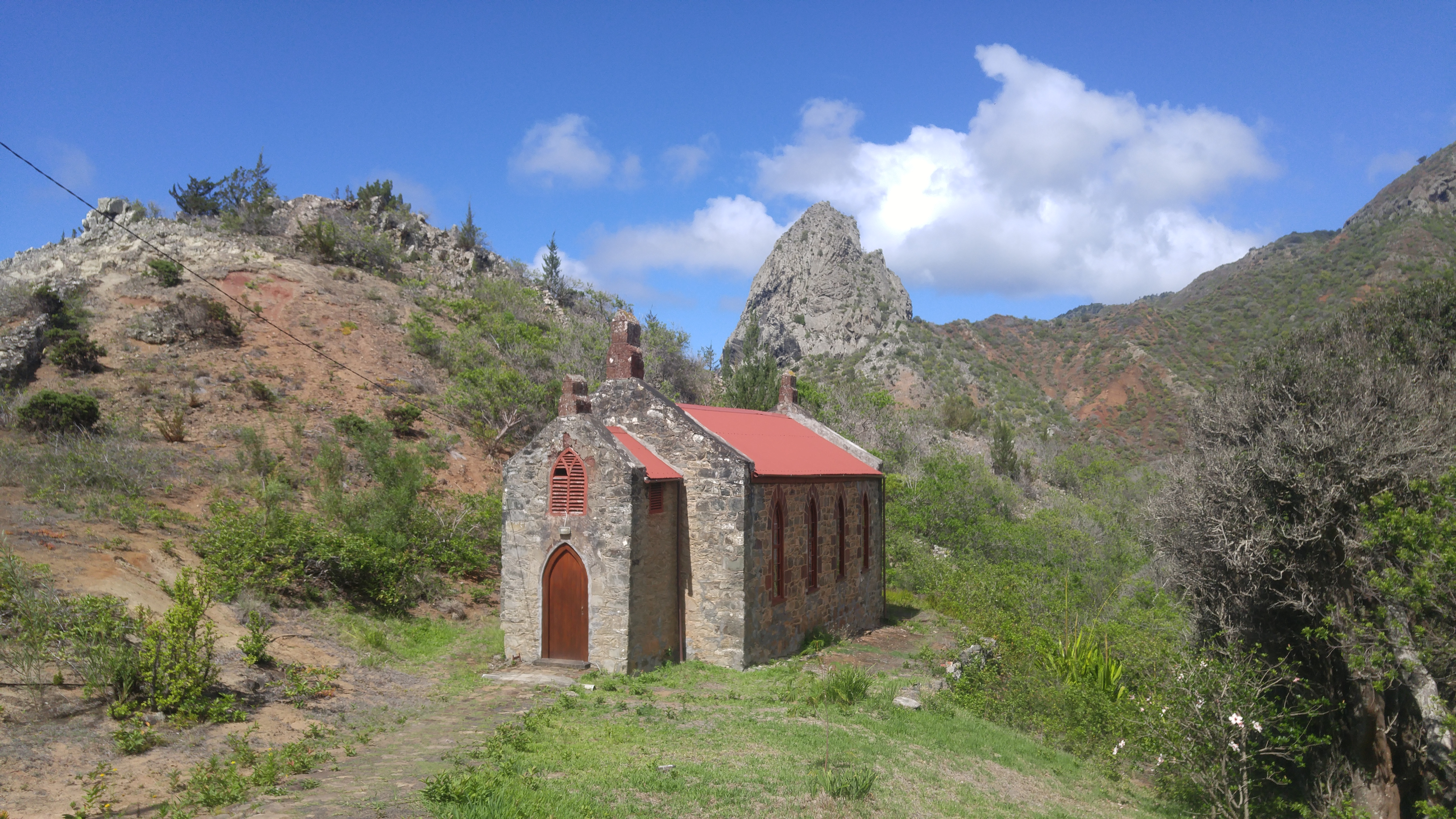
Baptist Chapel

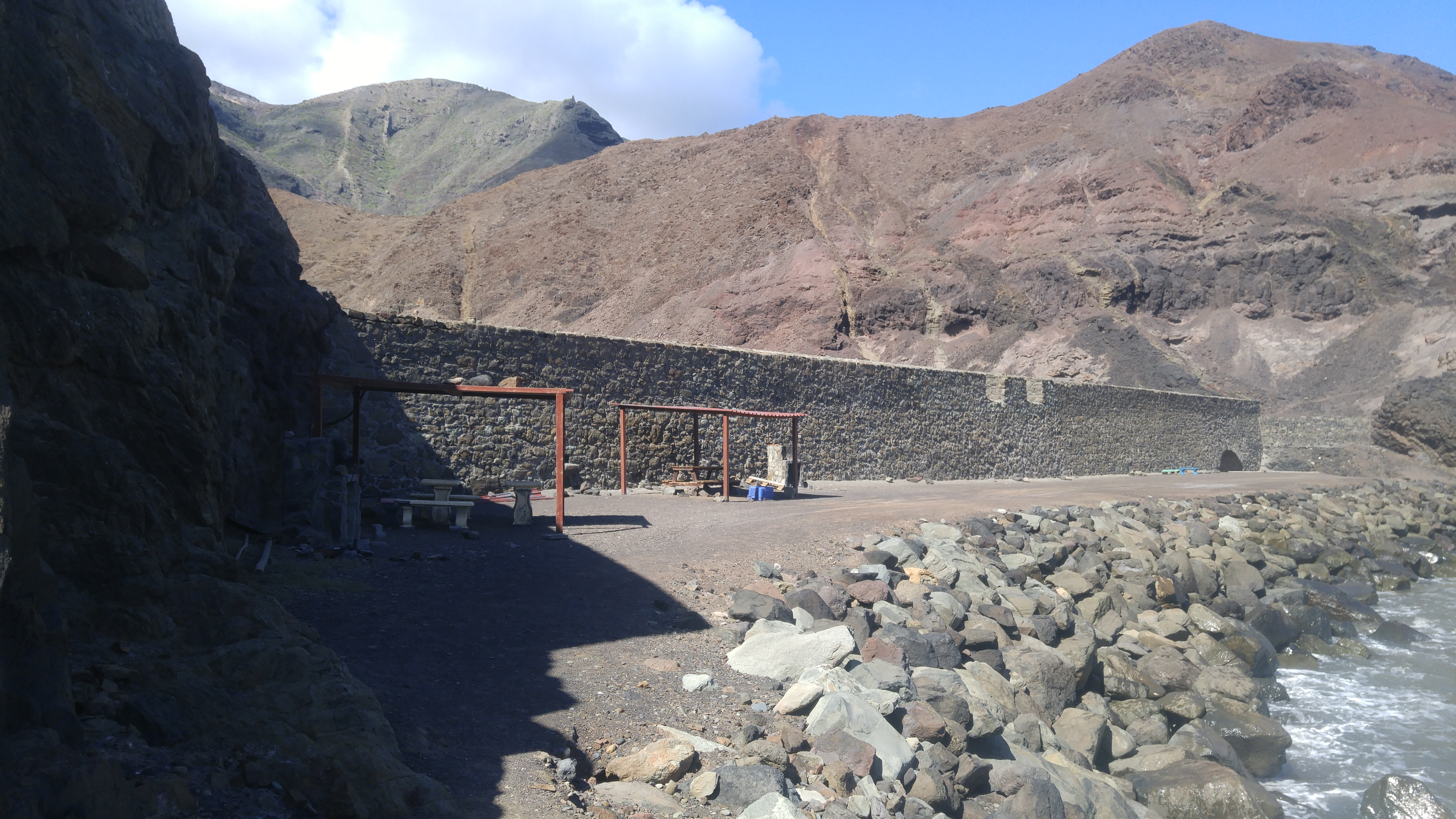
Fortifications near the bay

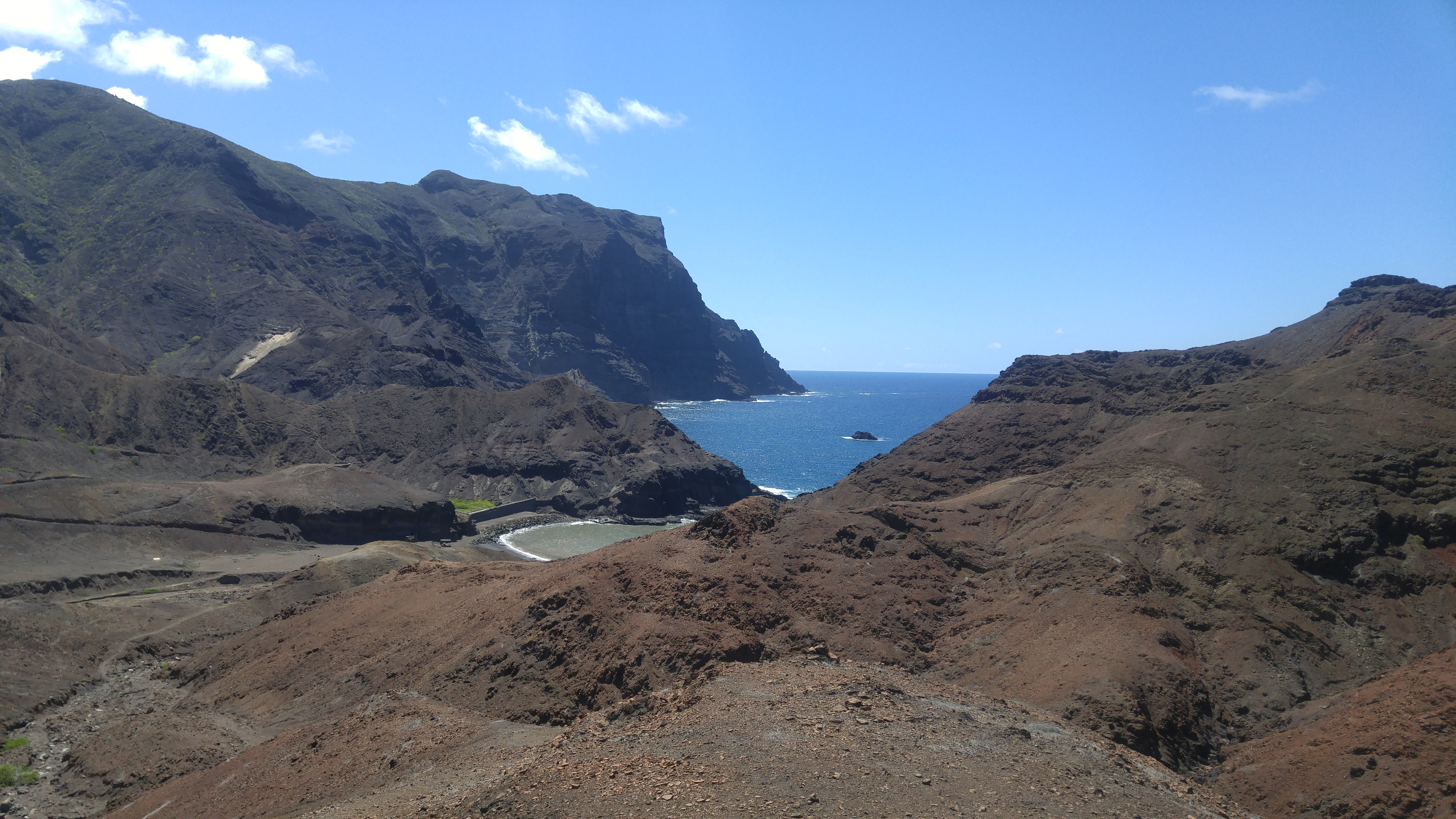
the bay viewed from the west

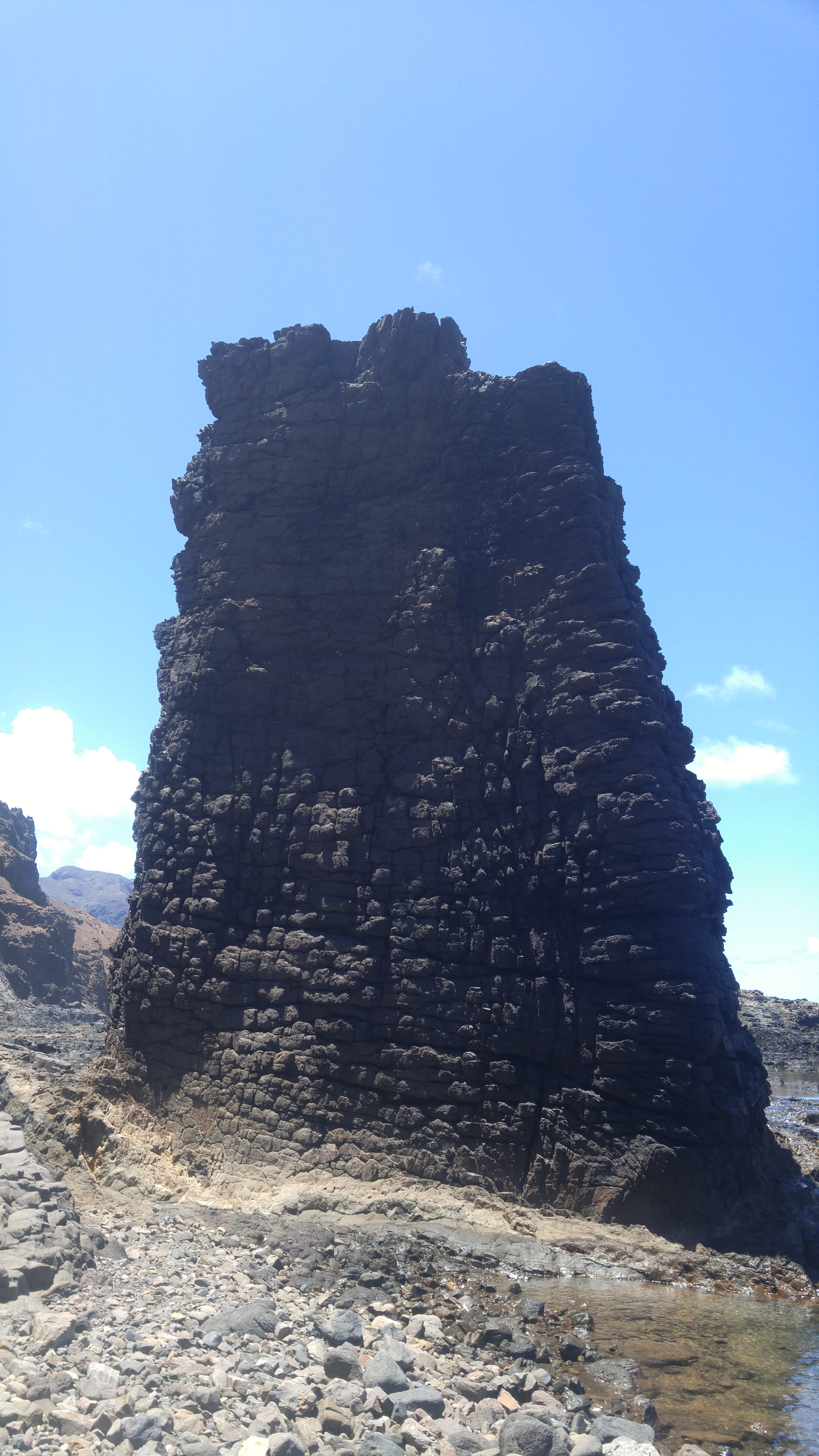
basalt sea stack near Lot's Wife's Ponds, known as "the Chimney"

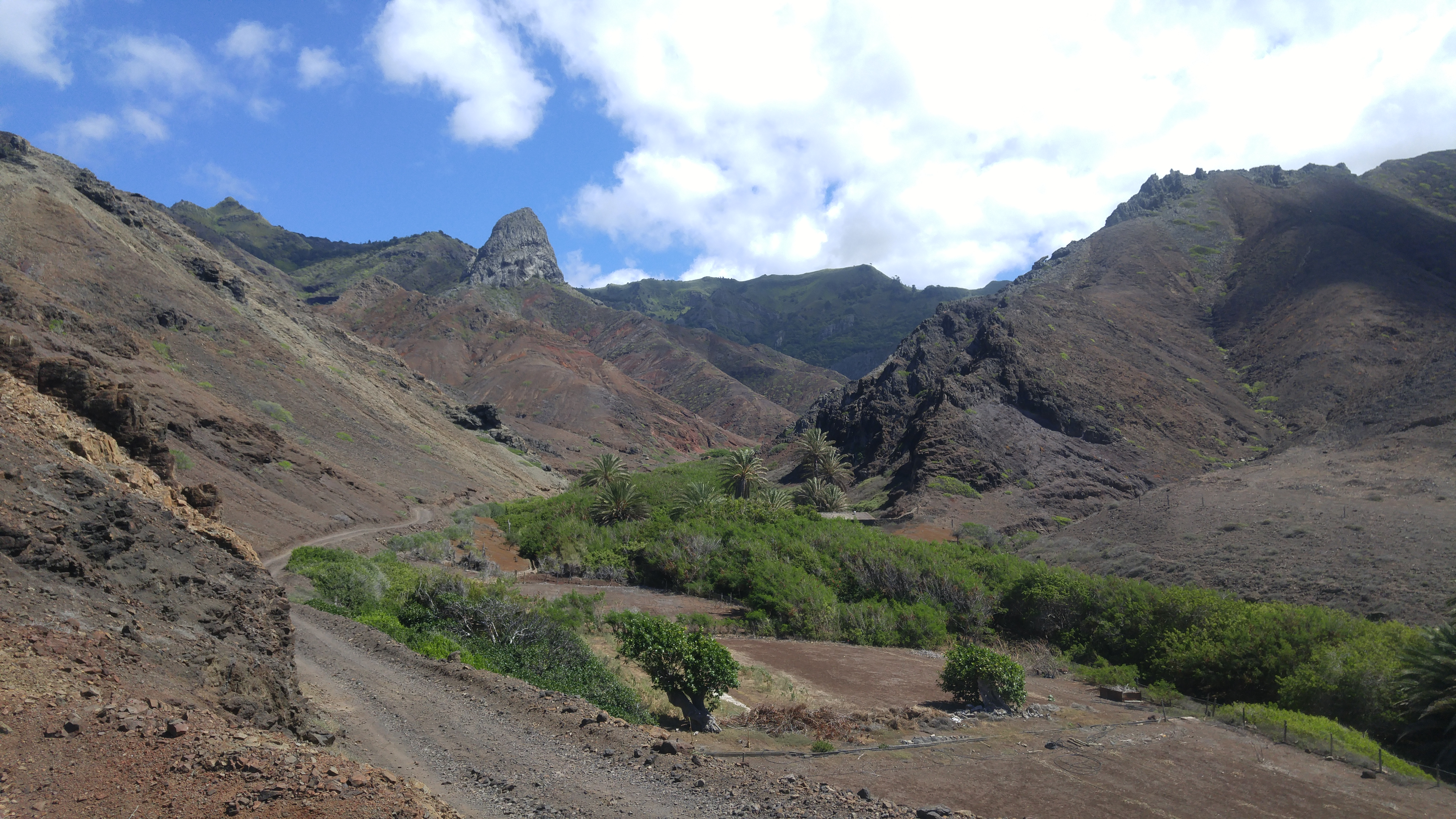
the valley seen from the beach

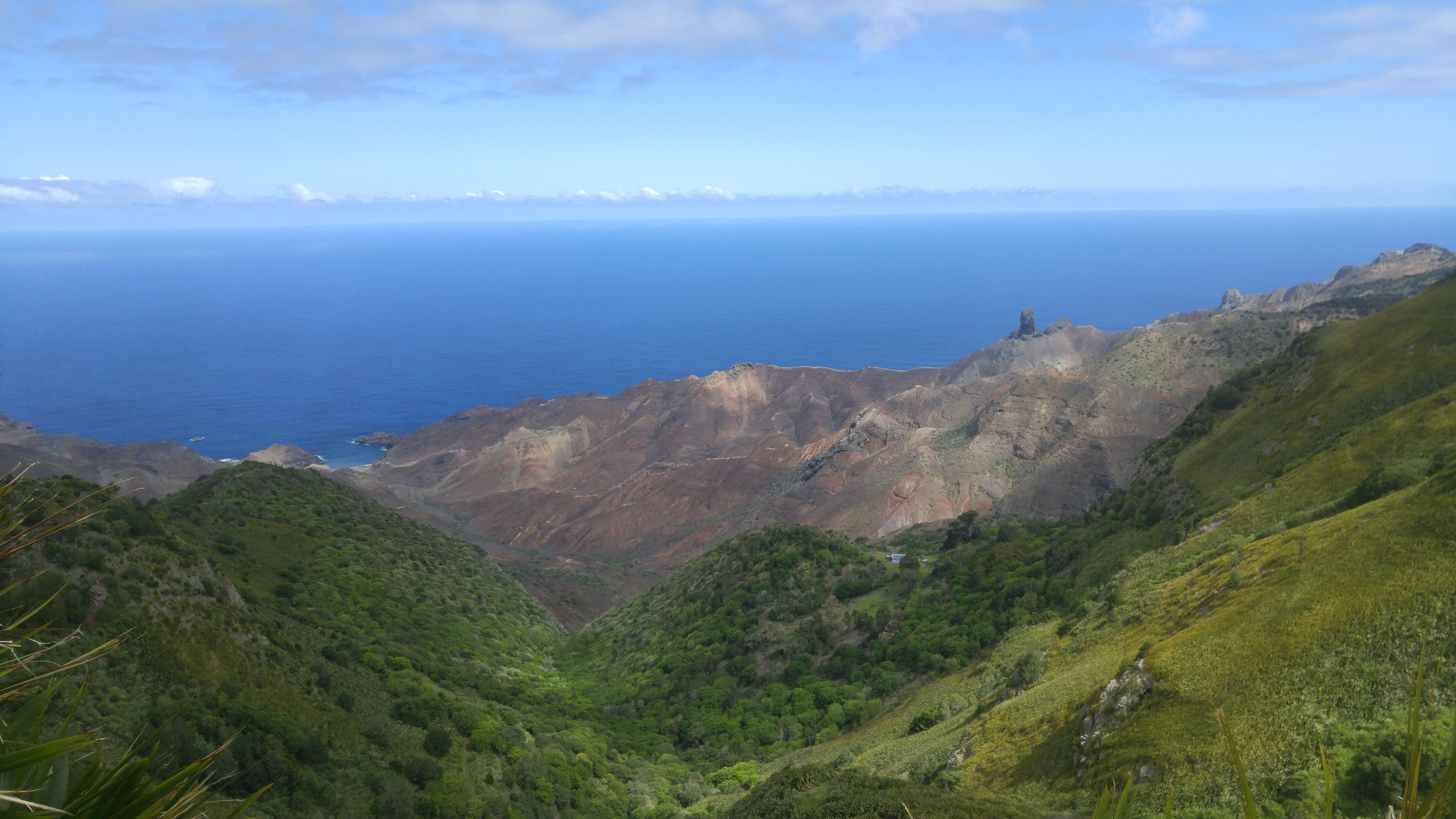
the valley seen from High Peak

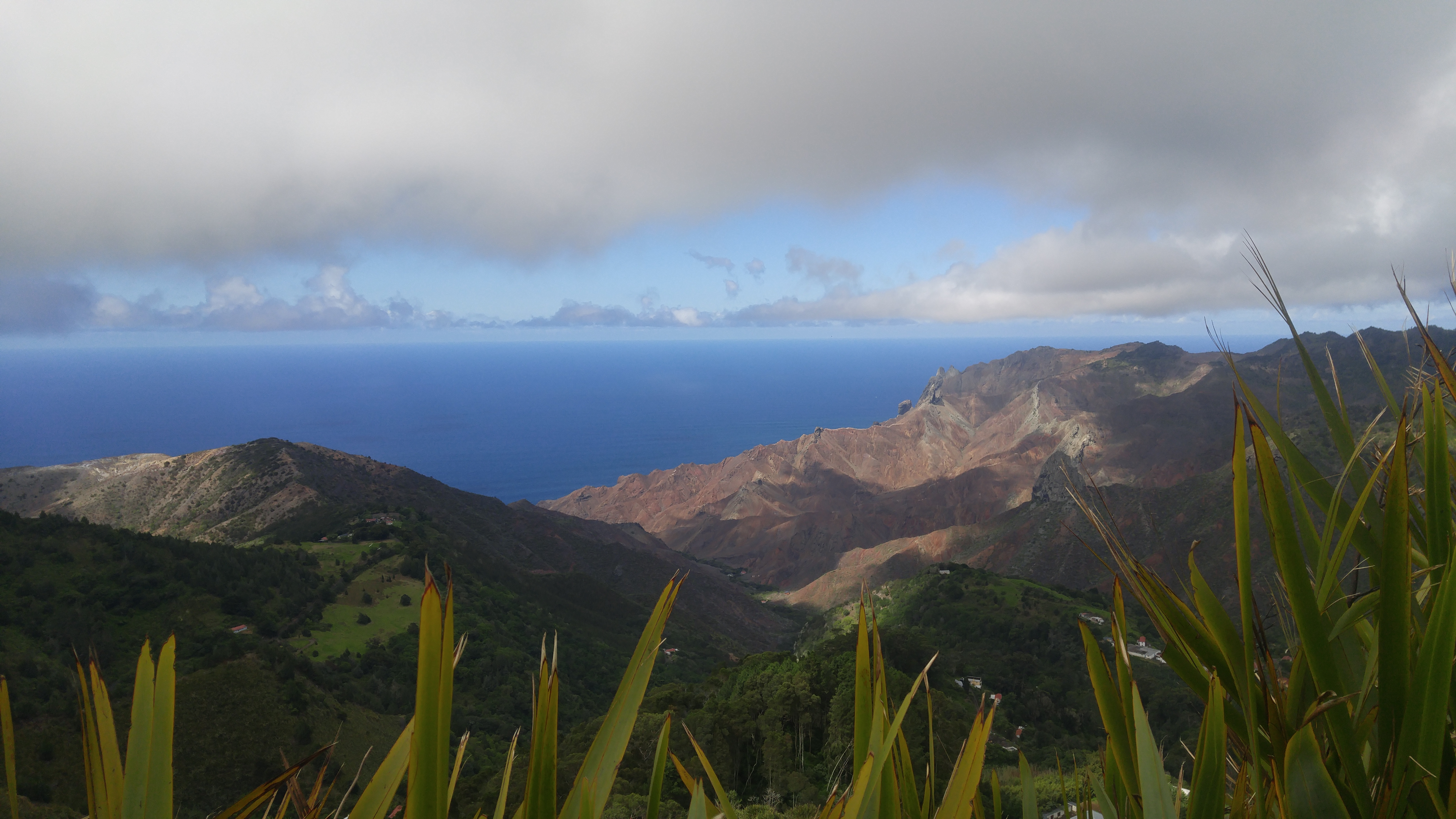
district of Sandy Bay

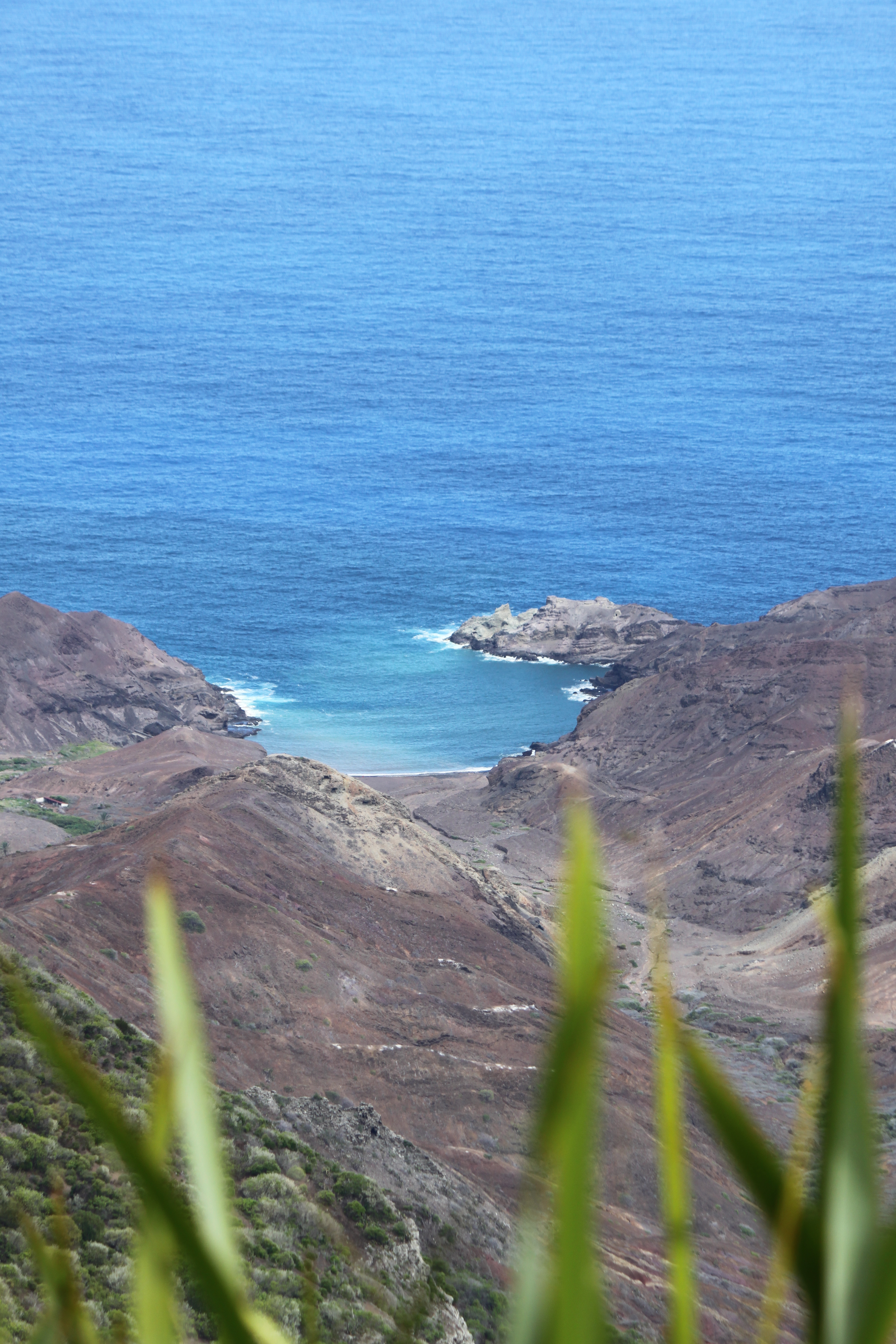
viewed from High Peak

== Bibliography ==
- Denholm, Ken. "South Atlantic Fortress" (PDF). Saint Helena Island Info. Archived from the original (PDF) on 26 November 2016.
