= Supreme Court of St Helena =

Supreme Court in Jamestown, Saint Helena

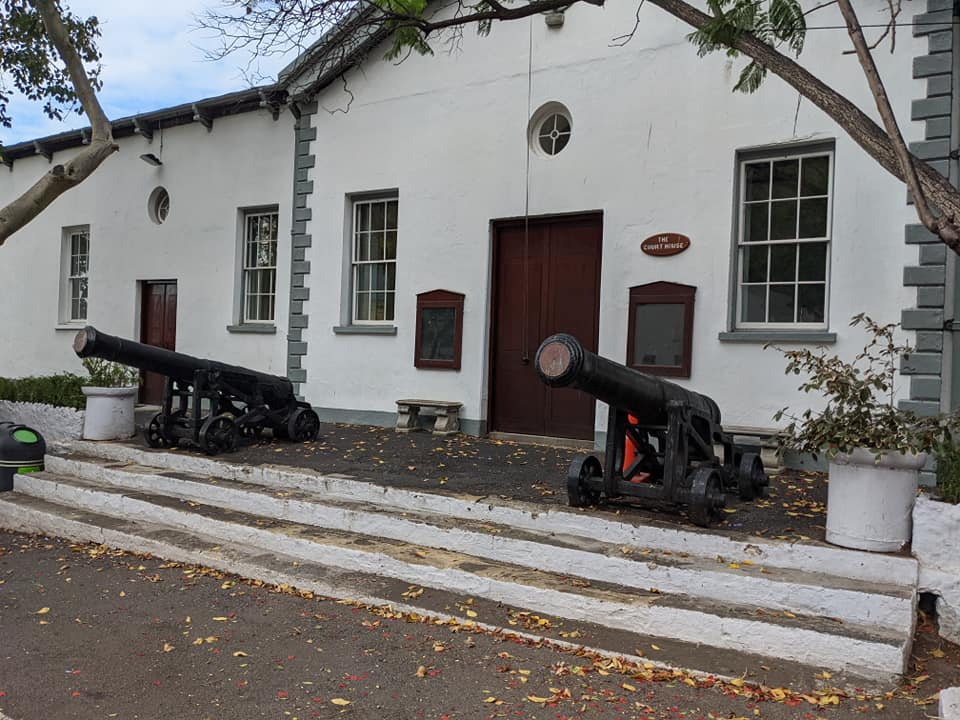
- St Helena Courthouse in 2021
- Interactive map of Supreme Court of St Helena
- 15°55′29.9″S 5°43′04.8″W
- Jurisdiction: Saint Helena, Ascension and Tristan da Cunha
- Location: Jamestown, Saint Helena
- Coordinates: 15°55′29.9″S 5°43′04.8″W
- Appeals to: St Helena Court of Appeal

Chief Justice
- Currently: Rupert Jones

The Supreme Court of St Helena together with the St Helena Court of Appeal are the Senior Courts of the British Overseas Territory of Saint Helena, Ascension and Tristan da Cunha.

The Supreme Court of St Helena was first established in 1839

Article 82(3) of the Constitution of Saint Helena, Ascension and Tristan da Cunha provides that "the Supreme Court shall possess and may exercise all the jurisdiction which is vested in, or is capable of being exercised by, His Majesty's High Court of Justice in England."

It is one of four judicial courts that exist in Saint Helena, the other three being the Court of Appeal, the Magistrates' Court and the Juvenile Court. Saint Helena is an overseas territory of the United Kingdom and follows English law in place prior to 2006, as well as legislation from the local legislature. Appeal from the territorial courts lies to the Judicial Committee of the Privy Council in London.

== Chief justices ==
The Chief Justice and other judges are appointed by letters patent on the recommendation of the Governor.

- 1836-1863: William Wilde (1st Chief Justice)
- 1863-1867: William Robert Phelps
- 1867: John Norcross Firmin (acting)
- 1868–1870: Joseph Stone Williams
- c.1874–1875: William Alexander Parker (afterwards Chief Justice of British Honduras, 1875)
- c.1924: Wilberforce John James Arnold (acting)
- 1959: Lionel Brett
- 1983–1992: Sir John Farley Spry
- 1992–2006: Geoffrey William Martin
- 2007–2021: Charles Wareing Ekins
- 2022– 2026 : Rupert Jones
- 2026 - Richard Wright KC

== See also ==
- St Helena Magistrates' Court
- Saint Helena Police Service
