= Royal Saint Helena Police Service =

Police in the overseas territory

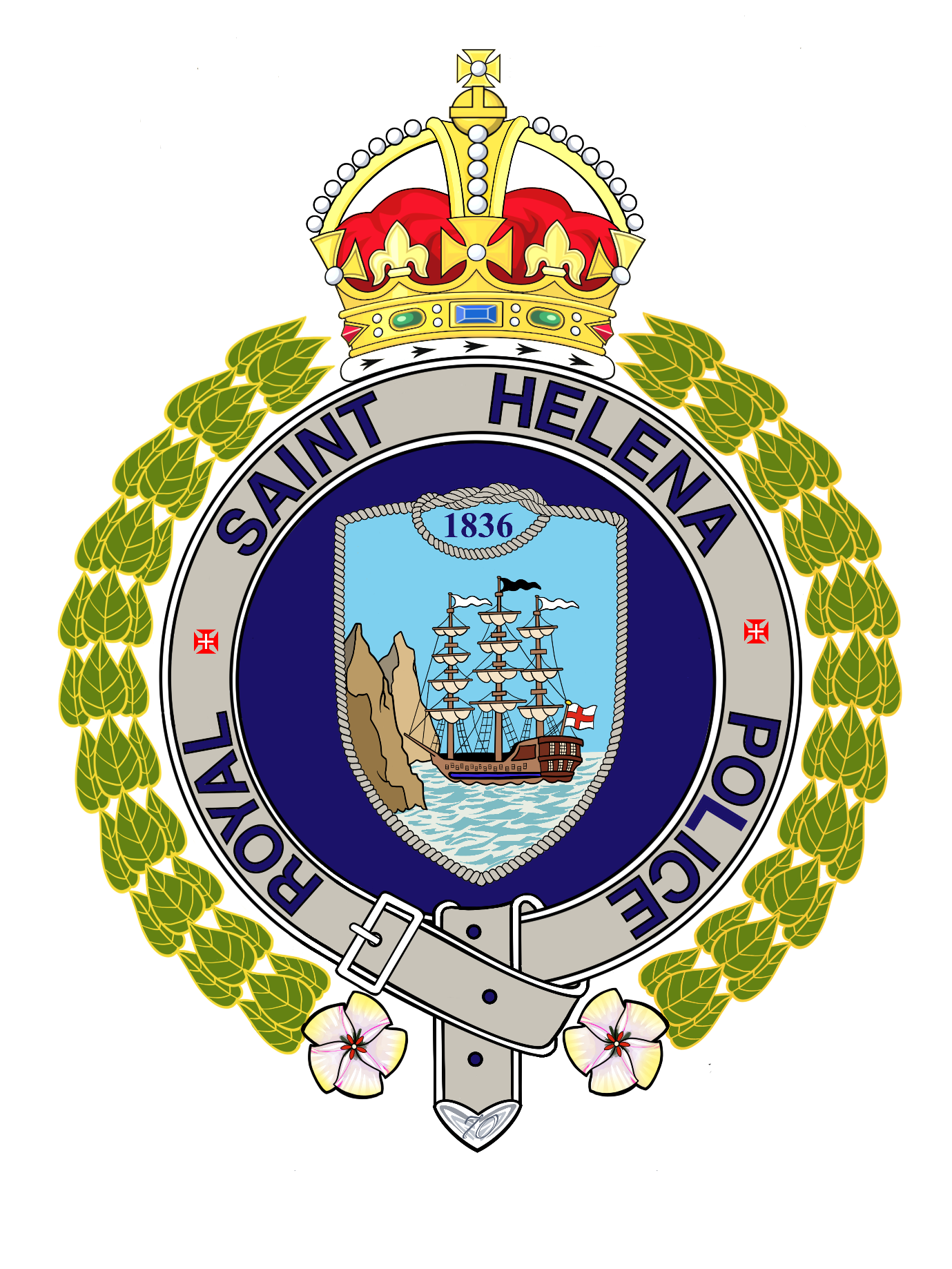
- Crest of the RSHPS

- Flag of Saint Helena
- Abbreviation: RSHPS
- Motto: Protecting and serving our community

Jurisdictional structure
- Operations jurisdiction: Saint Helena, Ascension Island and Tristan da Cunha
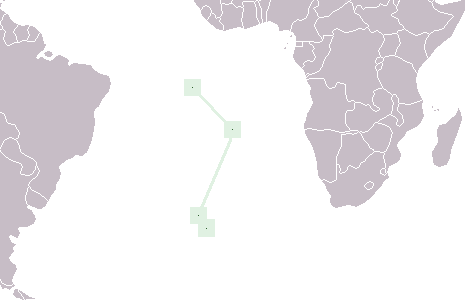
- Map of Royal Saint Helena Police Service's jurisdiction
- Area: 420 km^{2}
- Population: 5,661

Operational structure
- Headquarters: Coleman House, Jamestown, Saint Helena

Facilities
- Stations: 1

Website
- www.sainthelena.gov.sh/portfolios/safety-security-and-home-affairs/police-service/

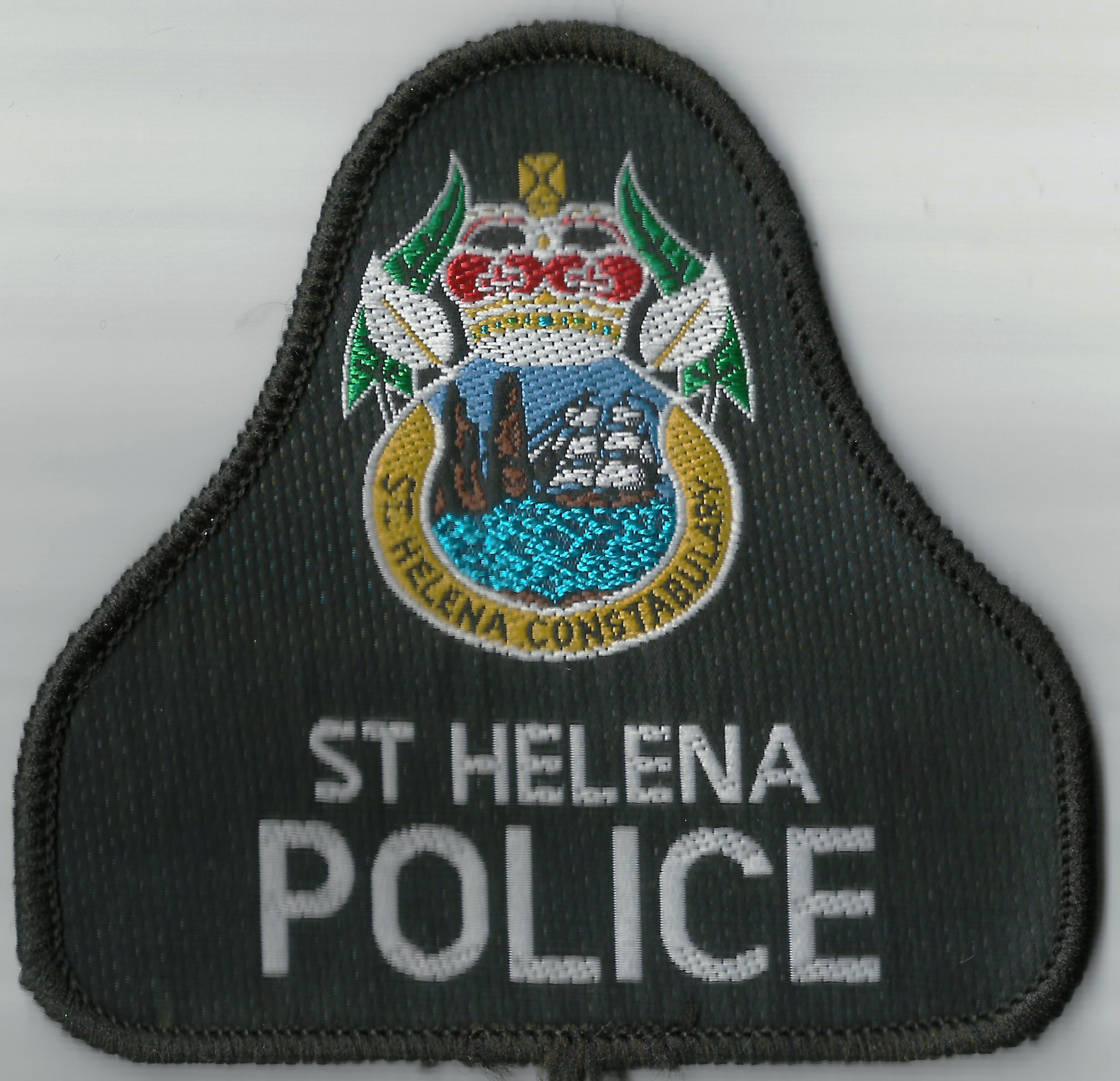
Shoulder patch of the RSHPS

The Royal Saint Helena Police Service, formerly the Saint Helena Police Service, is the local police force for the British overseas territory of Saint Helena, Ascension and Tristan da Cunha, consisting of the South Atlantic islands of Saint Helena, Ascension and the island group of Tristan da Cunha.

The Royal Saint Helena Police Service is part of the Safety, Security and Home Affairs Portfolio which also includes the Fire and Rescue Service, His Majesty's Prison Jamestown, the Immigration Office and the Sea Rescue Service.

== Staffing and resources ==
The service has 30 attested police officers: a head of police, a chief of police, a detective chief inspector, three inspectors, a detective sergeant, four sergeants, three detective constables and sixteen constables.

Including civilians, it has a total staff of 63 on the most populous island of St Helena, with a detachment of five on Ascension Island led by an inspector.

Policing on Tristan da Cunha is undertaken by one full-time police sergeant and three special constables. The current Tristan da Cunha sergeant is Barry Thacker, who was sworn in November 2025. This was historically held by an inspector, most recently inspector Conrad Glass.

Saint Helena has one police station, Coleman House, named after PC Leonard John Coleman who died in the line of duty on 2 December 1982. The Island's only prison - HMP Jamestown - was built in 1827 and refurbished in 2018.

The RSHP has a joint partnership with Hampshire and Isle of Wight Constabulary in the United Kingdom.

=== Constables ===
Officers of the RSHPS are known as constables, as is typical with British police organisations.

The constables are a mixture of UK, South African and local nationals. They receive uniforms and equipment from the UK.

In 2014, they received some uniforms from Sussex Police in the United Kingdom.

=== Officer deaths on duty ===
- PC Leonard John Coleman was killed while attending a domestic incident on 2 December 1982.

== HMP Jamestown ==
Established in 1826 HMP Jamestown provides accommodation for convicted and remanded prisoners and also provides a police custody facility for arrested persons.

HMP Jamestown is a Category B prison holding adult male and female prisoners and young offenders, both convicted and those currently on remand by the courts.

=== Criticisms ===
While prison services on St. Helena adhere to the same high standards as other facilities in the UK, HMP Jamestown cannot fulfill these requirements in some aspects, mainly due to the old building offering only limited space.

It was criticised that the building did not offer modern (or hardly any at all) fire protection and is not barrier-free, making access for visiting wheelchair users impossible.

The cells are overcrowded, not properly ventilated and do not allow sunlight to reach the inmates. There are no sanitation facilities in the cells and prisoners have to use common facilities that are not up to modern standards.

These problems are well known as HMP Jamestown had been declared unfit for further use already in 1850.

Since that time, many suggestions had been made to build a more suitable prison and relocate the old facility, the last plan was for doing so in 2017. However, none of these plans have been followed up properly and today the same facilities that had been declared unsuitable in 1850 are still being used in a rather improvised way.

Recent structural updates to improve the prisons fire safety might indicate that the relocation of the prison is still not planned in the near future.

The prison was widely condemned and deemed to be "unfit for purpose" following an inquiry by the St Helena Equality and Human Rights Commission.

== Immigration office ==
This is the Office in charge of all border control at the Sea & Air Port, passport issuing and nationality matters and is composed of:

- Chief Immigration Officer
- Three Senior Immigration Officers
- Four Immigration Officers

== See also ==
- Saint Helena Supreme Court
- St Helena Magistrates' Court

== Sources ==
1. World Police Encyclopedia, ed. by Dilip K. Das & Michael Palmiotto published by Taylor & Francis, 2004.
2. World Encyclopedia of Police Forces and Correctional Systems, second edition, Gale, 2006.
3. Sullivan, Larry E. Encyclopedia of Law Enforcement. Thousand Oaks: SAGE Publications, 2005.
