= Public holidays in Saint Helena, Ascension and Tristan da Cunha =

This is a list of public holidays in Saint Helena, Ascension and Tristan da Cunha, a British overseas territory in the South Atlantic Ocean consisting of Saint Helena, Ascension Island and Tristan da Cunha.

Date	Name	Notes
January 1	New Year's Day	Public holiday is on 2 January if 1 January is a Sunday; public holiday is on 3 January if 1 January is a Saturday
March or April	Good Friday	
March or April	Easter Monday	
May 21	Saint Helena Day	Saint Helena
May or June	Ascension Day	Ascension Island and Tristan da Cunha only
May or June	Whit Monday	
May or June	Ratting Day	Tristan da Cunha only (date varies each year)
August 14	Anniversary Day	Tristan da Cunha only
Last Monday in August	August Bank Holiday	not observed in Tristan da Cunha
Third Friday in November	King's Birthday	(Charles III's actual birthday is November 14)
December 25	Christmas Day	The public holiday may be on a different day — see Boxing Day#Date
December 26	Boxing Day	If the 26 December is a Sunday, then Boxing Day is held on 27 December; the public holiday may be on a different day — see Boxing Day#Date

== Local custom and variance ==
Saint Helena has a total of 9 public holidays, Ascension Island a total of 10 days, and Tristan da Cunha a total of 11 days.

St. Helena's feast day is celebrated as the island of Saint Helena was discovered on the feast day and is named in her honour; it is a public holiday on St Helena only. Ascension Island was discovered on Ascension Day in 1503; it is celebrated on that island and also in Tristan da Cunha. In the archipelago of Tristan da Cunha, Anniversary Day celebrates the day on which the islands were formally annexed to the British Empire in 1816.

Ratting Day is a local observance on Tristan da Cunha island and its date is declared annually by the Chief Islander; it can be moved at short notice depending on weather conditions.

== Christian observance ==
The territory has a largely Christian population and two further dates are therefore locally notable in the calendar: Easter Sunday and Whit Sunday (the Pentecost), both of which (along with their associated public holidays of Good Friday, Easter Monday, Ascension Day and Whit Monday) vary each year.

== See also ==
- Public holidays in the United Kingdom
- Bank holiday
