= Communications in Saint Helena, Ascension and Tristan da Cunha =

Messenger and data services in the mid-Atlantic British territories

Saint Helena, Ascension and Tristan da Cunha is a British Overseas Territory in the South Atlantic, consisting of the island of Saint Helena, Ascension Island, and the archipelago of Tristan da Cunha including Gough Island. Their communications provision includes dedicated radio and television stations, and telecommunications infrastructure.

Much of the preceding telecommunications infrastructure between Saint Helena and Ascension was laid in 1899 by the Eastern Telegraph Company, later Cable & Wireless plc and Sure South Atlantic, as part of the British need to track the Second Boer War.

== Saint Helena ==
Communications services in Saint Helena are provided by Sure South Atlantic (Sure SA), providing landline (POTS), mobile (2G/4G), internet (ADSL2), television (DVB-T2) and international connectivity. They have an exclusive license from the St Helena Government to operate the aforementioned services, with the current licence running to 1 July 2025. All of St Helena's international connectivity was by satellite until the activation of the Equiano submarine cable in October 2023. New telecoms legislation and new license terms are being drafted by the government, with the arrival of subsea cable access. Cable and Wireless was the license holder from 1989 to 2013. Prior to 1989 telecoms were operated by the government.

There are three radio stations broadcasting in St Helena as of 2023 and two weekly newspapers, The Sentinel and the St Helena Independent.

Telecom services in St Helena are comparatively expensive, for example, all TV channels are encrypted and a subscription costs amount to more than one tenth of an average worker's salary.

=== Radio ===
There are three radio stations in St Helena as of 2023, all broadcasting on FM. All are also available on Internet radio.

- SAMS Radio 1
- BBC World Service (provided by SAMS)
- Saint FM Community Radio

South Atlantic Media Services (SAMS), supported by the St Helena Government, broadcasts two FM stations: SAMS Radio 1, providing locally produced news, talk and music programming; SAMS also rebroadcasts the BBC World Service. SAMS also produces a weekly newspaper, The Sentinel.

Saint FM Community Radio broadcasts on FM. The station is legally a company registered by guarantee and is owned by its members; Anyone who wishes to can become a member. The station's sister newspaper is the St Helena Independent.

Previously, Radio St Helena, which started operations on Christmas Day 1967, provided a local radio service that had a range of about 60 miles (100 km) from the island, and also broadcast internationally on Shortwave Radio (11,092.5 kHz) on one day a year. The station presented news, features and music in collaboration with its sister newspaper, the St Helena Herald. It closed on 25 December 2012 to make way for a new three-channel FM service, also funded by St. Helena Government and run by the South Atlantic Media Services (formerly St. Helena Broadcasting (Guarantee) Corporation). Saint FM, the precursor of Saint FM community radio, was launched in January 2005 and closed on 21 December 2012. It was relayed in Ascension Island and was not government funded. It broadcast news, features and music in collaboration with its sister newspaper, the St Helena Independent (which continues). As of 1997, there were 3,000 radios in the area.

Occasional amateur radio operations also occur on the island. The ITU prefix used is ZD7.

=== Television ===
Sure SA offers television for the island via 17 digital encrypted DVB-T2 channels, which rebroadcast a compilation of British and South African programmes provided by MultiChoice. The feed signal from MultiChoice DStv in South Africa is received by a satellite dish at Bryant's Beacon from Intelsat 20 and Intelsat 36 in the K_{u} band.

Television services first arrived in 1995 using 3 analogue encrypted TV channels, rebroadcasting a variety of foreign content from satellite.

In 2001, channel 1 was timeshared between feeds of M-Net and SuperSport 1, while channels 2 and 3 were fixed (BBC World and Discovery Channel respectively). Before the termination of analogue service, channel 1 timeshared four channels: BBC Entertainment, BBC World, Disney Channel and Universal Channel; channel 2 being SuperSport and BBC World News and channel 3 carrying the audio feed of the BBC World Service.

The current digital broadcasting network using the DVB-T2 standard was installed on the island in late 2011, replacing the old analogue system. The feed signal is received by a satellite dish at Bryant's Beacon. A local television channel was in operation from 2015 to 2017 by SAMS, consisting of a weekly news bulletin. As of 1997, there were 2,000 television sets in the territory.

=== Telecommunications ===
Sure South Atlantic Ltd provide the telecommunications service in the territory. They provide landline (POTS), mobile (2G/4G), internet (ADSL2), television (DVB-T2) and international connectivity. They have an exclusive license from the St Helena Government to operate the aforementioned services, with the current licence running to 1 July 2025. All of St Helena's international connectivity was by satellite until the activation of the Equiano submarine cable in October 2023. Sure SA operate an on island fibre backbone connecting most exchanges, cell sites and important institutions, with microwave links providing access to some areas. The access network is entirely based on copper, besides some important institutions.

The St Helena has contracted Maestro Technologies to build and deploy a full-fibre access network to the island, with fixed wireless access serving the most remote places. The network was originally intended to be completed by the end of 2023, however has been delayed to an unknown date. Preparatory works have begun, however the main deployment has not.

==== History ====
The island was first connected by a subsea telegraph cable in 1899 to Ascension Island and South Africa, forming part of the All Red Line. The government took over the telephone system in 1953. A radiotelephone link is established to Ascension Island in 1957, and in 1967 to South Africa. An automatic telephone exchange was installed in 1983. A satellite ground station with a 7.6-metre satellite dish installed in 1989 at The Briars, coinciding with Cable & Wireless taking over operation of the telephone network. This allowed international direct dial services for the first time. In 1999 the first local dial-up service was introduced, followed by ADSL service in 2007. The first fiber-optic link was installed on the island in August 2011, gradually expanding the backbone to most areas of the island by 2020. Mobile telephony was first introduced in 2015 using a mix of 2G and 4G technology. The island was subject to sun outages at certain times of year, as a result of satellite only access.

St Helena's first submarine fibre cable, Google's Equiano cable, was landed in 2021 and became active in 2023.

==== Telephone service ====
As of 2009 there were 2,900 main telephone lines in use on St Helena. Since 2006 it shares its international calling code +290 with Tristan da Cunha. Since October 2013 telephone numbers are 5 digits long. Numbers start with 1–9, with 8xxxx being reserved for Tristan da Cunha numbers and 22xxx for Jamestown.

==== Mobile service ====
A 2G/4G mobile telephone network is provided by Sure SA and reaches 98% of the population.

Mobile service was first launched in September 2015, following an agreement signed between the St Helena Government and Cable & Wireless South Atlantic (now Sure South Atlantic Ltd) in July 2012.A GSM/3G network was originally planned. Installation began in April 2014, however the contracted network equipment supplier, Altobridge, went into receivership, the procurement process had to be restarted, postponing the launch date. The deployed network, after the second procurement, added 4G connectivity and is based on network equipment from Canadian Star Solutions International Inc. providing GSM-900 and LTE band 3 (1800 MHz) and Primal Technologies providing Advance Pay/Prepaid, SMSC, Voicemail, USSD, IVR, CTS service. The cellular network uses the MCC/MNC tuple 658–01.

==== Internet ====
ADSL2+ broadband internet service is provided by Sure SA. Speeds between 5 and 20 Mbit/s are offered, with lower tiers having data caps of 30-60 GB; higher tiers are uncapped. There are few public Wi-Fi hotspots in Jamestown, which are also operated by Sure South Atlantic Ltd. As of 2023, the island is connected by the Google Equiano submarine cable, with a lit bandwidth of 100 Gbit to Portugal, and 10 Gbit/s of internet capacity. There are plans to deploy an island-wide full-fibre access network to better utilise the submarine capacity.

Until 2023, St Helena's international access was via satellite link. Internet and telecom services on the island were severely restricted and expensive, with the top-tier internet plan costing £160 with a data cap of 31 GB and a speed of 2 Mbit/s. In 2018, the entire island shared an estimated 50 Mbit/s of bandwidth, with latency reported up to 600-700ms. Diane Selkirk of The Independent wrote that "internet is slow and costly enough that only the most dedicated teenager keeps up on celebrity gossip."

As of 2021, the territory had 1068 internet users; there were 6,873 internet hosts as of 2010.

==== Submarine cable link ====
As of 2023, St Helena has a single submarine cable connection, the Google Equiano cable. The cable was landed in 2021 and services over the cable were activated in October 2023. Prior to the cable St Helena's international access was only by satellite. Latency reduced from 657ms to 131ms after the activation of the cable, as well as providing bandwidth capacity orders of magnitude higher than before.

Since 2012 a campaign called Move This Cable – Connect St Helena! lobbied for submarine cable access. Specifically they lobbied for branch of the planned South Atlantic Express (SAEx) submarine cable to land on St Helena. On 27 October 2017 the St Helena Government announced the signing of a Memorandum of Understanding with SAEx to provide a branching spur to St Helena from the South Atlantic Express submarine cable between South Africa and South America. However the SAEx project never came to fruition.

In July 2019, the St Helena Government obtained funding from the European Development Fund and issued a letter of intent to Google to connect St Helena through a 1140 km long branch from the company's Equiano submarine cable. The cable was landed in St Helena in 2021 and services became active in October 2023.

==== Satellite Earth station ====
As of 2023, OneWeb is currently constructing a satellite earth station at Deadwood Plain, to support operations over the South Atlantic Ocean using capacity from the newly inaugurated submarine cable.

The St Helena Government hopes to attract operators of satellite ground stations to the island who would lease capacity on the planned submarine cable for backhauling and so contribute to the operational costs of the latter, with a project launched in February 2018 seeing to this purpose. Satellite ground stations on St Helena could support communications with satellites in low Earth orbit, including those in polar, equatorial and inclined orbit and with high-throughput satellites in medium Earth as well as Geostationary orbit.

== Ascension ==
=== Telecommunications ===
Ascension Island Mobile, a mobile network owned by the Ascension Island Government, launched services in March 2026. This followed notice by Sure SA Ltd of their intent to cease telecommunications operations on the island. Sure SA previously provided a range of telecom services in Ascension Island, including telephone, internet and mobile services. The island does not have submarine connectivity. In 2023, Sure SA ADSL services were available with a maximum speed of 1.5 Mbit/s with a 14 GB data cap.

Since 2012 Ascension has a cellular network based on the GSM standard which covers Georgetown, Wideawake Airfield, Travellers Hill and Two Boats Village. Initially, services were not marketed locally but instead only offered to visitors using their home operators' international roaming service. Local 2G and 4G services were launched in 2016.

Separately, Ascension hosts British, European and US communications equipment for satellites, telescopes, spacecraft tracking and signals intelligence, and was historically an important mid-atlantic communications hub.

== Tristan da Cunha ==
=== Telecommunications ===
The island is linked internationally through the Foreign and Commonwealth Office Telecommunications Network. All homes in Tristan have landline telephones. BFBS and radio are retransmitted on the island. Internet access has been available since 1998, accessible in schools, government offices and through a public internet cafe opened in 2006. The connection was initially extremely unreliable, connecting through a 64 kbit/s satellite phone connection provided by Inmarsat. In 2006, a larger satellite dish was installed and provided 3072 kbit/s of bandwidth. In 2013, the connection was upgraded and again in 2020, it was reported that the island's internet was able to support a video call. After the 2019 storm, it was reported a municipal wifi network was being deployed for residents by Vodafone.

A Starlink connection was activated on the island in September 2024.

As of 2023, there is not yet any mobile telephone coverage on the islands.

Although Tristan da Cunha has an allocated telephone numbering range of +290 8xxxx, shared with St Helena, telephones in Tristan da Cunha use a London 020 numbering range, meaning that numbers are accessed via the UK telephone numbering plan.

=== Amateur radio ===
Amateur radio operator groups sometimes conduct DX-peditions on the island. One group operated as station ZD9ZS in September–October 2014.

== Meteorological stations ==
South Africa maintains a staffed meteorological station on Gough Island; on Saint Helena island, there is an automatic weather station at Longwood and another station at Broad Bottom. Ascension Island has four meteorological stations: in the Airhead, Georgetown, Travellers and Residency.

== See also ==
- Saint Helena, Ascension and Tristan da Cunha#Communications
- Transport on Saint Helena
- Category:Radio stations in Saint Helena
