= Television in the Falkland Islands =

Television arrived to the Falkland Islands in 1982 during the Falklands War, but did not launch a permanent service until 1986, under the aegis of the British Forces Broadcasting Service/Services Sound and Vision Corporation. For many years, from 1993 until 2023, the islands had KTV Ltd., a subscription television operator. Falkland Islands Television opened in 2011.

== History ==
Television was being assessed before the war, when Marko Zuvic first tested a television service around 1981, upon returning from Punta Arenas, where he assisted the installation of an MMDS system there. A feasibility study was presented to governor Rex Hunt, but the war in 1982 complicated things.

The first television broadcasts on the islands took place on 13 April 1982, early in the Falklands War, with LU 78 Canal 7 Islas Malvinas, dependent on ATC, the Argentine state channel. Broadcasts were held two hours an evening, in Spanish and English, from 7 to 9pm. ATC was responsible for some of its equipment and programming, while the 100-watt transmitter was donated from Canal 12 from Posadas.

Once the war ended, television was suspended and was only restored on 4 December 1986 with the installation of a local SSVC Television station. The station was outside of SSVC's primary European catchment area, meaning that it received a block of videotaped programming, initially running for three hours; by 1997, on a two-week delay. That Christmas, BFBS (formerly SSVC) started delivering a live feed from London to the Falklands. An illegal relay at Sapper Hill was switched off in 1988 due to copyright problems with U.S. programming seen on the channel.

KTV Ltd. started broadcasting its MMDS service in 1993, delivering three channels (all from Turner), Cartoon Network, TNT and CNN International. Over time, the amount of channels grew, mostly after the arrival of downlink from digital sources. The first live television programme from the Falklands was also from KTV, from the 1982 Monument, covering the Liberation Day Service of Remembrance on 14 June 1997.

Digital terrestrial broadcasting was approved in 2009, which implied the terrestrial launch of BFBS 2. In September 2010, KTV announced that it would set up Falkland Islands Television. In March 2011, FITV announced that it would begin operating on 1 April, with a staff of just two people.

BFBS provides terrestrial and streaming services (using the local broadband network) in association with the Falkland Islands Government, having signed a memorandum of understanding with FITV and FIRS in 2020. KTV ceased operating in 2024.
