= Transport of Saint Helena, Ascension and Tristan da Cunha =

This article deals with traffic in Saint Helena, Ascension and Tristan da Cunha, that is all forms of traffic in the British overseas territory of Saint Helena, Ascension and Tristan da Cunha.

== Saint Helena ==
=== Road traffic ===
The island of Saint Helena has a 138-kilometre-long (86 mi) road network, consisting of 118 kilometres (73 mi) of paved and 20 kilometres (12 mi) of unpaved road. Most roads are single-lane, and uphill traffic has a right of way. A general speed limit of 30 miles per hour (48 km/h) applies to the entire island. On Saint Helena there is a public bus network that in January 2015 served five routes, but was expanded in September 2015, March 2016 and October 2017.

=== Shipping ===
The M/V Helena serves the island from Cape Town on a monthly basis. The ship was built in 1998 in China and can take 4,924 tonnes (4,846 long tons; 5,428 short tons) of cargo, or 218 TEU.

The M/V Helena previously carried passengers.

Saint Helena has a feeder and a harbour:

- Jamestown (feeder)
- Rupert's Wharf in the Rupert's Valley (harbour)

Between 1990, and the opening of airport to commercial passenger traffic, RMS St Helena (1989) provided passenger travel service.

Saint Helena was previously served by ships on the Union Castle Line, and by a previous RMS St Helena (1963) from 1978 to 1990.

=== Air traffic ===
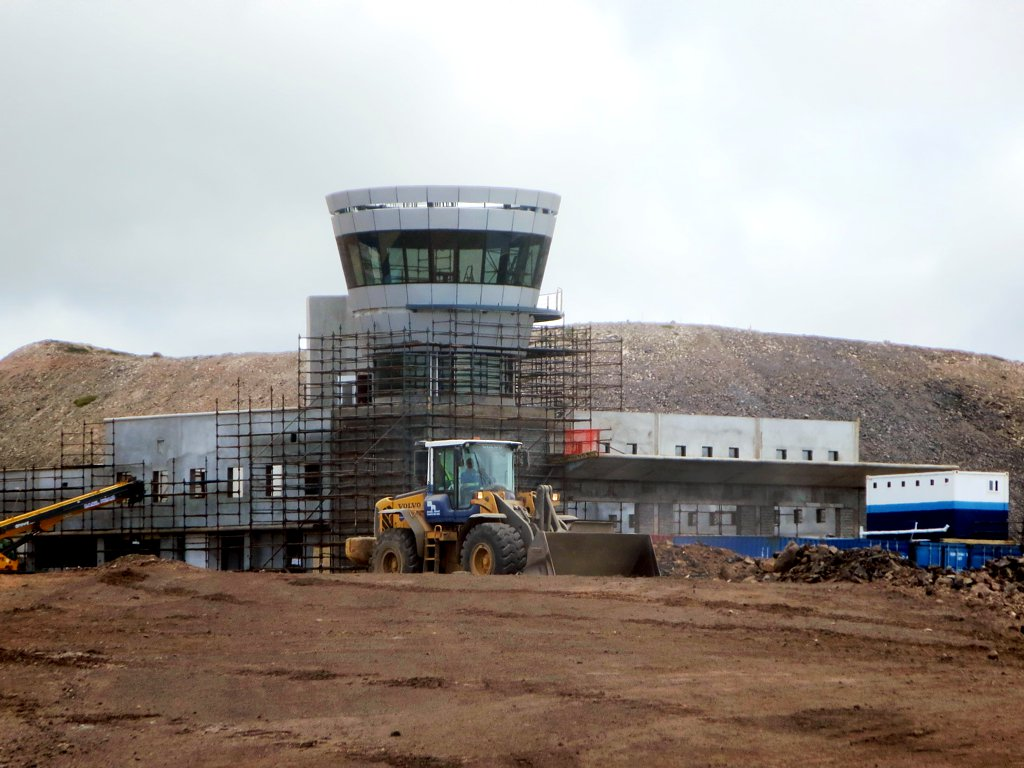
Airport Saint Helena

With the opening of Saint Helena Airport, scheduled flights have been operated since 14 October 2017, twelve years after the British government agreed to fund it in order to encourage tourism to the island.

The new airport is served weekly from Johannesburg (South Africa). During the pandemic 2020-2021 this service were temporarily cancelled and instead monthly flights operated from London (UK), but from 2022 there were flights from Johannesburg again, and by 2023 the flights came twice weekly in the summer season.

=== Rail traffic ===
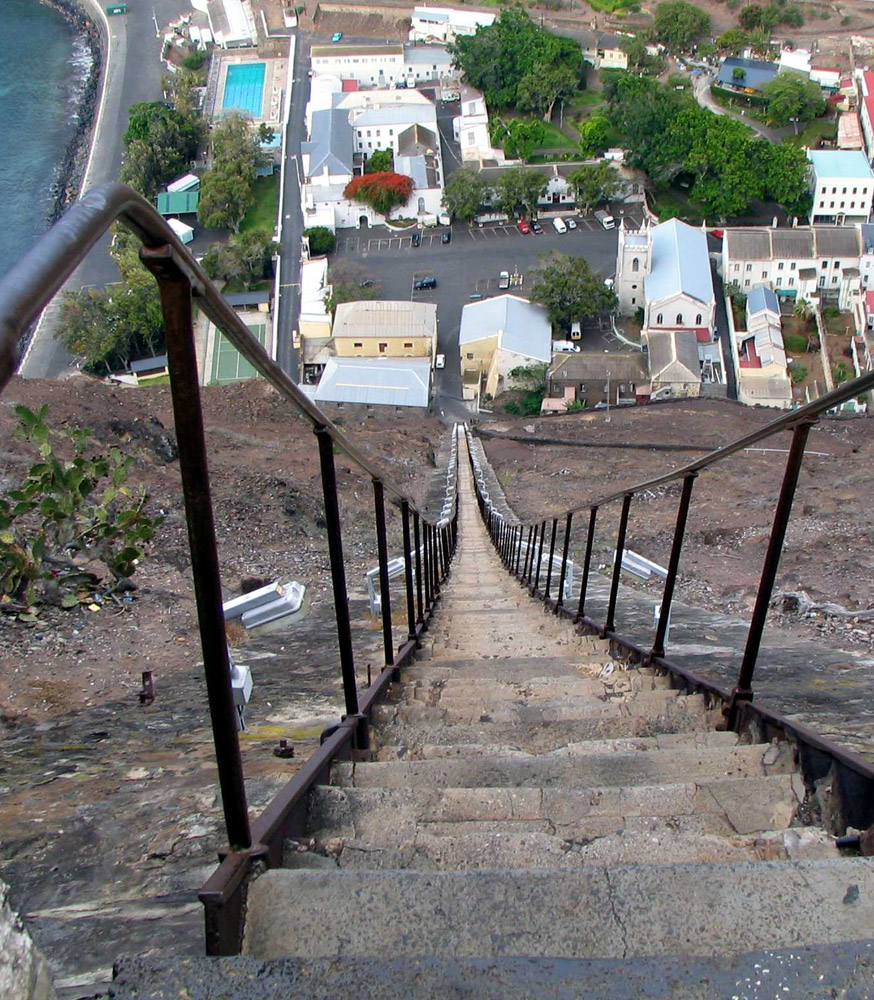
Ladder Hill Railway

In 1829, the Saint Helena Railway Company opened a horse-drawn railway from Jamestown to Half Tree Hollow, which was also known as Ladder Hill Railway, or Jacob's Ladder. The main purpose was to transport goods from the port of Jamestown to the higher houses. The service was discontinued in 1871 because it was damaged by termites.

Another small rail network was built for the seawater desalination plant in Ruperts. Details of the track are not known.

== Ascension ==
=== Road traffic ===
On Ascension there is a road network of 40 kilometres (25 mi), which is continuously paved. The public bus transport network has four stops (as of 2014).

=== Shipping ===
Ascension has a feeder in the island's capital Georgetown. The port was modernized in 2011 with a new crane, among other things.

=== Air traffic ===
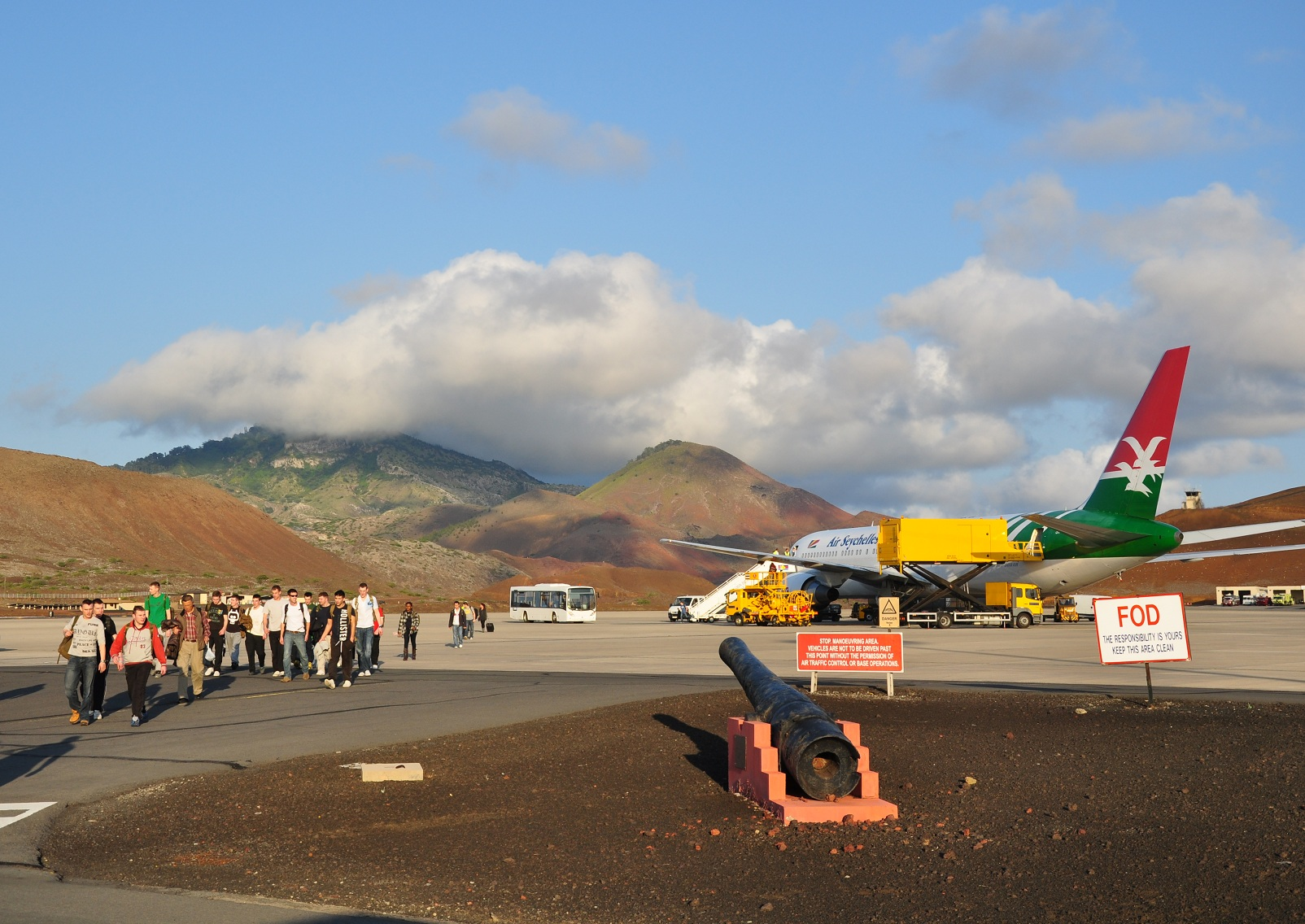
Wideawake airfield, Ascension

With Wideawake Airfield, Ascension has had an airport since 1943. It is primarily used for military purposes, but is also served by monthly scheduled services from Saint Helena.

Previously civilian passengers were permitted on flights to and from RAF Brize Norton in England.

== Tristan da Cunha ==
=== Road traffic ===
Tristan da Cunha has a road network of 20 kilometres (12 mi), half of which is paved or half unpaved. The island has probably the smallest public bus network in the world. The fleet of minibuses is available to pensioners free of charge.

=== Shipping ===
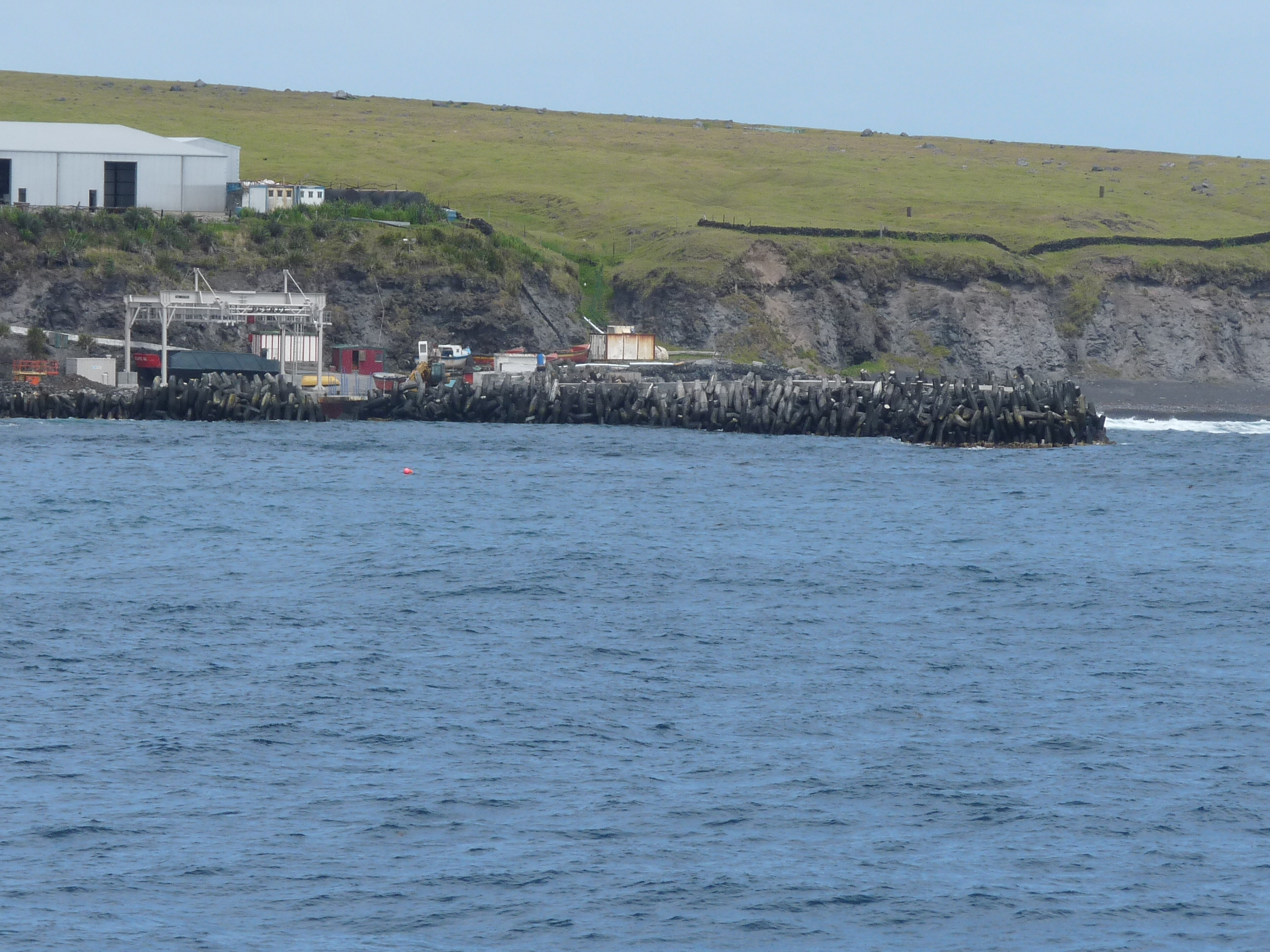
Calshot Harbour, Tristan da Cunha

The shipping traffic is of outstanding importance for Tristan da Cunha, which has no airfield. All goods and travellers can only reach the island by sea. Tristan da Cunha is approached irregularly from Cape Town by MFV Edinburgh, M/V Baltic Trader, and S. A. Agulhas II.

Tristan da Cunha has with the Calshot Harbour a port in Edinburgh of the Seven Seas. The port was comprehensively renovated at the beginning of 2017. It is 2 meters deep and takes only smaller boats. All larger ships have to stay offshore and both passengers and cargo have to be transferred to small boats.

=== Air traffic ===
Tristan da Cunha has no airport or airstrip of any kind.

The S.A Agulhas II has a helicopter which is used for transport between the ship and land. The other ships regularly visiting Tristan da Cunha do not have that, and transport ashore is done with small boats which requires waves not to be too large.

== See also ==
- Saint Helena, Ascension and Tristan da Cunha#Communications
- Communications in Saint Helena, Ascension and Tristan da Cunha
