= Radio Saint Helena =

Radio station on island of Saint Helena

Radio Saint Helena (call-sign: ZHH) was a local radio station serving the South Atlantic island of Saint Helena. Broadcasting on an AM frequency of 1548 kHz (194 m), the station was audible within a range of about 100 km from the island.

The organisation which ran the service, St Helena News Media Services, also produced a weekly newspaper, the St Helena Herald. The offices were located at Broadway House, Jamestown, whilst the station's broadcasts were radiated from a transmitter in St Paul's. The first broadcast was on Christmas Day 1967, broadcasting on 1511 kHz until 1978.

Radio St Helena also broadcast internationally on one day each year – on 11.0925 MHz shortwave – using the call-sign ZHH-50. Many of the station's regular presenters took part in this event, known as "Radio St Helena Day", thereby enjoying the experience of broadcasting to audiences all around the world.

In March 2012 St Helena News Media Services was dissolved, and the final edition of the Herald was published on 9 March 2012. The company was replaced by the St Helena Broadcasting Corporation (SHBC), which was to be funded by the island's government. SHBC was also to publish a weekly newspaper, and run three FM radio stations, one of them a relay of the BBC World Service. The privately owned station Saint FM declined to join the new enterprise.

Radio St Helena closed down at midnight on Christmas Day, 25 December 2012. This, following the earlier closure of Saint FM on 21 December, left Saint Helena with no broadcast radio service at all until SAMS Radio 1 was launched on 13 February 2013.
