= Ruperts, Saint Helena =

Ruperts
- Village
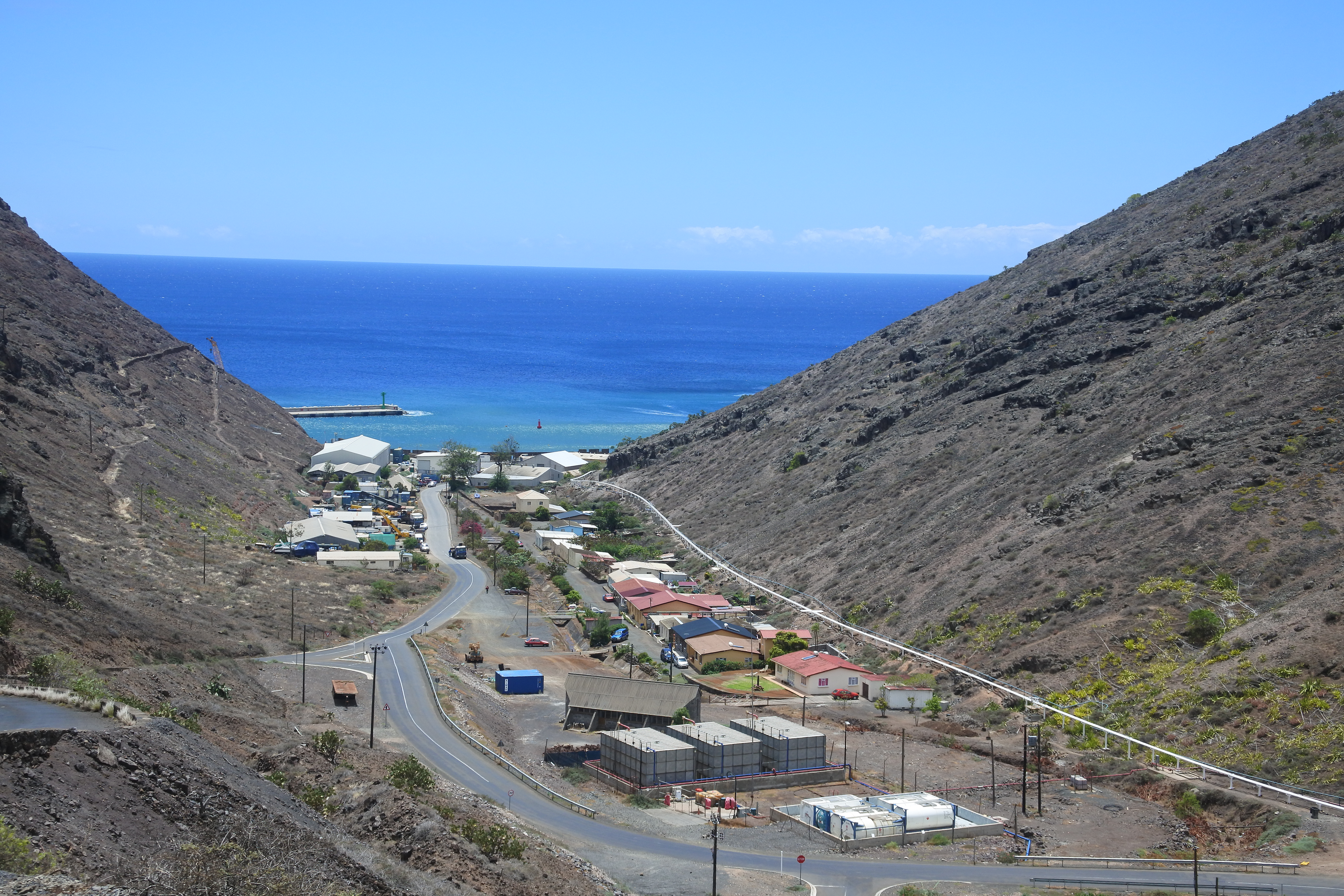
- View of Rupert's Bay
- Interactive map of Ruperts
- Coordinates: 15°55′10.9″S 5°42′44.0″W
- Sovereign state: United Kingdom
- British overseas territory: Saint Helena, Ascension and Tristan da Cunha
- Island: Saint Helena
- District: Jamestown
- Time zone: UTC+0 (GMT)
- Area code: +44

Ruperts, also written as Rupert's, is a village in the island of Saint Helena, in Saint Helena, Ascension and Tristan da Cunha, an overseas territory in the South Atlantic Ocean. It is a waterfront settlement located within the island's Jamestown district. It features a valley settlement with infrastructure including a major commercial port, power station, and fuel installations.

== History ==
The name likely refers to Prince Rupert of the Rhine, who landed here in the 17th century during his journey back from India. In 1652, Dutch captain Jan van Riebeeck documented that Rupert used it as a base for his piracy activity. In the 19th century, the valley housed thousands of Africans who were rescued from slave ships by the Royal Navy, whose mass graves were discovered during excavations. In the early 20th century, it housed Boer prisoners of war during the Second Boer War. Later, it hosted a leper hospital from 1909 to 1955.

== Geography ==
Ruperts belongs to the district of Jamestown. The settlement is composed of Rupert's Valley in between two hills, and Rupert's Wharf by the sea in front of Rupert's Bay. The rocky shoreline with a small sandy beach transitions inland into a narrow valley, rising steeply to rugged hills. The valley is sparsely populated with and a census data showed 90 inhabitants in the village. The surrounding seabed supports various biofauna, with green turtles nesting on the beach.

== Infrastructure ==
The valley hosts the island's power station (diesel generators) and bulk fuel storage facilities. It also hosts the island's animal quarantine station since 1999. The Haul Road was built for supply transport for a new planned airport, linking Jamestown to Ruperts. A narrow-gauge railway served an early 20th‑century desalination plant, which no longer exists.

The settlement hosts a commercial port, and a wharf, which was opened in 2016 and became operational from 2020 after rock stabilization works. The wharf is the main facility to receive large cargo ships on Saint Helena. It allows ships of up to 118 metres (387 ft) length and 7 metres (23 ft) draft.

== Gallery ==
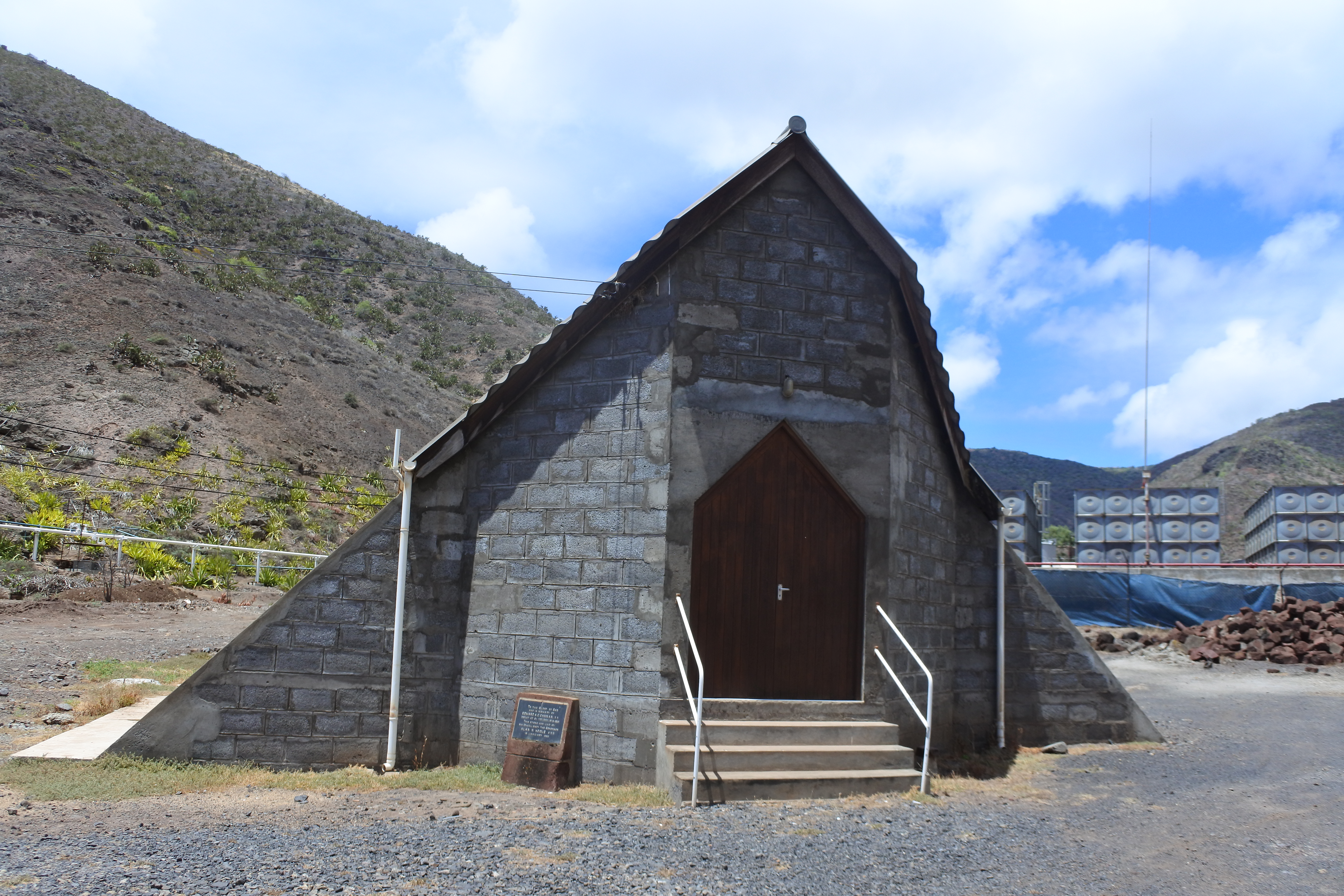
Rupert's Bay Church

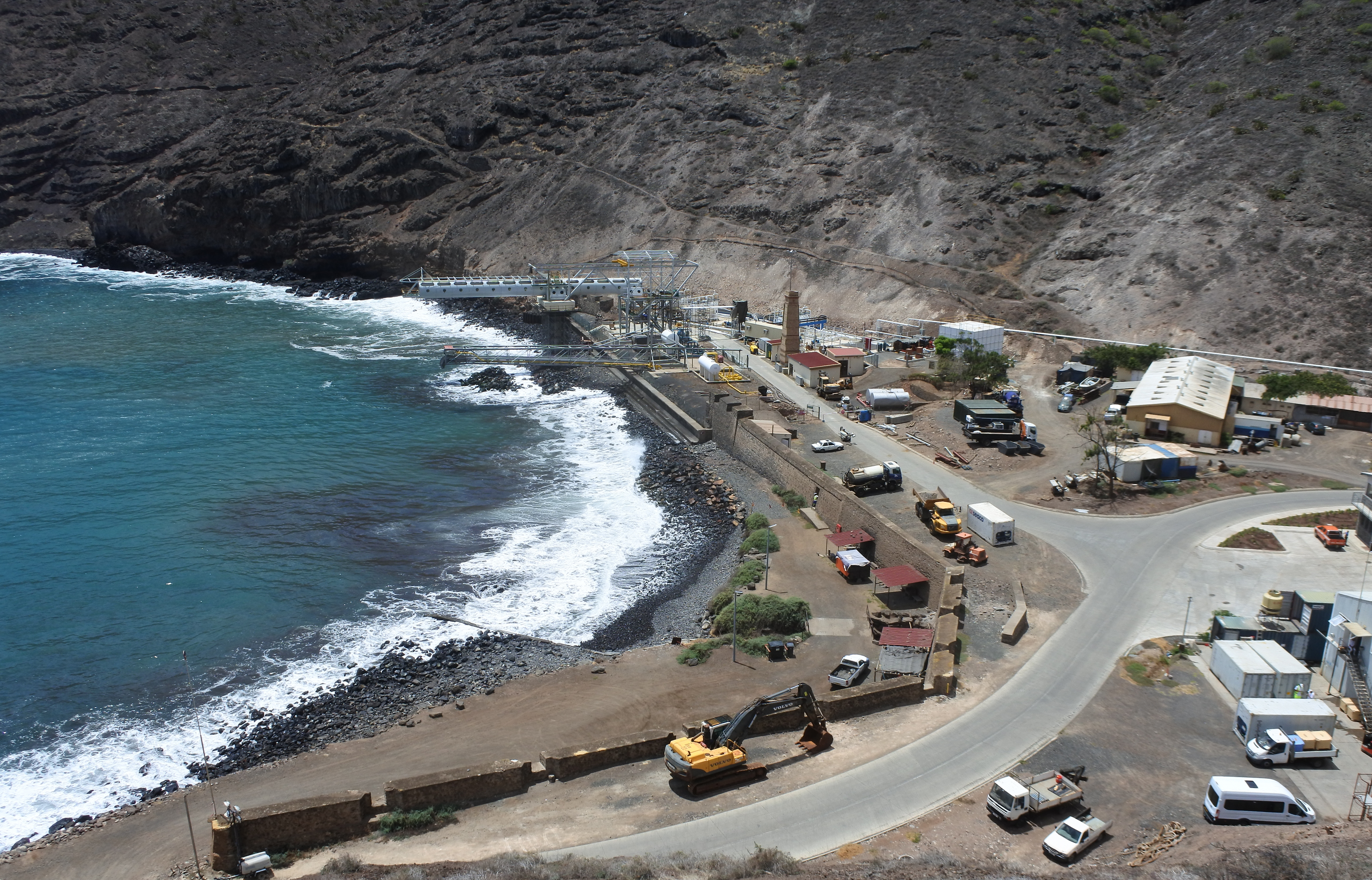
Rupert's Wharf

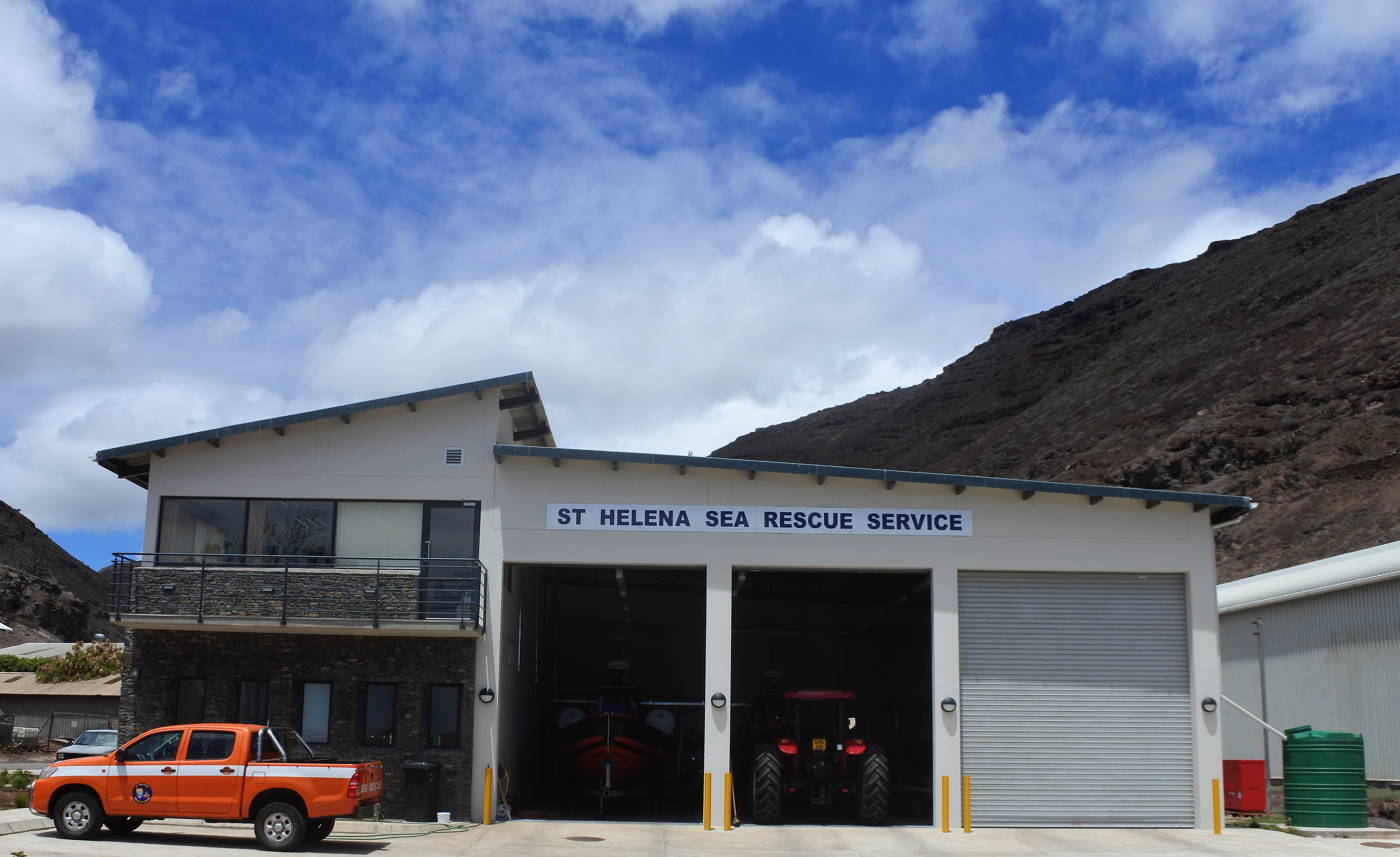
Sea Rescue Service

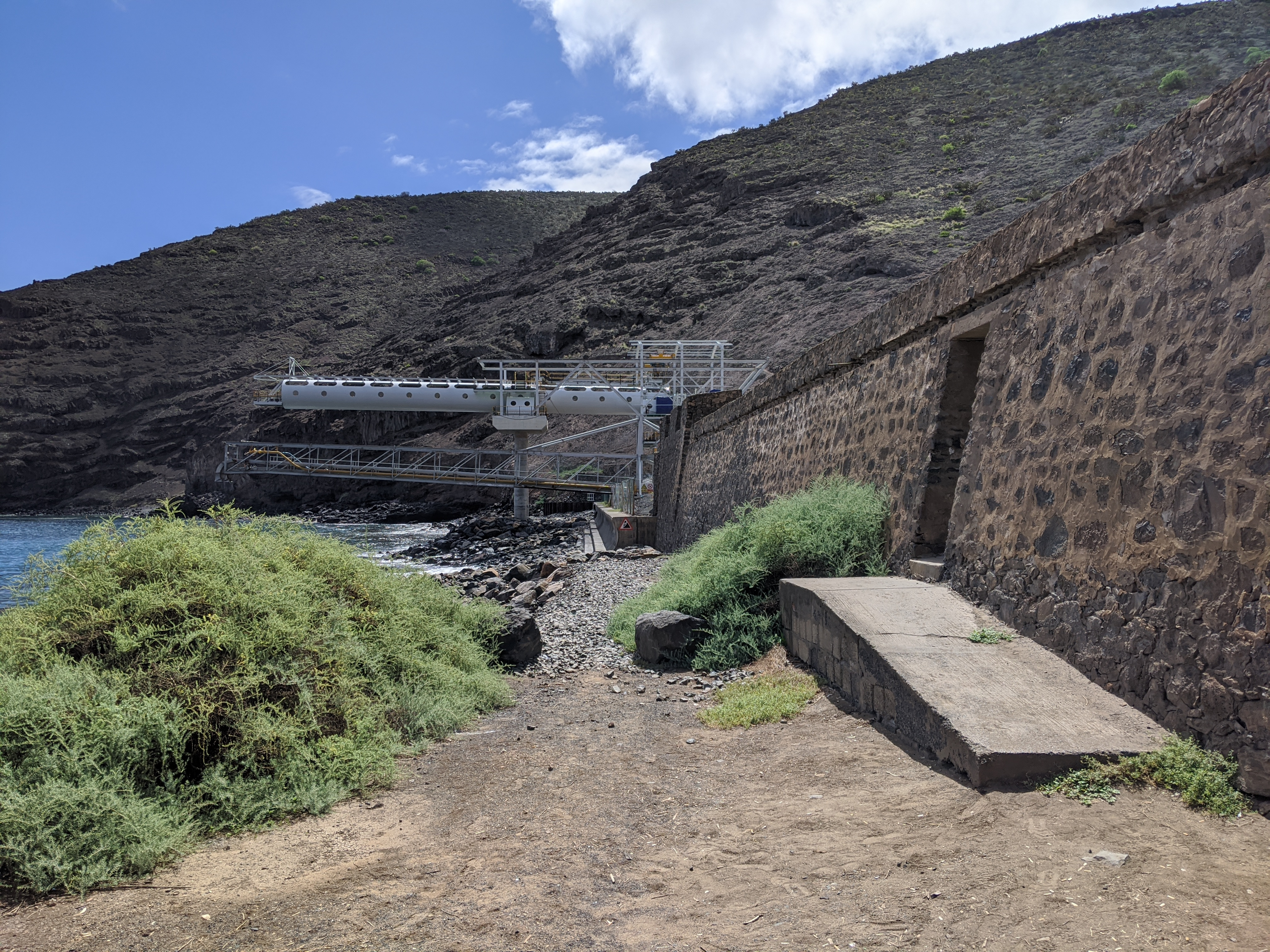
Rupert harbour

== See also ==
- Jacob's Ladder (Saint Helena)
- List of towns in Saint Helena, Ascension and Tristan da Cunha
