= KTV Ltd. =

Satellite television and radio service in the Falkland Islands

- Company type: Digital TV service
- Industry: Communications & Broadcasting
- Founded: 1980
- Headquarters: Stanley, Falkland Islands
- Key people: Mario, Sharon
- Products: Digital TV & Radio Services
- Owner: Mario Zuvic, Sharon Zuvic
- Website: http://www.ktv.co.fk

KTV Ltd. was a DVB-T SD and HD encrypted UHF TV and radio service operating in Stanley, capital of the Falkland Islands, and also in part of the Camp. Offering up to 56 TV and radio channels, the monthly charge for the service starts from £36. Founded in 1980 by Sharon and Mario Zuvic Bulic, KTV Ltd. receives channels from the UK, the US, Saint Helena Island and Chile and rebroadcasts them to subscribers in the Falkland Islands. KTV Ltd. cooperates with a number of other small radio broadcasting companies in other British overseas territories, notably Saint FM in St Helena, the Falkland Islands Radio Service (FIRS), and Myriam's Country.

KTV has a monopoly on pay-TV services in the islands; the passing of a Broadcasting Ordinance in 2004 aimed at countering the importing of illegal decoders brought in from mainland South America.

== History ==
Marko Zuvic first tested a television service around 1981, upon returning from Punta Arenas, where he assisted the installation of an MMDS system there. A feasibility study was presented to governor Rex Hunt, but the war in 1982 complicated things.

The company was formally founded in 1993 by Marko and his wife Sharon. The company started with three channels, Cartoon Network, TNT and CNN International. These channels had the strongest signal available to the Falkland Islands at the time. Since these channels were relayed from analogue satellites, its reception during bad weather would be subject to interference. The transmitting equipment was set up locally during evenings and weekends. The channel line-up later grew with the arrival of ESPN Latin America; by the time they were carrying the channel, they had acquired their first factory-built transmitter, followed by the arrivals of HBO and Discovery Channel. They were also the first MMDS system in the region to carry BBC World, once the channel was made available for interested providers in South America. With the arrival of signals sourced from digital satellites, channels such as People+Arts, Warner Channel, Sony Entertainment Television, The History Channel and, by 2006, Nickelodeon and VH1, were added.

On 14 June 1997, it made its first live outside broadcast, from the 1982 Monument, covering the Liberation Day Service of Remembrance.

In 1999, in conjunction with the launch of KTV's division Radio Nova, it started relaying the BBC World Service on the FM band (106.5), alongside the existing AM radio relay owned by FIRS. Around 2004, it also added relays of Deutsche Welle on 101.1, gaining notoriety among locals for its news and science programmes, as well as classical music on weekends.

KTV Radio Nova Saint FM banner

On 1 September 2006, Saint FM from Saint Helena was added to KTV and on FM radio. Ahead of its launch, it had received letters from the island's diaspora in the Falklands. Its line-up was changed to accommodate timezone differences between territories.

In September 2010, it announced that it would set up a local television station, Falkland Islands Television, alongside Stanley Services.

The company ceased operating in 2024.

== Channel listing ==
Channels	Owner / Genre	Other details
Turner Classic Movies	Turner Broadcasting System Latin America	English language
Warner Channel	HBO Latin American Group	English language
Sky News	Sky	English language
AXN	HBO Latin America Group	English language
History Channel	HBO Latin American Group	English language
Sony Entertainment Television	HBO Latin American Group	English language
Investigation Discovery	Discovery Networks Latin America	English language
HBO	HBO Latin American Group	English language
Nickelodeon	MTV Networks Latin America	English language
Discovery Channel	Discovery Networks	English language
VH1	MTV Networks Latin America	English language
Saint FM	Radio from Saint Helena	English language
Myriam's Country	Music	English language
National Geographic Channel	ESPN-Disney/ABC	English language
KTV Live Events	KTV	English language
ESPN2 Caribbean	ESPN-Disney/ABC	English language
ESPN Caribbean	ESPN-Disney/ABC	English language
NBA TV International	Turner Broadcasting System Latin America	English language
Fox Sports	ESPN-Disney/ABC	Spanish language
Fox Sports 2	ESPN-Disney/ABC	Spanish language
Fox Sports 3	ESPN-Disney/ABC	Spanish language
CNN International	Turner Broadcasting System Latin America	English language
BBC World News	BBC Worldwide	English language
BBC Entertainment	BBC Worldwide	English language
FOX News Channel	Fox Corporation	English language
BBC World Service on FM/MW	BBC Worldwide	English language
Falkland Islands Television (FITV)	Local programmes	English language
Canal 24 Horas	Televisión Nacional de Chile (Chilean Cable network)	Spanish language
TV Chile	Televisión Nacional de Chile (Chilean Cable network)	Spanish language
TruTV	Turner Broadcasting System Latin America	English language
TBS Comedy/Movies	Turner Broadcasting System Latin America	English language
TNT	Turner Broadcasting System Latin America	English language
TNT Series	Turner Broadcasting System Latin America	English language
Discovery Home & Health	Discovery Networks	English language
TLC	Discovery Networks	English language
Animal Planet	Discovery Networks	English language
CBeebies BBC	BBC Worldwide	English language
BBC	BBC Worldwide	English language
BBC Two (on SD)	BBC Worldwide	English language
Discovery Kids	Discovery Networks Latin America	English language
Living Free TV	FTA	English language
Falkland News 24	FTA	English language
FIFA WC	1998, 2002, 2006, 2010 and 2014	Live Coverage
Al Jazeera		
Boomerang		

== Other operations ==
KTV Ltd. operates Radio Nova, a rebroadcast service for BBC World Service, BBC World News, and Saint FM in association with the stations on FM, MW and DVB-T (Digital Terrestrial).

== Competitors ==
The only other broadcasters licensed to operate in the Falkland Islands are the local radio station FIRS and the British Forces Broadcasting Service (BFBS).

== See also ==
- Falkland Islands Radio Service
