= Saint FM Community Radio =

Coordinates: 15°56′40″S 5°43′0″W

Saint FM
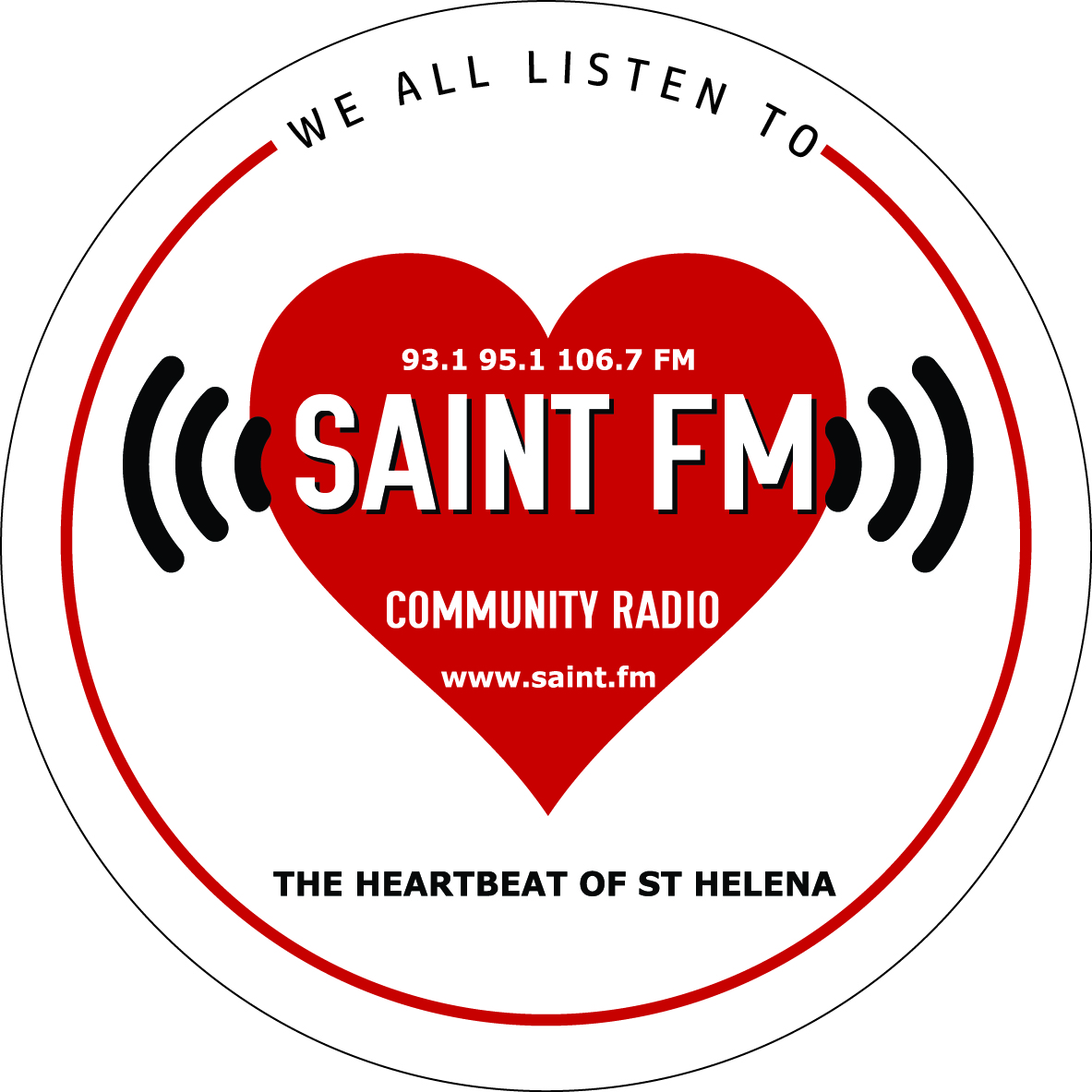

Saint Helena Island
- Broadcast area: Saint Helena
- Frequencies: 93.1 MHz (west); 95.1 MHz (east); 106.7 MHz (Jamestown)

History
- First air date: 10 March 2013; 12 years ago

Saint FM Community Radio is a radio station serving the South Atlantic island of Saint Helena.

The station is owned by Saint FM Community Radio (Guarantee) Limited, a charity company legally registered in St. Helena and limited by guarantee. The station's studios and administration offices are located at Association Hall, Main Street, Jamestown. Its membership comprises those of the island's population who wish to join.

The only competing radio services on the island as of 2021 are operated by South Atlantic Media Services: S.A.M.S. Radio 1 (news, features and entertainment) and S.A.M.S. Radio 2 (relay of the BBC World Service).

== History ==
Following the closure of the original Saint FM on 21 December 2012 it was widely felt that the island had need of a non-government-operated independent radio station.

On 15 January 2013 a group of radio enthusiasts met at Association Hall and a management committee was formed with the goal to get Saint FM back on air. The idea of a community-owned and operated station emerged and in The Independent newspaper on 18 January 2013 it was announced: "It’s Official – SaintFM is Coming Back".

A broadcasting licence application was made in mid-January 2013 with a license being granted on Friday 22 February.

The station commenced test transmissions in Jamestown on 106.7 MHz on 23 February 2013 and also on 93.1 MHz (west), and 95.1 MHz (east) on 9 March. The official launch was at 8a.m. on Sunday 10 March 2013.

== Opening ==
The station officially opened at a few minutes after 8a.m. on Sunday 10 March 2013. After an opening greeting by Les Baldwin the first track played was The Show Must Go On by Queen, the chairperson of Saint FM Community Radio, Julie Thomas, delivered a welcoming speech.

== Membership ==
Saint FM Community Radio offers membership to all who wish to join. As of 26 April 2013 membership stood at 716, making it the largest community group on St. Helena.

== Fundraising ==
Saint FM Community Radio relies on advertising income, membership fees, fundraising and donations to keep it operational. One such fundraising activity was Tony Leo's "Radio Marathon"; broadcasting non-stop for 27 hours (apart from five-minute toilet breaks) Tony raised much-needed funds for the station. Tony's record was beaten on 22–23 May 2015 by Les Baldwin who managed 32 hours. Other events have included tea parties, dances, raffles, concerts and a 'Market Day'.

== Frequencies and coverage ==
- 106.7 MHz from Association Hall, Jamestown, serving Jamestown, The Briars and some parts of Alarm Forest
- 93.1 MHz from a residence just below High Knoll Fort, serving Half Tree Hollow, St. Paul's and the eastern parts of Blue Hill
- 95.1 MHz from 'Foxy's Garage', serving Longwood and the East of the island
- 91.1 MHz serving Blue Hill and Sandy Bay.

Saint FM Community Radio is also available worldwide via Internet Radio. On TuneIn and on Android devices on the Saint FM App . Saint FM can also be heard via Radio Garden .

Saint FM Community Radio is also rebroadcast in the Falkland Islands (as part of a cable channel) and Ascension Island (on 91.4 MHz and 95.5 MHz). Both these places have a substantial population of 'Saints' (as St. Helenians are commonly known).

Expansion: Release of Saint FM to the Apple Store for iOS devices aimed for later in 2020.
