= Jacob's Ladder (Saint Helena) =

Stairway in Jamestown, Saint Helena

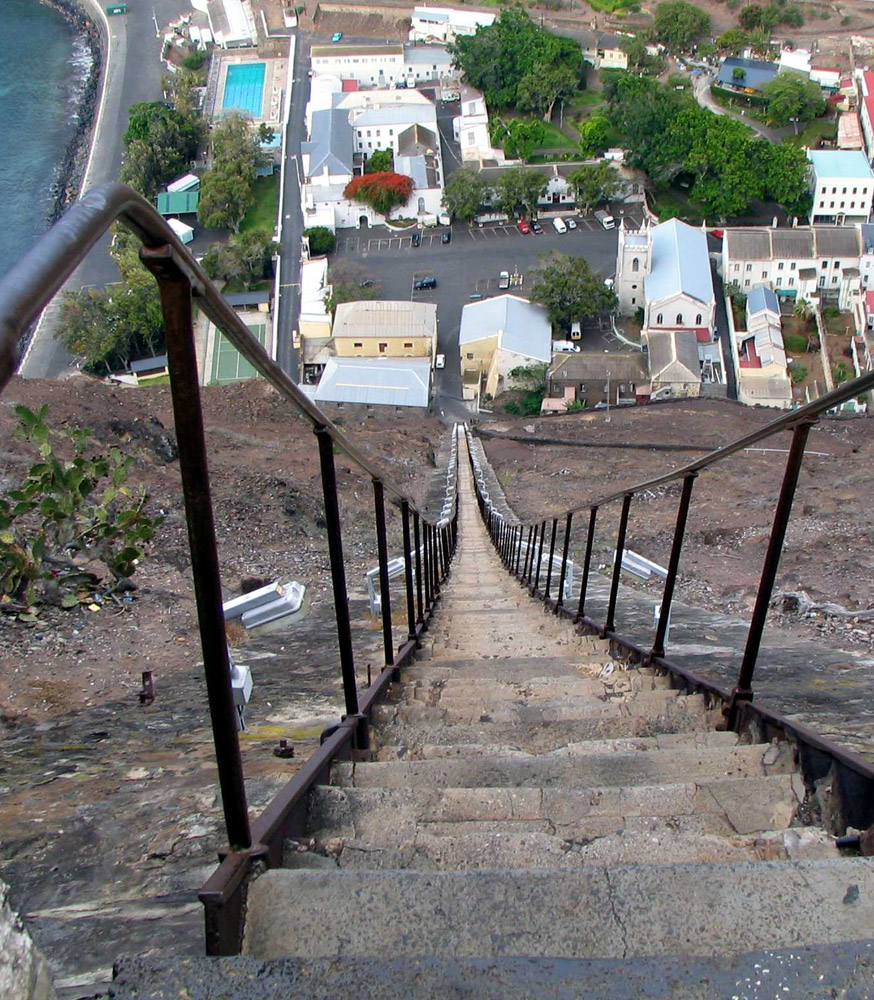
- The view down Jacob's Ladder, looking onto Jamestown

Overview
- Owner: Saint Helena Railway Company
- Locale: Jamestown, Saint Helena, Ascension and Tristan da Cunha
- Coordinates: 15.9256°S 5.7192°W
- Termini: Jamestown (lower station); Half Tree Hollow (upper station)
- Stations: 2

Service
- Type: Funicular
- Rolling stock: 2 cars

History
- Opened: 1829; 197 years ago
- Closed: 1871; 155 years ago

Technical
- Line length: 281.6 metres (924 ft)
- Highest elevation: 183 metres (600 ft)
- Maximum incline: 87% (41°)

Jacob's Ladder is a Grade I listed staircase leading from Jamestown, Saint Helena, up the side of Ladder Hill to Ladder Hill Fort. The name is a reference to the biblical Jacob's Ladder, a ladder extending to heaven.

The ladder is all that remains of a cable railway that was built there in the early 1800s. Its tracks and cars were later removed, although the stairs have remained in place and have become a tourist attraction connecting Jamestown and the suburb of Half Tree Hollow at the top of the hill.

== History and description ==
Designed by the local engineer J. W. Hoar, the Saint Helena Railway Company built a two-car inclined plane, 924 feet (281.6 m)-long, in 1829 to carry cargo between Jamestown and the fort. The cars rode on a pair of iron-plated fir rails, laid on wooden sleepers anchored into the rock of the valley wall, that were separated by a staircase of 700 steps for pedestrians. The angle of ascent varied between 39 and 41 degrees. Motive power was provided by a team of three donkeys at the top that rotated a capstan connected to the cars by an iron chain and pulleys.

Termite damage to the sleepers caused the Royal Engineers to remove the cars, rails and associated machinery in 1871, and it is now known as Jacob's Ladder. Subsequent roadwork covered one step so that only 699 remain. Lights were installed along the sides of the stairs in 2000 and the steps were refurbished in 2006. The staircase has been declared a Grade I listed structure. During the island's annual "Festival of Running", a timed run takes place up Jacob's Ladder, with people coming from around the world to take part. As of 2024, the record time to ascend the stairs is 4 minutes, 40.75 seconds.

== Gallery ==
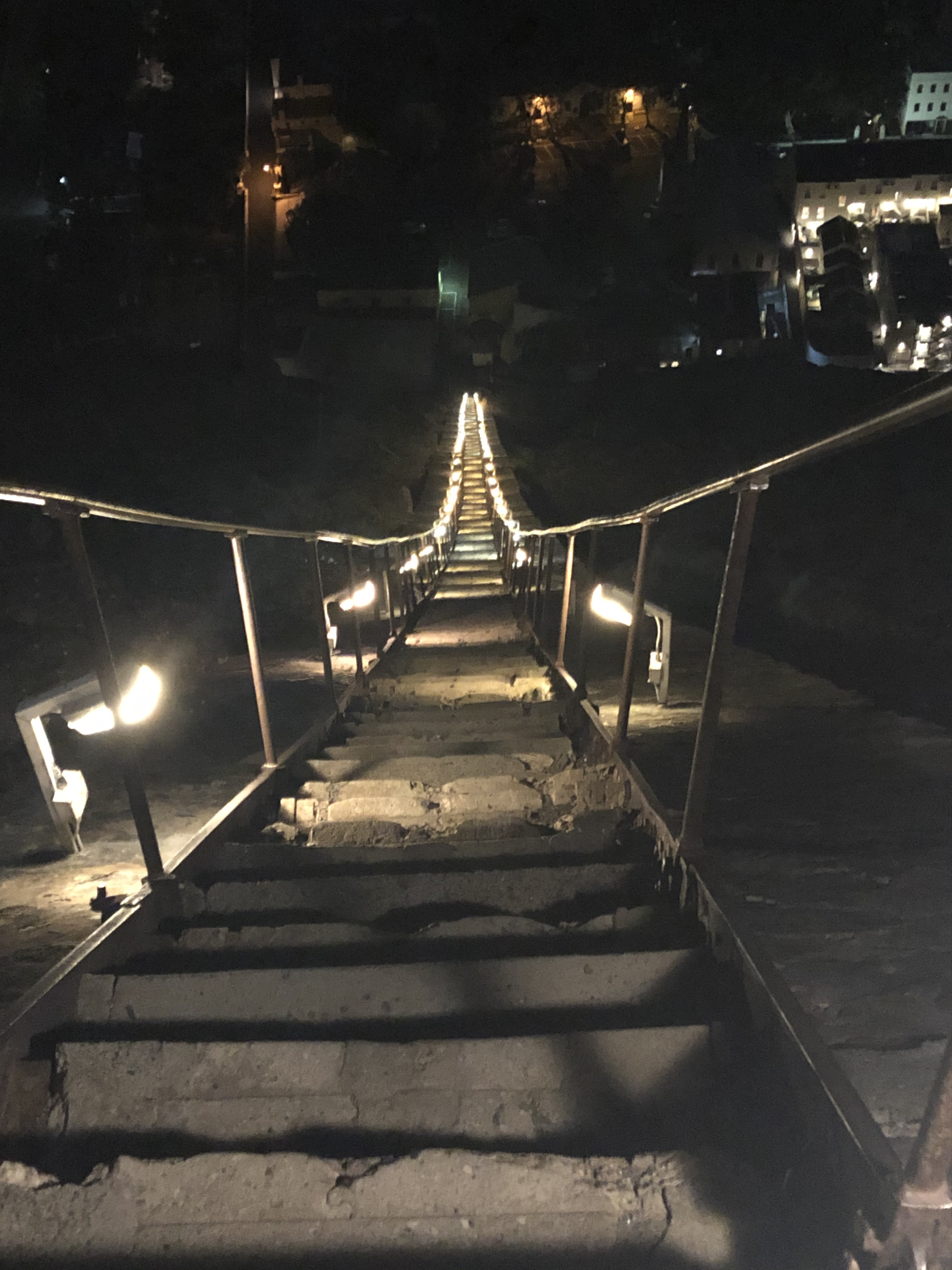
Looking down at night

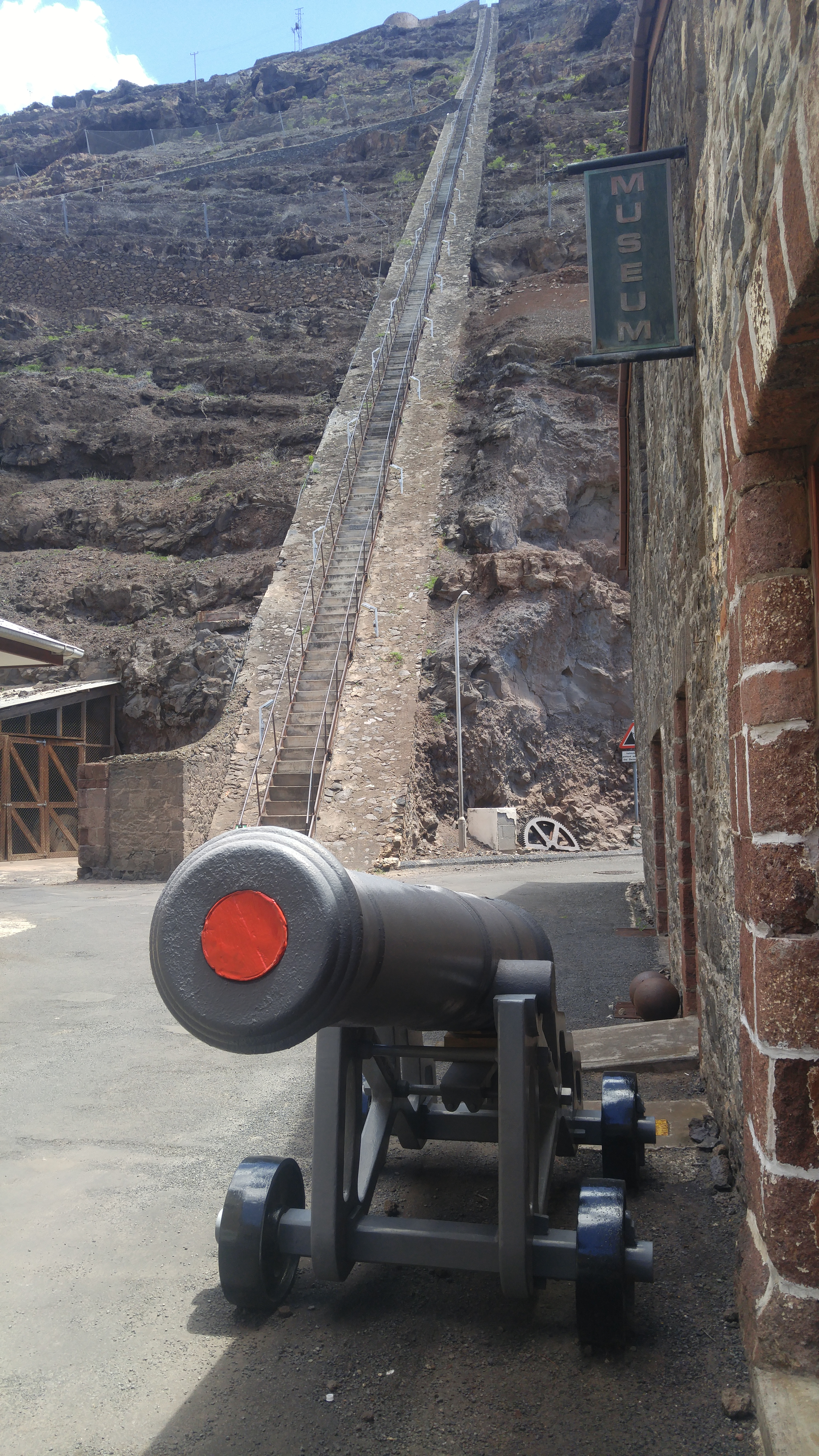
Foot of the ladder in Jamestown

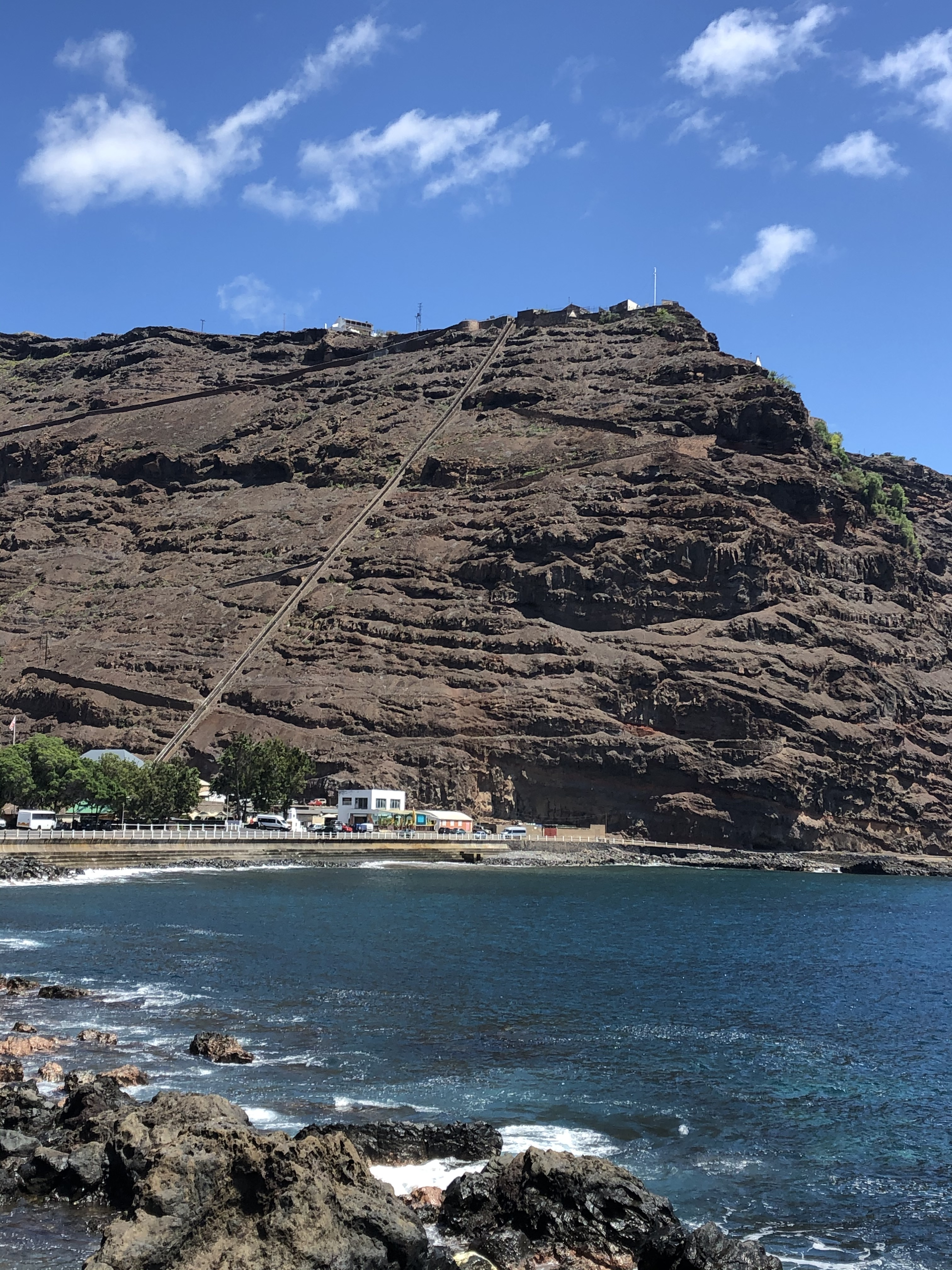
From the harbour

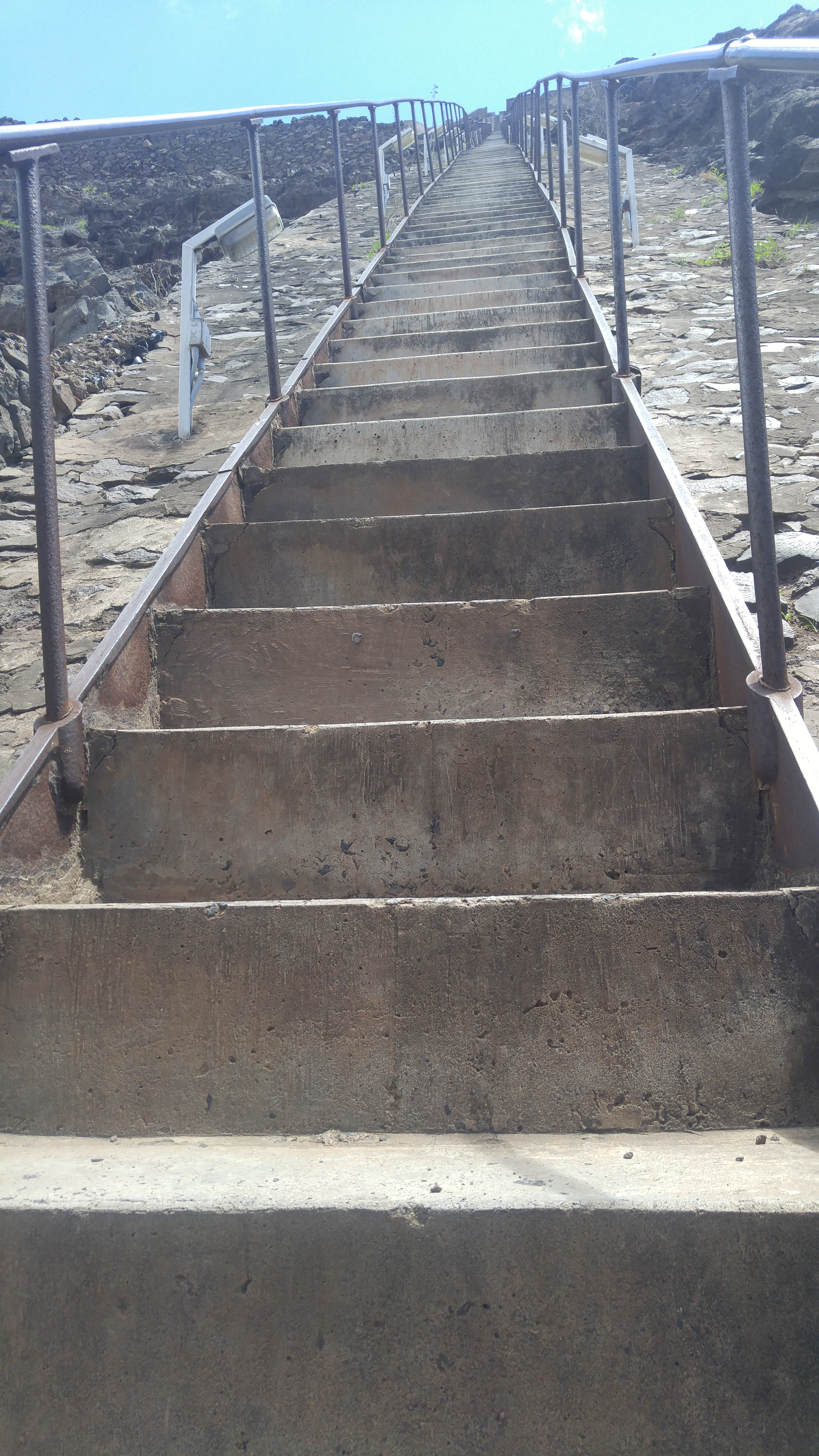
View while climbing

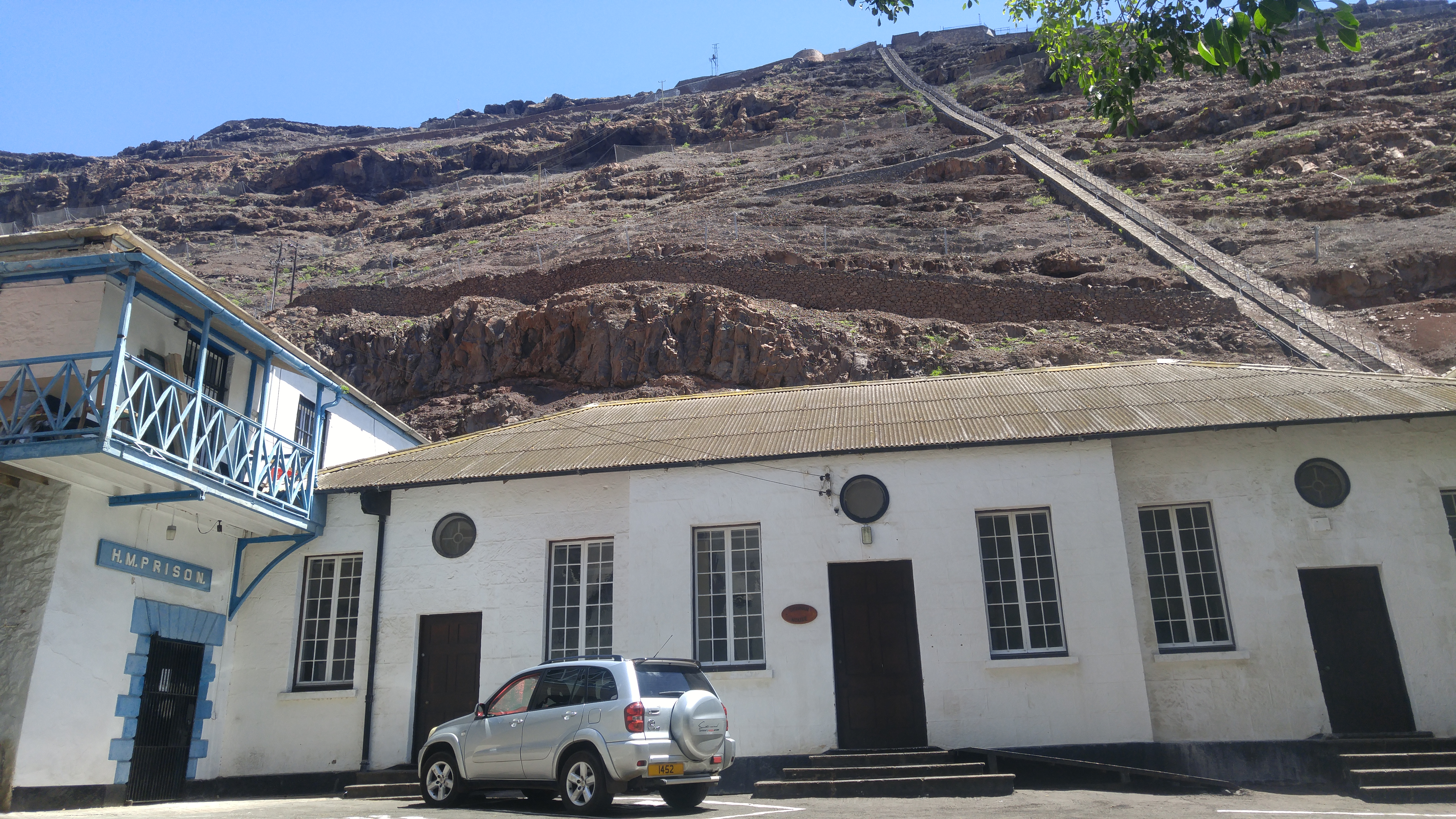
From behind the prison

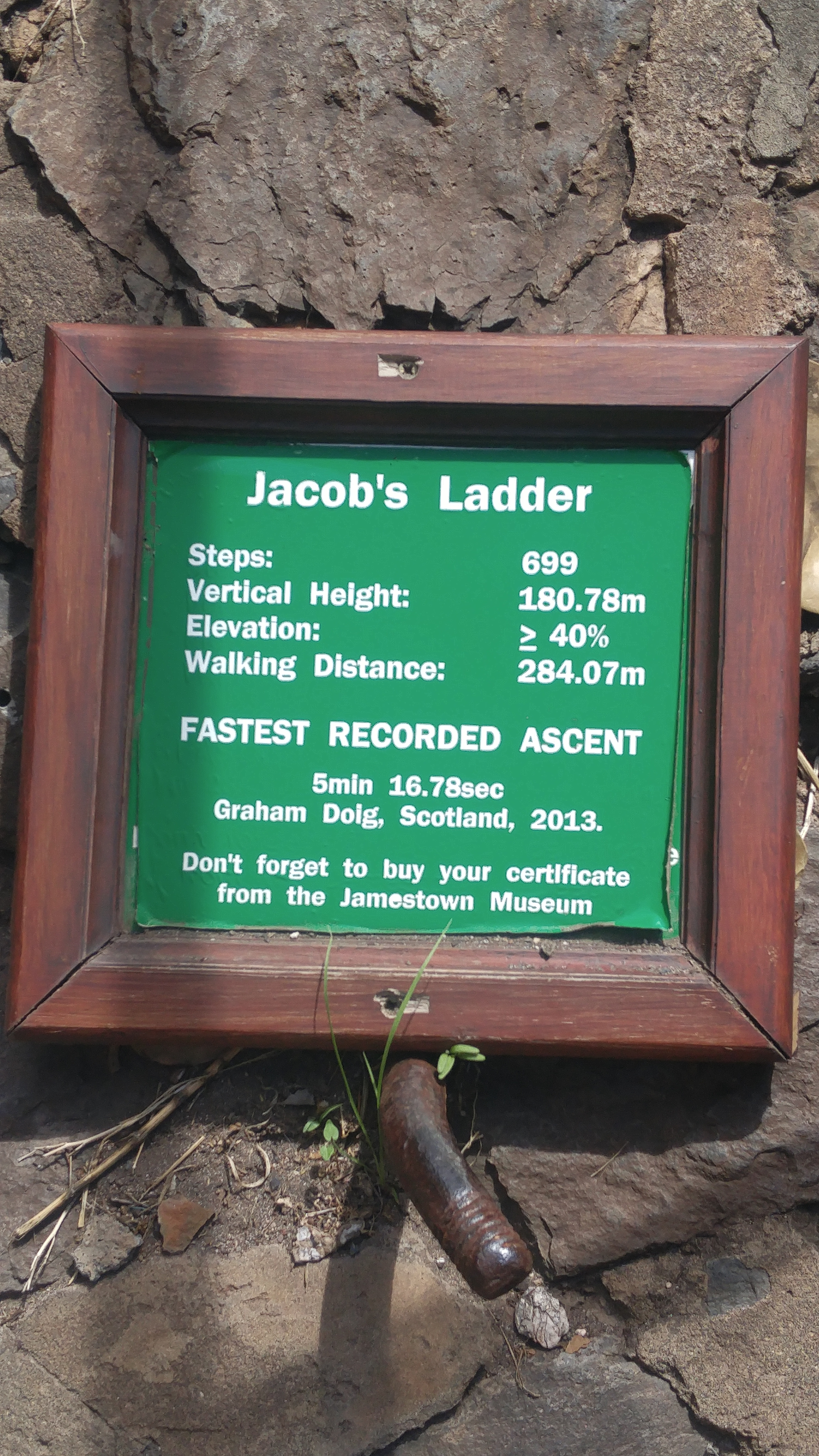
Plaque in Jamestown

== See also ==
- List of funicular railways
- Transport on Saint Helena
- Manitou Incline
