= Falkland Islands Television =

- Country: United Kingdom
- Broadcast area: Falkland Islands
- Headquarters: Stanley, Falkland Islands

Programming
- Language: English
- Picture format: 1080i/1080p HDTV

Ownership
- Owner: KTV Ltd. and Stanley Services

History
- Launched: 1 April 2011; 15 years ago

Links
- Website: fitv.co.fk

Falkland Islands Television (FITV) is the first local television station in the Falkland Islands. Founded in 2010 and with regular broadcasts starting in 2011, it is owned in equal parts by KTV Ltd., of Chilean businessman Mario Zuvic Bulic, residents of the island, and Stanley Services Limited.

== History ==
KTV and Stanley Services announced in September 2010 that they would launch a local television channel, mostly for the provision of news content. In an initial phase, FITV would carry two to three news updates per week, while the company was staffed by locals who underwent training for its launch. Up until then, the only television options were KTV (the channel would, by extension, be made available to all KTV subscribers) and the terrestrial relays of the BFBS channels (BFBS 1 across the islands and BFBS 2 only in Stanley).

The station's launch was delayed several times, only settling on a definitive date in March 2011, with the station tentatively launching in April. It was touted as "the world's smallest TV station", being staffed by only two people. Its cameras were already recording footage of local events ahead of launch, including the Goose Green Motocross event on 6 March. The station received training from Bournemouth University during this period.

FITV finally went live on 1 April 2011 at 7pm, with the first edition of its regular news bulletins. Since KTV's signal only reached the North Camp and Stanley areas, the partners had to resort to DVD distribution for its programmes to be seen across the territory, as well as plans to launch it on the internet to reach a wider audience.

By 2017, station has been using mobile journalism for its three journalists to produce content for the weekly newsmagazine in a more efficient way, as well as to boost its online audiences outside of the territory. Footage is compiled using Premiere Pro, however, additional footage that does not make it to the programme, is usually reserved for its social media profiles. Since 2020, it is available on the BFBS MiPlayer for Falkland Islands civilians, using the local broadband network.

== Programming ==
FITV produces Falklands In Focus, a weekly news programme. It is shown nightly in the 7pm slot and is cycled until a new edition is released the following Friday. Other programmes for special interests, such as current affairs programmes and programmes of particular interest, including sports and social events. An in-depth monthly show, Talking Point, is also produced, as well as documentaries on facets of Falkland life. The channel loops its programming throughout the week. By being on the KTV service, it is available for a small fee.

The 2017 Island Games, held on the Swedish island of Gotland, were carried on FITV, and were sponsored by the Falkland Islands Company. It also produced a special documentary for the fortieth anniversary of the Falklands War in 2022.
