= Falkland Islands Radio Service =

Radio station in Falkland Islands

Falkland Islands Radio Service (FIRS)
- Stanley; Falkland Islands
- Frequencies: Medium Wave: 530 kHz; 88.3 MHz (Stanley); 90, 96.5 & 88 MHz (East Falkland); 102 & 105 MHz (West Falkland)

Programming
- Language: English
- Format: FM, medium wave, internet

History
- First air date: 1929

Links
- Website: radio.co.fk

Falkland Islands Radio Service is an independent radio broadcaster in the Falkland Islands. Although officially called Falkland Islands Radio Service, the station ident is Falklands Radio, and it is often referred to as FIRS. The station broadcasts for 76 hours each week and provides a wide range of programming including all music genres, local news and phone-in shows. The station has five full-time staff members, approximately 15 part-time presenters and volunteers from the community contribute to some programming. The station's main competitors are KTV Radio Nova and KTV Radio Nova Saint FM, as well as BFBS the Forces Station.

== History ==
Radio was introduced to the Falkland Islands in 1929 under the auspices of Rediffusion, under the direction of Sir Arnold Hodson, the governor of the time. The station, known to locals as "the box", was headquartered at Ross Road, which then set up links from overhead wires to households. This was replaced by a wireless system in 1942. It moved to its current headquarters on John Street in 1955.

== Hacking ==
On 3 April 2015, its website was hacked by a digital activist simply known as "Líbero", as part of a string of hacks made to Falkland websites on the 33rd anniversary of the Argentine invasion. The website was replaced by a video of Argentine soldiers set to the track of the Argentine national anthem and the message saying that the islands were Argentine.
