= Saint FM =

Radio station serving Saint Helena

Coordinates: 15°56′40″S 5°43′0″W

Saint FM 94.7 was a radio station serving the South Atlantic island of Saint Helena. The station's studios and administration offices were located at Association Hall, Main Street, Jamestown. It was the only independent radio station broadcasting on Saint Helena, and was also the island's only FM station.

The station also broadcast via the Internet and was relayed by stations in Ascension Island and the Falkland Islands. The organisation also produces a weekly newspaper, the St Helena Independent, which continues despite the closure of SaintFM.

The managing director of the station was Mikael Olsson.

The radio frequencies vacated by Saint FM have been taken over by Saint FM Community Radio. Saint FM 94.7 closed down on 31 April 2018 at midnight.

== History ==
Saint FM was started by Johnny Drummond, whose bequest provided the initial funding for the station. Talks about the new station began in August 2003 between Drummond and the current station manager of Saint FM, Mike Olsson. Negotiations started soon afterwards and the broadcasting licence was issued on 22 July 2004.

The station commenced test transmissions on the Internet on 28 September 2004, and on FM via a temporary aerial on 27 September 2004.

After three months of test transmissions Saint FM officially opened with scheduled broadcasts on 3 January 2005.

In June 2006 broadcasts commenced in Ascension Island on 91.4 MHz, locally re-broadcast by VT Merlin Communications.

On 1 September 2006 Saint FM began broadcasting to Stanley on the Falkland Islands on 95.5 MHz. The re-broadcast service was provided by KTV Ltd on the Falkland Islands under the title 'KTV Radio Nova Saint FM', and was extended to cover residents in the vicinity of RAF Mount Pleasant.

The station closed on 21 December 2012.

== Closure ==
Saint FM posted the following on Wednesday 19 December 2012 on its Facebook page:

Saint FM to Close Down on Friday

The decision was taken earlier today [Wednesday] to close Saint FM permanently at 4:00pm this coming Friday, 21 December.

Keeping a private sector radio station on the air has always been difficult in St Helena and over the last two years or so it has become almost impossible as a result of the St Helena Government's attitude towards private sector media and its policy of supporting and favouring government financed media.

Despite Saint FM's undoubted popularity, world-wide broadcasting capability and successful involvement in community fund-raising projects the radio station's editorial policy to encourage open debate and expression of opinion has always been a point of controversy with the Island's government and other establishment interests.

The government's attack on private sector media has already threatened the existence of Saint FM's media partner, The St Helena Independent. It was found possible to resurrect the Island's only private sector newspaper through further cost-cutting measures. Throughout this period the government poured hundreds of thousands of pounds into the government subsidised St Helena Broadcasting [Guarantee] Corporation making it extremely difficult for an unsubsidised private sector media business to compete.

Unlike the weekly Independent newspaper Saint FM broadcasts 24 hours a day, seven days a week and relies on a minimum number of paid staff and a lot of goodwill from volunteers, the public, the government and other business interests to keep going. It has become increasingly difficult to continue broadcasting as relations and co-operation with government have worsened in recent months and weeks.

Mike Olsson said it is the total effect of the continual and increasing number of obstacles and awkwardness put in the path of the daily job and increasing the workload which makes you wonder if all the hours needed to keep a private sector radio station on the air can be sustained.

Mike added that recent difficulties with Cable & Wireless, who repeatedly closed down transmission of Saint FM while working on equipment at High Knoll Fort, caused a great deal of unnecessary extra work in order to sort the problem out. He also stated that, while the governor's Christmas message was in no way a reason for closing down Saint FM, the very fact that Mark Capes should use a Christmas message as an advert for government financed media shows very clearly the attitude of certain key officials within government towards private sector media and the private sector in general. 'Small private sector businesses cannot compete against governments who have almost unlimited resources by comparison, Mike said. 'It is clearly evident to all, they are prepared to use large amounts of public money on unnecessary schemes in order to pander to their prejudices while vital public services become worse with each passing week'.

SaintFM closed down at 4p.m. on 21 December 2012. After a brief speech from the station's owner, Mikael Olsson, the final record played was The Carnival Is Over by The Seekers. Then the transmitter was switched off.

== Programmes ==
The majority of programming was music-based, with a significant number of requests being played for islanders from relatives and friends overseas and vice versa.

As befits the musical preference of many Saint Helenians, much country music was played, but the most popular music styles from the last 50 years were also featured.

Weekday daytime programmes were usually presented by station staff, with evening and weekend programming done by 'voluntary presenters'. 'Local news' (which also included events on Ascension Island and the Falkland Islands) was broadcast throughout the day. The station also did international news bulletins as well as international and local sports updates throughout the day.

The programming style could best be described as 'informal'.

Many of the station's requests were placed by 'Saints' contacting relatives worldwide.

As a commercial station, Saint FM played adverts for local businesses. Some of these are still available online.

== Saint Helena frequencies ==
Although Saint Helena is a small island, its terrain is such that island-wide coverage requires more than one transmitter.

The main island transmitter was at High Knoll Fort, and radiated on 93.1 MHz. From this were also fed:

- a relay at The Flag, for the Levelwood area, opened July 2007, which operated on 95.1 MHz.
- a relay for the Blue Hill and Barren Ground area, on 91.1 MHz from the Head 'O Wain TV transmitter site.

The High Knoll Fort transmitter was itself fed from a transmitter located at the studios in Jamestown, which radiated on 106.7 MHz. This transmitter also provided a service in Jamestown.

== FM DX ==
Because of its remoteness, Saint FM was interested to hear from people who could receive the station at unusually long distances, for example in Africa or at sea, direct from its main 93.1 MHz FM transmitter on Saint Helena.
