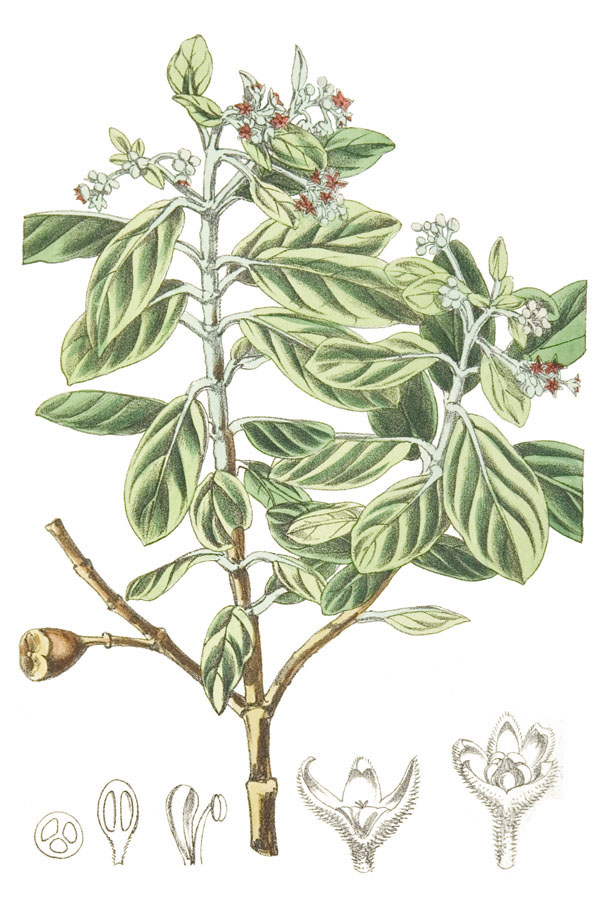

Conservation status
- Extinct (2003) (IUCN 3.1)

Scientific classification
- Kingdom: Plantae
- Clade: Embryophytes
- Clade: Tracheophytes
- Clade: Spermatophytes
- Clade: Angiosperms
- Clade: Eudicots
- Clade: Rosids
- Order: Rosales
- Family: Rhamnaceae
- Tribe: Phyliceae
- Genus: †Nesiota; Hook.f.
- Species: †N. elliptica

Binomial name
- †Nesiota elliptica (Roxb.) Hook.f.

= Saint Helena olive =

Extinct species of flowering plant

The Saint Helena olive (Nesiota elliptica) is an extinct species of flowering plant. It is the only member of the genus Nesiota. It was endemic to the island of Saint Helena in the South Atlantic Ocean. Despite its name, it is unrelated to the true olive (Olea europaea), but is instead a member of the family Rhamnaceae, the family which contains buckthorns and jujube. The last remaining tree in the wild died in 1994, and the last remaining individual in cultivation died in December 2003, despite conservation efforts. It is thus a prime example of recent plant extinction. The Saint Helena olive belongs to the tribe Phyliceae, which are mostly endemic to Southern Africa.

== Description ==
The Saint Helena olive was native to the cloud forest found in the upland areas of the island above 750 metres (2,460 ft), with many historical records around Diana's Peak (the highest point on the island). It grew as a small, low growing spreading tree with prolific branching. The bark was dark brown to black. The leaves were oblong in shape and dark green, with downward curving tips. The undersides of the leaves were pale with hairs that lay flat along the leaf. During the flowering season, which is presumed to have run from June to October, the tree bore tightly packed pink flowers on branched inflorescences. The flowers are presumed to have been pollinated by the local endemic hoverfly species Sphaerophoria beattiei. The fruit took a year to mature, and consisted of a hard woody capsule containing shiny triangular black seeds.

== Extinction ==
The Saint Helena olive was already rare by the 19th century due to deforestation and grazing by introduced goats, and was previously thought to be extinct until a single living specimen was discovered in 1977. It was highly self-incompatible, meaning that most seeds produced with itself or close relatives would fail, making it extremely difficult to grow seedlings, given that the population size for the plant had probably always been low. Despite immense effort, only a single cutting of the plant was able to be cultivated, with a handful of seedlings grown from it. The original wild plant died in 1994, making the species extinct in the wild. The final known specimen in cultivation, a seedling of the cutting, which had been the only surviving plant since 1999, died in 2003 from fungus and termite infestation, making the species totally extinct. A sample of DNA from the Saint Helena Olive is stored at Kew Gardens DNA bank. The Saint Helena Olive is one of a number of plant species to have gone extinct on Saint Helena since the arrival of the Portuguese in 1502, including Trochetiopsis melanoxylon, Acalypha rubrinervis, Wahlenbergia roxburghii, and Heliotropium pannifolium, with Lachanodes arborea and Trochetiopsis erythroxylon also extinct in the wild.

== Phylogenetics ==
The Saint Helena olive is part of the tribe Phyliceae within Rhamnaceae. The Phyliceae are mostly endemic to Southern Africa, particularly the Fynbos region of South Africa.

Relationships of Phyliceae, after

- - Phyliceae
    - - Noltea
    - - - Phylica
      - - Trichocephalus
        - †Nesiota

== See also ==
- Flora of St Helena
