= Flora of Saint Helena =

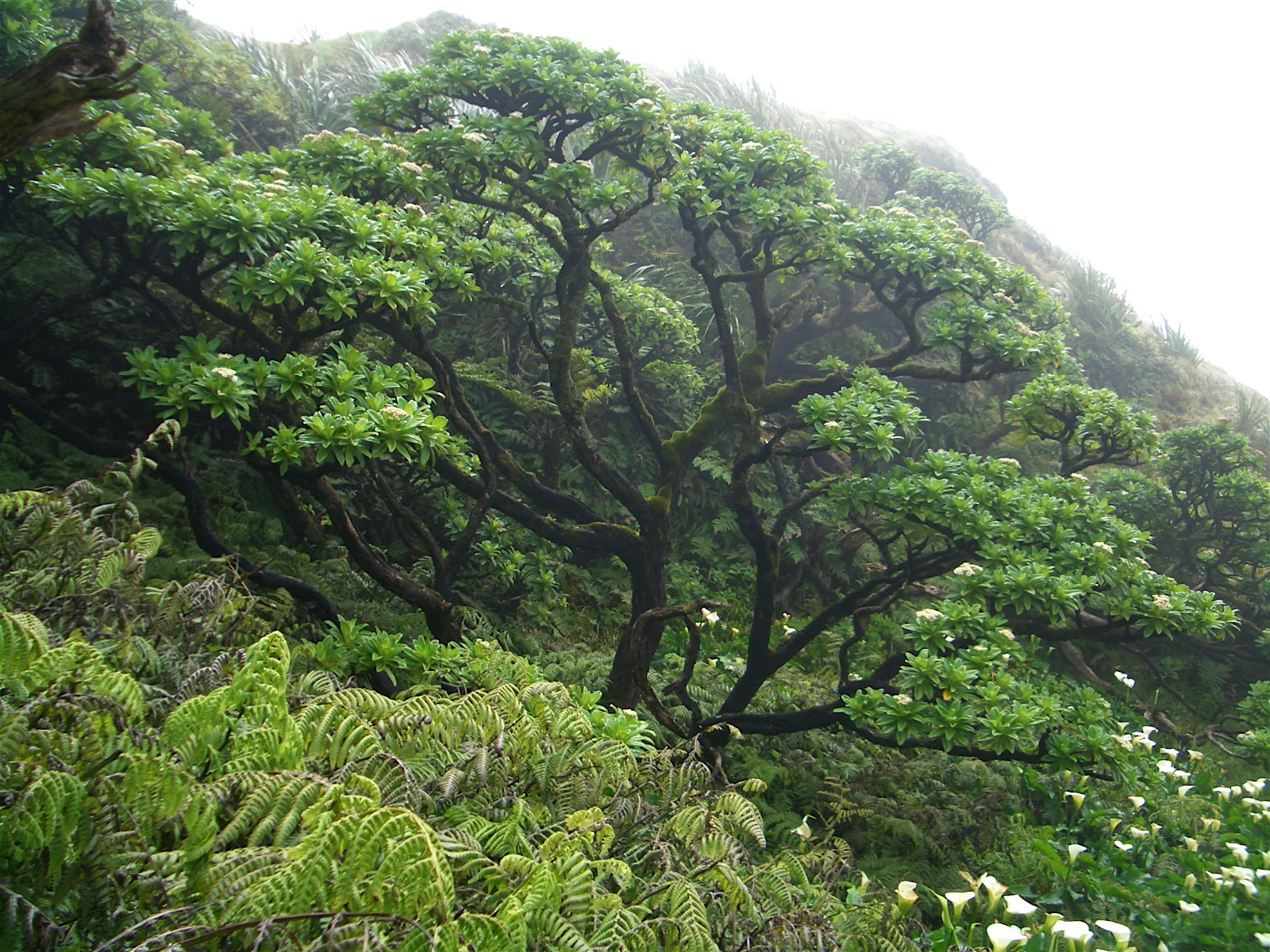
Remnant of a native Cabbage Tree forest in Saint Helena.

The flora of Saint Helena, an isolated island in the South Atlantic Ocean, is exceptional in its high level of endemism and the severe threats facing the survival of the flora. In phytogeography, it is in the phytochorion St. Helena and Ascension Region of the African Subkingdom, in the Paleotropical Kingdom.

== Endemic and introduced flora ==
The endemic plants of Saint Helena include many notable Cabbage Tree or, "insular arborescent Asteraceae", members of the daisy family which have evolved a shrubby or tree-like habit on islands. Other notable endemics include the closely related St Helena redwood (Trochetiopsis erythroxylon) and St Helena dwarf ebony (Trochetiopsis ebenus). These are unrelated to the redwood trees of California or to the ebony trees of commerce, being instead in the Mallow family (Malvaceae).

== Vegetation ==
Today there are three major vegetation zones: the tree-fern thicket of the highest parts of the central ridge; the pastures of middle elevations and the dry, eroded "crown wastes" of lower elevations. Of these only the tree-fern thicket is a natural vegetation type. The middle elevations were formerly covered with native woodland of gumwoods (Commidendrum) and other trees, now largely destroyed. The "Crown wastes" or coastal zones were formerly covered with native scrub, of which a major component was probably St Helena dwarf ebony (Trochetiopsis ebenus) and St Helena tree ebony Trochetiopsis melanoxylon).

== Human impact and conservation ==
The destruction of the native vegetation began soon after the discovery of the island by the Portuguese in 1502, with the introduction of goats. As there were no native herbivorous mammals, the flora was unadapted to such threats. Later with the establishment of permanent settlement on the island by the English East India Company in 1659, many introduced plants became established which created new vegetation types. Furthermore the native trees were subject to catastrophic cutting for such purposes as housebuilding and to fuel stills for the distillation of arrack. As a result of this legacy many endemic plant species are extinct or critically endangered.

== Endemic vascular plants of St Helena ==
† = Extinct

Monocotyledons

- Bulbostylis lichtensteiniana (Kunth) C.B.Clarke
- Bulbostylis neglecta (Hemsl.) C.B.Clarke
- Carex dianae Steud.
- Carex praealta Boott
- Eragrostis episcopulus Lambdon, Darlow, Clubbe & Cope
- Eragrostis saxatilis Hemsl.
- Panicum joshuae Lambdon

Dicotyledons

- †Acalypha rubrinervis Cronk
- Berula bracteata (Roxb.) Spalik & S.R.Downie
- Berula burchellii (Hook.f.) Spalik & S.R.Downie
- Chenopodium helenense Aellen
- Commidendrum robustum (Roxb.) DC.
- Commidendrum rotundifolium (Roxb.) DC.
- Commidendrum rugosum (Aiton) DC.
- Commidendrum spurium (G.Forst.) DC.
- Euphorbia heleniana Thell. & Stapf
- Frankenia portulacifolia (Roxb.) Spreng.
- †Heliotropium pannifolium Burch. ex Hemsl.
- Hydrodea cryptantha (Hook.f.) N.E.Br.
- Hypertelis acida (Hook.f.) K. Müll.
- Kewa acida (Hook.) Christenh.
- Lachanodes arborea (Roxb.) B. Nord.
- Melanodendron integrifolium (Roxb.) DC.
- Melhania × benjaminii (Cronk) Dorr
- Melhania ebenus (Cronk) Dorr
- Melhania erythroxylon (G.Forst.) R.Br.
- †Melhania melanoxylon (Sol. ex Sims) R.Br.
- Mellissia begoniifolia (Roxb.) Hook.f.
- †Nesiota elliptica (Roxb.) Hook.f.
- Nesohedyotis arborea (Roxb.) Bremek.
- Osteospermum sanctae-helenae Norl.
- Pelargonium cotyledonis (L.) L'Hér.
- Petrobium arboreum (J.R.Forst. & G.Forst.) R.Br.
- Phylica polifolia (Vahl) Pillans
- Pladaroxylon leucadendron (G.Forst.) Hook.f.
- Plantago robusta Roxb.
- Trimeris scaevolifolia (Roxb.) Mabb.
- Wahlenbergia angustifolia (Roxb.) A.DC.
- †Wahlenbergia burchellii A.DC. in DC.
- Wahlenbergia linifolia (Roxb.) A.DC.
- †Wahlenbergia roxburghii A.DC.

Pteridophytes (Ferns and fern-allies)

- Asplenium compressum Sw.
- Asplenium haughtonii (Hook.) Bir, Fraser-Jenk. & Lovis
- Asplenium platybasis Kunze ex Mett.
- Ceterach haughtoni (Hook.) Cronk
- Christella prolixa (Willd.) Holttum
- Dicksonia arborescens L'Hér.
- Diplazium filamentosum (Roxb.) Cronk
- Dryopteris cognata (C.Presl) Kuntze
- Dryopteris napoleonis (Bory) Kuntze
- Elaphoglossum dimorphum (Hook. & Grev.) T.Moore
- Elaphoglossum furcatum (L.f.) Christ
- Elaphoglossum nervosum (Bory) H.Christ
- Grammitis ebenina (Maxon) Tardieu
- Hymenophyllum capillaceum Roxb.
- Lycopodium axillare Roxb.
- Microstaphyla furcata (L.f.) Fée
- Ophioglossum polyphyllum A.Braun
- Pseudophegopteris dianae (Hook.) Holttum
- Pteris paleacea Roxb.

== Endemic genera ==
- Commidendrum
- Lachanodes
- Melanodendron
- Mellissia
- †Nesiota
- Nesohedyotis
- Petrobium
- Pladaroxylon
- Trochetiopsis

== See also ==
- Wildlife of Saint Helena, Ascension and Tristan da Cunha

== Sources ==
- Melliss, John Charles (1875). St Helena. Reeve, London.
