= Cabbage tree =

Cabbage tree is a common name for several plant species:

- Andira inermis, native to Central and South America
- Various members of the genus Cordyline native to New Zealand.
  - Cordyline australis (Cabbage tree)
  - Cordyline banksii (Forest cabbage tree)
  - Cordyline indivisa (Mountain cabbage tree, Broad-leaved cabbage tree)
  - Cordyline obtecta (Three Kings cabbage tree, native also to Norfolk Island, where it is known as Norfolk Island cabbage tree)
  - Cordyline pumilio (Dwarf cabbage tree, Pygmy cabbage tree)
- Cussonia spicata, native to southern parts of Africa
- Gyrocarpus americanus
- Livistona australis, the Cabbage tree palm of coastal New South Wales
- Moringa stenopetala, a crop tree native to Ethiopia and Kenya
- Sonchus brassicifolius, syn. Dendroseris litoralis, native to Chile's Juan Fernandez archipelago
- Various members of the Asteraceae from Saint Helena
  - Pladaroxylon leucadendron (He cabbage tree - so called because its leaves are hairy)
  - Lachanodes arborea (She cabbage tree - so called because its leaves are not hairy)
  - Melanodendron integrifolium (Black cabbage tree)

== See also ==
- Cabbage-tree hat
- Cabbage Tree Island (disambiguation)
- Cabbage Palm (disambiguation)
