= Pseudolaureola atlantica =

Conservation status
- Critically Endangered (IUCN 3.1)

Scientific classification
- Kingdom: Animalia
- Phylum: Arthropoda
- Clade: Pancrustacea
- Class: Malacostraca
- Order: Isopoda
- Suborder: Oniscidea
- Family: Armadillidae
- Genus: Pseudolaureola
- Species: P. atlantica

Binomial name
- Pseudolaureola atlantica (Vandel, 1977)

Synonyms
- Laureola atlantica

Species of woodlouse

Pseudolaureola atlantica, the spiky yellow woodlouse, is a species of woodlouse endemic to St. Helena's High Peak.

Unlike woodlice that forage on the forest floor, the spiky yellow woodlouse inhabits the treetops of tree fern thickets and black cabbage tree woodland, as well as black scale fern groves, found on Peaks National Park. They have also been recorded inhabiting St. Helena redwood trees. The spiky yellow woodlouse glows under UV light which has helped scientists locate them during population surveys at night.

Its numbers are in decline due to introduced species such as rats and competition with foreign woodlice. Large scale flax farming is decimating the now-reduced black cabbage tree groves that it inhabits. A captive breeding program was attempted but failed because of their need for very precise conditions, their focus has now changed from captive breeding to preservation of habitat. As of 2017, the wild population is estimated to be approximately 980, much larger than previously thought. Researchers think this may be underestimate due to limitations in reaching their canopy habitat for surveys.

Pseudolaureola atlantica probably feeds on spores and pollen.

Pseudolaureola atlantica is 1 centimeter long. It is bright yellow and covered in spines, and it has no visible dimorphism between the sexes. Its bright coloration and spines are likely used to ward off potential predators it may encounter.
