= Dwarf ebony =

Plant common name disambiguation

Dwarf ebony is a common name for two closely related plants endemic to St Helena. It is inconsistently applied, and either of the following species may be referred to as dwarf ebony, with St Helena ebony used to refer to the other:

- Trochetiopsis ebenus
- Trochetiopsis melanoxylon
