= Pseudolaureola =

- Pseudolaureola wilsmorei

Scientific classification
- Kingdom: Animalia
- Phylum: Arthropoda
- Clade: Pancrustacea
- Class: Malacostraca
- Order: Isopoda
- Suborder: Oniscidea
- Family: Armadillidae
- Genus: Pseudolaureola; Kwon, Ferrera, and Taiti, 1992

Genus of isopods

Pseudolaureola is a genus of woodlice belonging to the family Armadillidae. This genus was officially designated in 1992 by Do Heon Kwon, Franco Ferrara, and Stefano Taiti. The type specimen for this species is a Pseudolaureola atlantica from Saint Helena. There are currently four species in this genus.

== Description ==
Psuedolaureola have may spines on their dorsal side similar to other genera of Armadillidae like Calmanesia, Echinodillo, and Polyacanthus, among others. They are also able to fully conglobate and are maximum 1cm in size.

They are also one of the few genera of isopods that fluoresce under UV light.

== Distribution ==
Psuedolaureola have been found on St. Helena (P. atlantica), New Caledonia (P. deharvengi), Madagascar (P. hystrix), and in Western Australia (P. wilsmorei).

== Species ==
- Pseudolaureola atlantica formerly Laureola atlantica Vandel, 1977
- Pseudolaureola deharvengi
- Pseudolaureola hystrix formerly Akermania hystrix; Laureola hystrix (Barnard, 1958)
- Pseudolaureola wilsmorei formerly Cubaris wilsmorei; Laureola wilsmorei (Nicholls & Barnes, 1926)
