= St Helena ebony =

St Helena ebony is a common name for two closely related plants endemic to St Helena. It is inconsistently applied, and either of the following species may be referred to as St Helena ebony, with dwarf ebony used to refer to the other:

- Trochetiopsis ebenus
- Trochetiopsis melanoxylon
