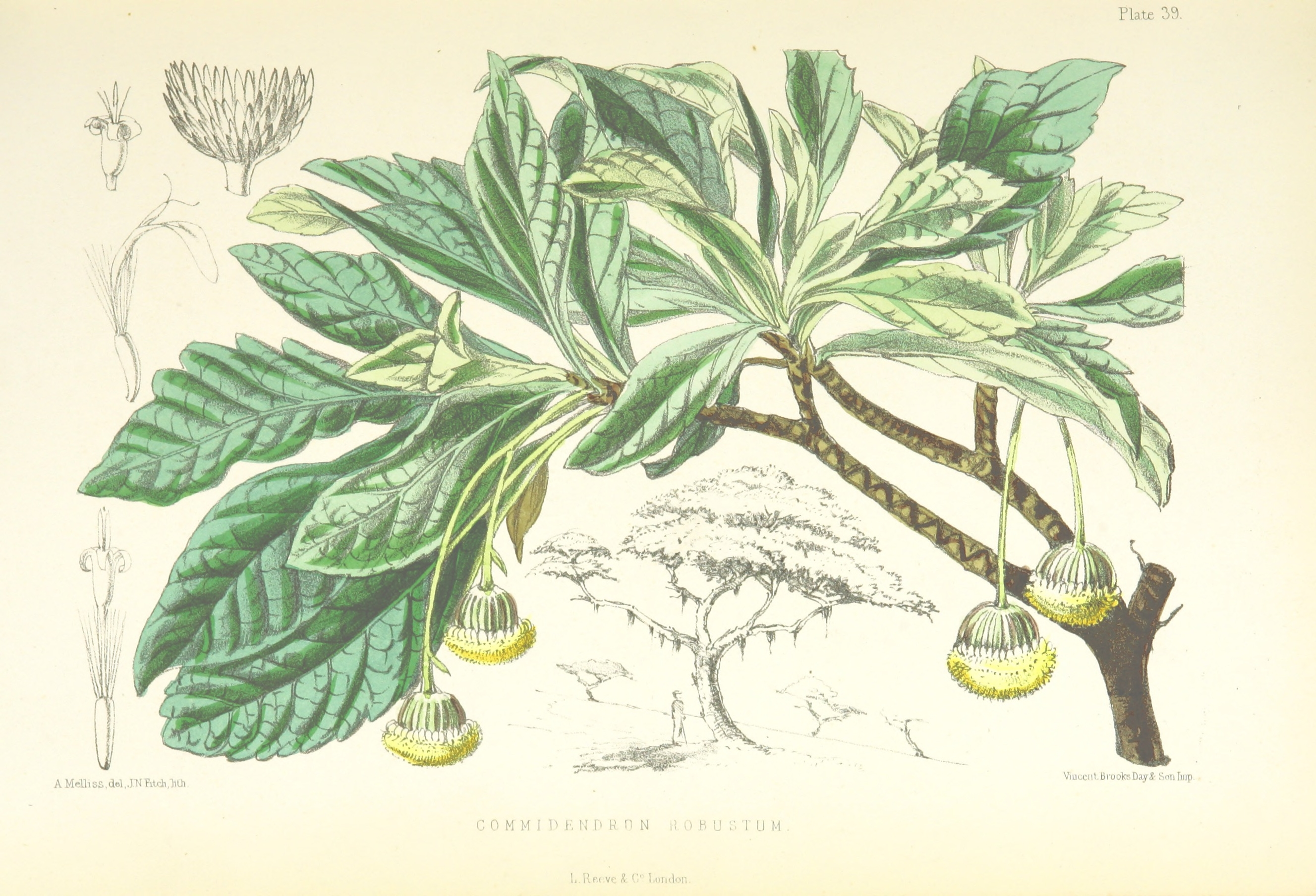

Conservation status
- Critically Endangered (IUCN 3.1)

Scientific classification
- Kingdom: Plantae
- Clade: Embryophytes
- Clade: Tracheophytes
- Clade: Spermatophytes
- Clade: Angiosperms
- Clade: Eudicots
- Clade: Asterids
- Order: Asterales
- Family: Asteraceae
- Genus: Commidendrum
- Species: C. robustum

Binomial name
- Commidendrum robustum (Roxb.) DC.

Subspecies
- C. r. subsp. gummiferum; C. r. subsp. robustum

Synonyms
- List: Aster burchellii Hook.f.; Aster gummiferus Hook.f.; Aster roxburghii Hook.f.; Commidendrum burchellii (Hook.f.) Benth. & Hook.f. ex Hemsl.; Commidendrum gummiferum (Roxb.) DC.; Conyza gummifera Roxb.; Conyza robusta Roxb.

= Commidendrum robustum =

Saint Helena gumwood

Tree species in the sunflower family

Commidendrum robustum, the Saint Helena gumwood, is a species of tree endemic to the island of Saint Helena in the British Overseas Territory of Saint Helena, Ascension and Tristan da Cunha. Though it is now comparatively rare, it was once one of the most abundant trees of mid-elevations of Saint Helena in the South Atlantic Ocean. A small tree reaching a maximum of 8 metres (26 ft) in height, it was cut extensively for fuel in the early years of settlement of the island by the English East India Company. It is one of several species in the endemic genus Commidendrum.

Commidendrum robustum is closely related to the Melanodendron integrifolium, Black cabbage tree, which also inhabits Saint Helena. The two species most likely evolved from a common ancestor. Today, the closest relatives are South African, in the small shrub genera Felicia Cass. and Amellus L.

== Description ==
Gumwood trees reach 5 to 8 metres (16 to 26 ft) in height when fully grown with an umbrella shaped canopy. However, when they first start growing they resemble a compact bush. The leaves are in whorls and usually measure 7 to 10 cm long. They have toothed edges and are dark green to dull blue-green in colour. Their texture is noticeably fleshy and they are both sticky and hairy.

The flowering heads are at the end of branches and have long dropping stalks. The ray florets are white and the disk flowers are pale yellow with the whole floral head measuring 2 to 3 centimetres across. Each flowering head will have about 180 disk flowers and 40 ray flowers.

== Taxonomy ==
Saint Helena gumwood was scientifically described by the botanist William Roxburgh 1816 and named Conyza robusta. In 1836 Augustin Pyramus de Candolle moved it to the genus Commidendrum, giving the species its accepted name. All four members of Commidendrum are endemic to Saint Helena. When Roxburgh described the species he also another species named Conyza gummifera. It was accepted until 1995 when Quentin C.B. Cronk published a book on the plants of Saint Helena where he described it as a subspecies of Commidendrum robustum. It has 7 synonyms of the species or one of its subspecies.

Table of Synonyms
Name	Year	Synonym of:	Notes
Aster burchellii Hook.f.	1870	subsp. robustum	= het.
Aster gummiferus Hook.f.	1870	subsp. gummiferum	= het.
Aster roxburghii Hook.f.	1870	subsp. robustum	= het.
Commidendrum burchellii (Hook.f.) Benth. & Hook.f. ex Hemsl.	1884	subsp. robustum	= het.
Commidendrum gummiferum (Roxb.) DC.	1836	subsp. gummiferum	≡ hom.
Conyza gummifera Roxb.	1816	subsp. gummiferum	≡ hom.
Conyza robusta Roxb.	1816	C. robustum	≡ hom.
Notes: ≡ homotypic synonym; = heterotypic synonym

== Range and habitat ==
Before humans altered the natural ecosystem the tree was a dominant component of the woodlands at elevations between 300 and 600 metres (980 and 1,970 ft) on the island. The subspecies gummiferum was the main tree in the moist gumwood woodlands of the central ridge at 500 to 650 metres. Lower down the dry gumwood woodlands occupied about a quarter of the island between 300 and 500 metres. By 1868 John Charles Melliss estimated the total number of trees in various places at just 1300 to 1400.

In the 21st century the trees are found in just two locations on Saint Helena with a total of just 679 mature individuals. The main woodland is on Peak Dale where grazing by introduced species has been restricted. The replanting of gumwoods on the Horse Point Plain was started in 1988 and continued through the 1990s. Hundreds of young trees have been planted there by the Millennium Grove Forest Project.

== Use and culture ==
When there were common the gumwood trees were extensively used as firewood. The naturalist William John Burchell wrote that it, "Has a resinous, spongy wood, making a delightful fire". The gumwood was designated the national tree of Saint Helena in 1977.

== See also ==
- Flora of Saint Helena
- Saint Helena scrub and woodlands
