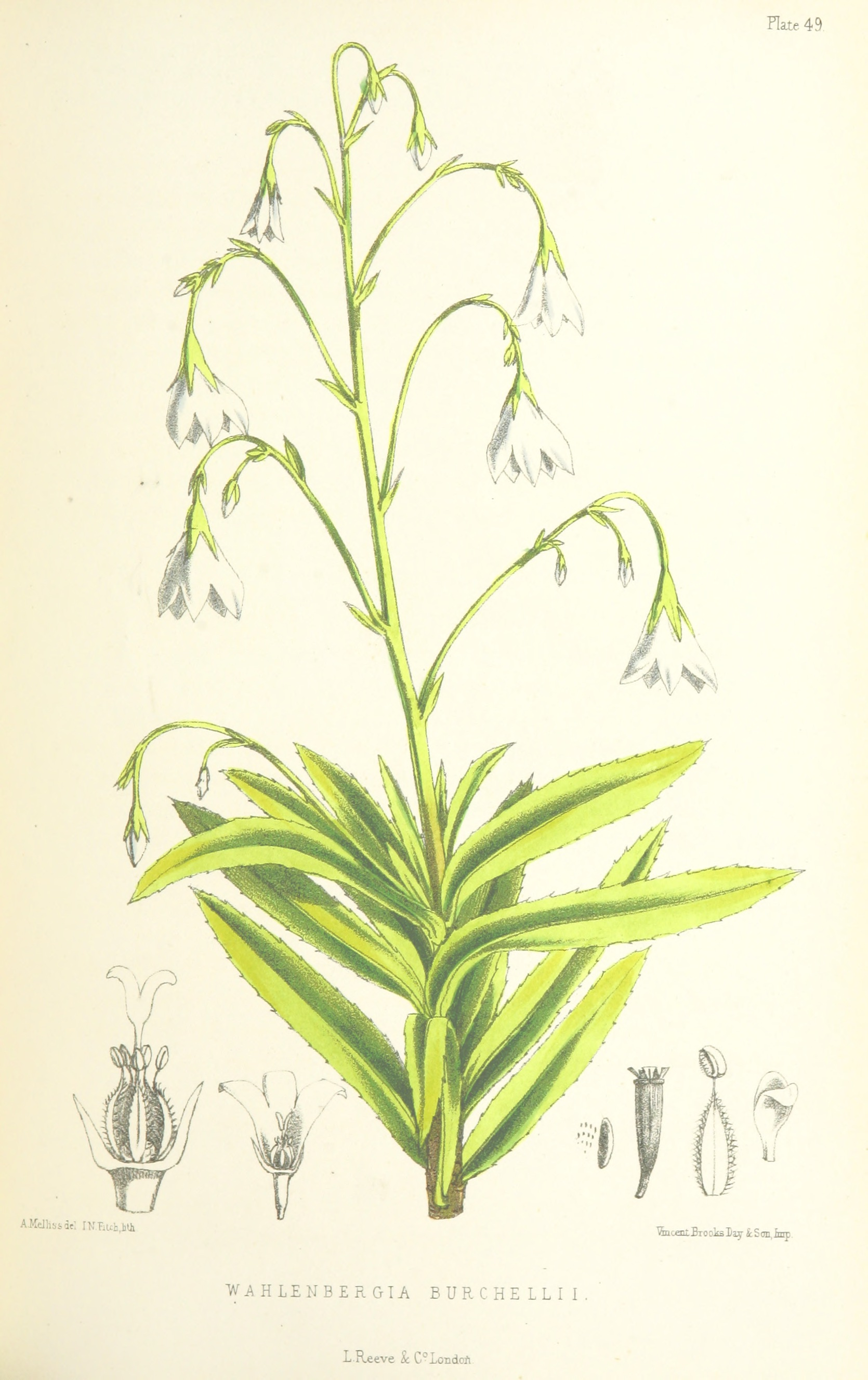
- Wahlenbergia roxburghii (Syn. Wahlenbergia burchellii)

Conservation status
- Extinct (1872) (IUCN 3.1)

Scientific classification
- Kingdom: Plantae
- Clade: Tracheophytes
- Clade: Angiosperms
- Clade: Eudicots
- Clade: Asterids
- Order: Asterales
- Family: Campanulaceae
- Genus: Wahlenbergia
- Species: †W. roxburghii

Binomial name
- †Wahlenbergia roxburghii A.DC.

= Wahlenbergia roxburghii =

Extinct species of flowering plant

Wahlenbergia roxburghii, the Roxburgh bellflower or dwarf cabbage tree, is an extinct member of a group of four species of Wahlenbergia once known from the island of Saint Helena, in the South Atlantic Ocean. It was last seen by naturalist John Charles Melliss in 1872. William Roxburgh recorded it in the thick forests on the south face of Diana's Peak. De Candolle notes it in dense woods around Diana's Peak and Halley's Mount. Burchell notes it 'On Sandy Bay ridge near Taylor's. Flowering: probably August to March. It was exceedingly rare in Meliss's time, it is not in his book as he had not found it. It was probably the increase of Phormium tenax planting on the ridge that pushed Wahlenbergia roxburghii into final extinction. It is an example of one of the early extinctions of Saint Helena plants as a result of human activity, with a history similar to that of the stringwood (Acalypha rubrinervis).

== See also ==
- Flora of St Helena
