= Heliotropium pannifolium =

Saint Helena heliotrope

Conservation status
- Extinct (c. 1820) (IUCN 3.1)

Scientific classification
- Kingdom: Plantae
- Clade: Embryophytes
- Clade: Tracheophytes
- Clade: Spermatophytes
- Clade: Angiosperms
- Clade: Eudicots
- Clade: Asterids
- Order: Boraginales
- Family: Heliotropiaceae
- Genus: Heliotropium
- Species: †H. pannifolium

Binomial name
- †Heliotropium pannifolium Burch. ex Hemsl.

Extinct species of plant in the borage family

Heliotropium pannifolium, the Saint Helena heliotrope, is now extinct but was formerly a hairy-leaved small shrub. It grew to a height of up to 1 m (3 ft 3 in). It was only seen once, by the explorer W. Burchell in Broad Gut, Saint Helena (c. 1808) and has never been seen again. Human impact on the island of Saint Helena was severe and the Saint Helena heliotrope is one of several extinct plants from that island.

== See also ==
- Flora of Saint Helena
- Saint Helena scrub and woodlands
