= Senecio leucadendron =

Scientific classification
- Kingdom: Plantae
- Clade: Embryophytes
- Clade: Tracheophytes
- Clade: Spermatophytes
- Clade: Angiosperms
- Clade: Eudicots
- Clade: Asterids
- Order: Asterales
- Family: Asteraceae
- Genus: Senecio
- Species: S. leucadendron

Binomial name
- Senecio leucadendron (G.Forst.) Hemsl.

Synonyms
- Solidago leucadendron G.Forst.

Species of flowering plant

Senecio leucadendron is a species of flowering plant in the family Asteraceae, endemic to Saint Helena. It was first described by Georg Forster in 1789 as Solidago leucadendron.

(Senecio leucadendron Benth. & Hook.f. is an invalid name that refers to a different species, Pladaroxylon leucadendron.)
