= Cabbage palm =

Cabbage palm is a common name for several species of palms or palm-like plants:

- Cordyline fruticosa, a tropical tree native to Asia and Polynesia
- Corypha utan, an East Asian fan palm (including Northern Australia)
- Euterpe oleracea, a Brazilian palm tree
- Livistona australis, an Australian palm
- Roystonea oleracea, a Caribbean palm
- Sabal palmetto, native to the south-eastern USA, Cuba and the Bahamas

== See also ==
- Cabbage tree
