= Carex dianae =

Conservation status
- Least Concern (IUCN 3.1)

Scientific classification
- Kingdom: Plantae
- Clade: Embryophytes
- Clade: Tracheophytes
- Clade: Spermatophytes
- Clade: Angiosperms
- Clade: Monocots
- Clade: Commelinids
- Order: Poales
- Family: Cyperaceae
- Genus: Carex
- Species: C. dianae

Binomial name
- Carex dianae Steud.

Synonyms
- Carex pedunculata Willd. ex Roxb.

Species of plant

Carex dianae (common name, Diana's Peak Grass) is a tussock-forming species of perennial sedge in the family Cyperaceae. It is native to St Helena.

== Description ==
Carex dianae is a tussock-forming, grasslike, perennial plant with small flowers which are grouped into spikes and grows in impoverished, rocky terrain.

== See also ==
- List of Carex species
