= Acalypha rubrinervis =

String tree

Conservation status
- Extinct (ca. 1860) (IUCN 3.1)

Scientific classification
- Kingdom: Plantae
- Clade: Embryophytes
- Clade: Tracheophytes
- Clade: Spermatophytes
- Clade: Angiosperms
- Clade: Eudicots
- Clade: Rosids
- Order: Malpighiales
- Family: Euphorbiaceae
- Subtribe: Acalyphinae
- Genus: Acalypha
- Species: †A. rubrinervis

Binomial name
- †Acalypha rubrinervis Cronk
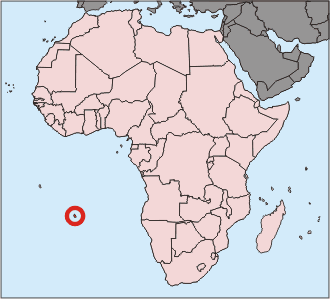
- Location of St Helena

Extinct species of flowering plant

Acalypha rubrinervis (string tree or stringwood) is an extinct plant in the spurge family (Euphorbiaceae), from the island of Saint Helena in the South Atlantic Ocean. It was called string tree on account of the thin pendulous inflorescences which resembled red strings. Disturbance following human settlement on the island destroyed its habitat, and it was last seen in the 19th century. It is thus one of a number of island plants to have been driven to extinction by human activity (see List of extinct plants).

The genus to which it belongs, Acalypha, is a large one and includes island endemics as well as weeds and ornamentals. A. rubrinervis was a shrub or thicket growing on the central ridge of St Helena above 600 m elevation.

Acalypha rubrinervis is a shrub or small tree, 1–2 m. Branches with warty leaf-scars. Leaves ovate to broadly triangular-ovate, entire to somewhat wavy-toothed, with 3 veins from the base of the leaf blade 5-7 x 3–5 cm, leaf stalk 2–6 cm. Leaf stalk and veins red. Inflorescence a long spike, male part up to 20 cm, thread-like, gracefully pendulous.

Acalypha rubrinervis is closely related to Acalypha reticulata of the Seychelles, Madagascar, Comoros, Mauritius and Reunion, but it is quite distinct from that species in general appearance, leaf shape, the red colouring, smoot carpels and the very large female bracts. Acalypha reticulata is immensely variable and has been classified into numerous varieties but none has been seen approaching Acalypha rubrinervis. Dr William Roxburgh remarked that it was a beautiful small tree, a native of elevated parts of the south face of Diana's Peak, called the string-tree on account of its numerous beautiful red male spikes, which were hanging in great profusion from every twig. William John Burchell noted it flowering in April and May.

== See also ==
- Flora of St Helena
