= Eragrostis episcopulus =

Conservation status
- Critically Endangered (IUCN 3.1)

Scientific classification
- Kingdom: Plantae
- Clade: Embryophytes
- Clade: Tracheophytes
- Clade: Spermatophytes
- Clade: Angiosperms
- Clade: Monocots
- Clade: Commelinids
- Order: Poales
- Family: Poaceae
- Subfamily: Chloridoideae
- Genus: Eragrostis
- Species: E. episcopulus

Binomial name
- Eragrostis episcopulus Lambdon, Darlow, Clubbe & Cope

Species of grass

Eragrostis episcopulus, the cliff hair grass, is a species of grass endemic to St. Helena. The species is classified as Critically Endangered because of its extremely restricted range and population fragmentation.

== Distribution ==
It is found on cliffs of St. Helena, at 250 to 550 m (820 to 1,800 ft) above sea level.
