= Cabbage Tree Island =

Cabbage Tree Island may refer to three locations in New South Wales, Australia:

- Cabbage Tree Island, New South Wales, a settlement in Ballina Shire
- Cabbage Tree Island (John Gould Nature Reserve), an island and nature reserve near Port Stephens
- Cabbage Tree Island, an island in the Manning River in Entrance State Park, NSW
