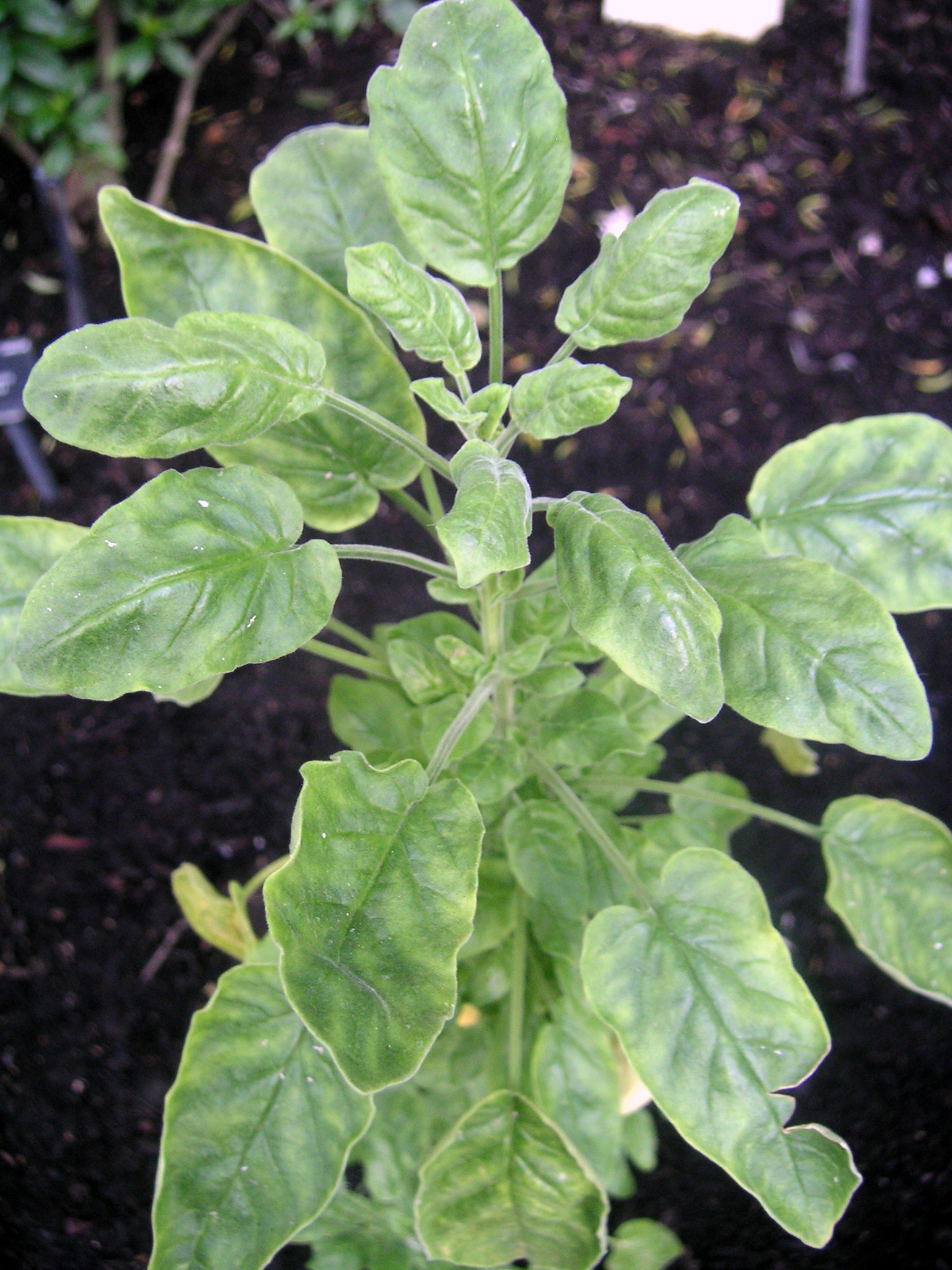

Conservation status
- Critically Endangered (IUCN 2.3)

Scientific classification
- Kingdom: Plantae
- Clade: Embryophytes
- Clade: Tracheophytes
- Clade: Spermatophytes
- Clade: Angiosperms
- Clade: Eudicots
- Clade: Asterids
- Order: Solanales
- Family: Solanaceae
- Subfamily: Solanoideae
- Tribe: Physaleae
- Genus: Mellissia; Hook.f. (1867)
- Species: M. begoniifolia

Binomial name
- Mellissia begoniifolia (Roxb.) Hook.f. (1867)

Synonyms
- Physalis begoniifolia Roxb. (1816); Withania begoniifolia (Roxb.) Hunz. & Barboza (1995)

= Mellissia =

Saint Helena boxwood

Genus of flowering plants

Mellissia was formerly a monotypic genus in the family Solanaceae with the single species, Mellissia begoniifolia (Saint Helena boxwood), endemic to the island of Saint Helena. It was named by Joseph Dalton Hooker in honour of John Charles Melliss, a 19th-century engineer and amateur naturalist who worked on Saint Helena.

The plant formerly known as Mellissia begoniifolia is notable for the subcampanulate calyx which encloses the white corolla, and is strongly accrescent in fruit, as in certain species of Physalis e.g. Physalis philadelphica. Like Physalis, the species belongs to tribe Physaleae of the Solanaceae, but (within that tribe) to subtribe Withaninae, not Physalinae.

The plant was long thought to be extinct but a small population was discovered in 1998 by Stedson Stroud. As of 2011, it was considered "effectively extinct in the wild" by experts at Kew Botanical Garden because there were no longer any flowering plants left in the wild. Only one adult plant was left by 2010, and it was under extreme stress due to drought and pests. That plant died, but some seedlings sprouted from 2011 rains. Eight surviving plants in 2012 have died out as well, and only 1–3 plants had survived by 2014. The species is kept alive at Kew's greenhouses in preparation for eventual re-introduction to its natural habitat.

== See also ==
- Flora of St Helena
