= Euphorbia heleniana =

Conservation status
- Critically Endangered (IUCN 3.1)

Scientific classification
- Kingdom: Plantae
- Clade: Embryophytes
- Clade: Tracheophytes
- Clade: Spermatophytes
- Clade: Angiosperms
- Clade: Eudicots
- Clade: Rosids
- Order: Malpighiales
- Family: Euphorbiaceae
- Genus: Euphorbia
- Species: E. heleniana

Binomial name
- Euphorbia heleniana Thell. & Stapf

Species of plant

Euphorbia heleniana or French grass or Saint Helena spurge is a herbaceous plant, a member of the Euphorbiaceae family.

== Distribution ==
It is an endemic species to Saint Helena.

== Taxonomy ==
It was named by Albert Thellung and Otto Stapf, in Bull. Misc. Inform. Kew 1916: 201 in 1916.
