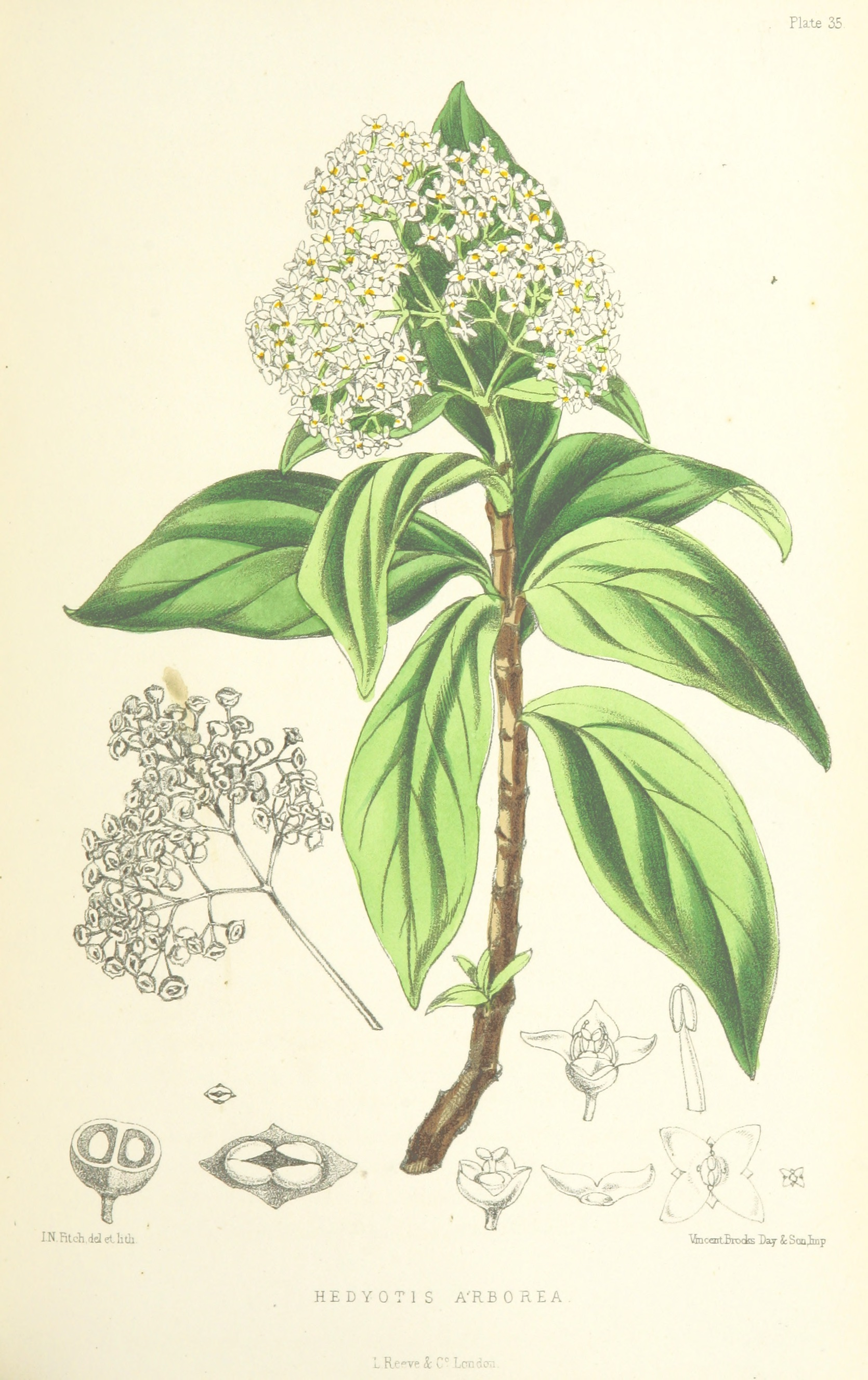

Conservation status
- Critically Endangered (IUCN 3.1)

Scientific classification
- Kingdom: Plantae
- Clade: Embryophytes
- Clade: Tracheophytes
- Clade: Spermatophytes
- Clade: Angiosperms
- Clade: Eudicots
- Clade: Asterids
- Order: Gentianales
- Family: Rubiaceae
- Subfamily: Rubioideae
- Tribe: Spermacoceae
- Genus: Nesohedyotis (Hook.f.) Bremek.
- Species: N. arborea

Binomial name
- Nesohedyotis arborea (Roxb.) Bremek.

Synonyms
- Hedyotis arborea Roxb.; Oldenlandia arborea (Roxb.) K.Schum.

= Nesohedyotis =

St Helena dogwood

Genus of plants

Nesohedyotis is a genus of flowering plants endemic to the island of Saint Helena in the South Atlantic Ocean. It in the family Rubiaceae (the family that includes coffee).

It is a monotypic genus containing the single species Nesohedyotis arborea (Roxb.) Bremek., which grows on the central ridge of the island. It is known commonly as the St. Helena dogwood. The vernacular name recalls the similarity between its inflorescences and those of Cornus species, the dogwoods of Europe and North America. Although it is one of the commoner endemic species on Saint Helena its small population size and small geographical distribution make it endangered.

This species is a small, erect tree growing up to 7 meters tall. The leaves are oppositely arranged. They are lance-shaped with a pointed, downcurved "drip tip". The white flowers are 3 or 4 millimeters wide and the fruit is a brown or black capsule.

This tree is a keystone species in the thickets of the island. The leaves collect mist, which condenses and falls from the "drip tips" into the vegetation below, providing water.

== See also ==
- Flora of St Helena
