= Stefano Taiti =

Italian zoologist

- Education: University of Florence
- Scientific career
- Fields: Terrestrial Isopod Taxonomy
- Workplaces: Italian National Research Council
- Author abbrev. (zoology): Taiti

Stefano Taiti is an Italian isopod taxonomist who focuses on Oniscidea. He obtained the degree of Doctor in biology from the University of Florence. Taiti is currently an associate researcher at the Research Institute on Terrestrial Ecosystem of the Italian National Research Council in Florence. He is also a professor at the University of Florence. His main research interests are taxonomy, phylogeny, biogeography, functional morphology and ecology of terrestrial isopods.

== Professional leadership ==
Taiti is editor-in-chief of the Journal Tropical Zoology, an editor of Oniscidea submissions for the journal ZooKeys, and was an editor for the Oniscidea of the World Register of Marine Species until 2024. He was the vice-president of the International Society of Subterranean Biology from 2014 to 2016. He is also a member of several specialist groups including the Atlantic Islands Invertebrate Specialist Group.

== Bibliography ==
Taiti has authored or co-authored over 200 scientific articles and 10 books including many foundational works in the field of isopod taxonomy. He has described 445 species and 65 genera of terrestrial isopods as of 2026.

=== Books ===
- Strus, J.; Taiti, S.; Sfenthourakis, Spyros (2012). Advances in Terrestrial Isopod Biology. ZooKeys. ISBN 9789546426307.

=== Selected academic publications ===
- Sfenthourakis, S; Taiti, S (2015). "Patterns of taxonomic diversity among terrestrial isopods". ZooKeys (515): 13–25. Bibcode:2015ZooK..515...13S. doi:10.3897/zookeys.515.9332. PMC 4525032. PMID 26261437.
- Soares Campos-Filho, I.; Araujo, P. B.; Bichuette, M. E.; Trajano, E.; Taiti, S. (2014). "Terrestrial isopods (Crustacea: Isopoda: Oniscidea) from Brazilian caves". Zoological Journal of the Linnean Society. 172 (2): 360–425. doi:10.1111/zoj.12172.

== Eponyms ==
Several isopod species have been named in honour of Taiti:

- Burmoniscus taitii Kwon & Kim, 2002
- Caucasocyphoniscus taitii Gongalsky, 2022
- Exalloniscus taitii Li & Jiang, 2024
- Stenasellus taitii Messana & Argano, 2019
- Stygocyathura taitii Argano & Messana, 2019
