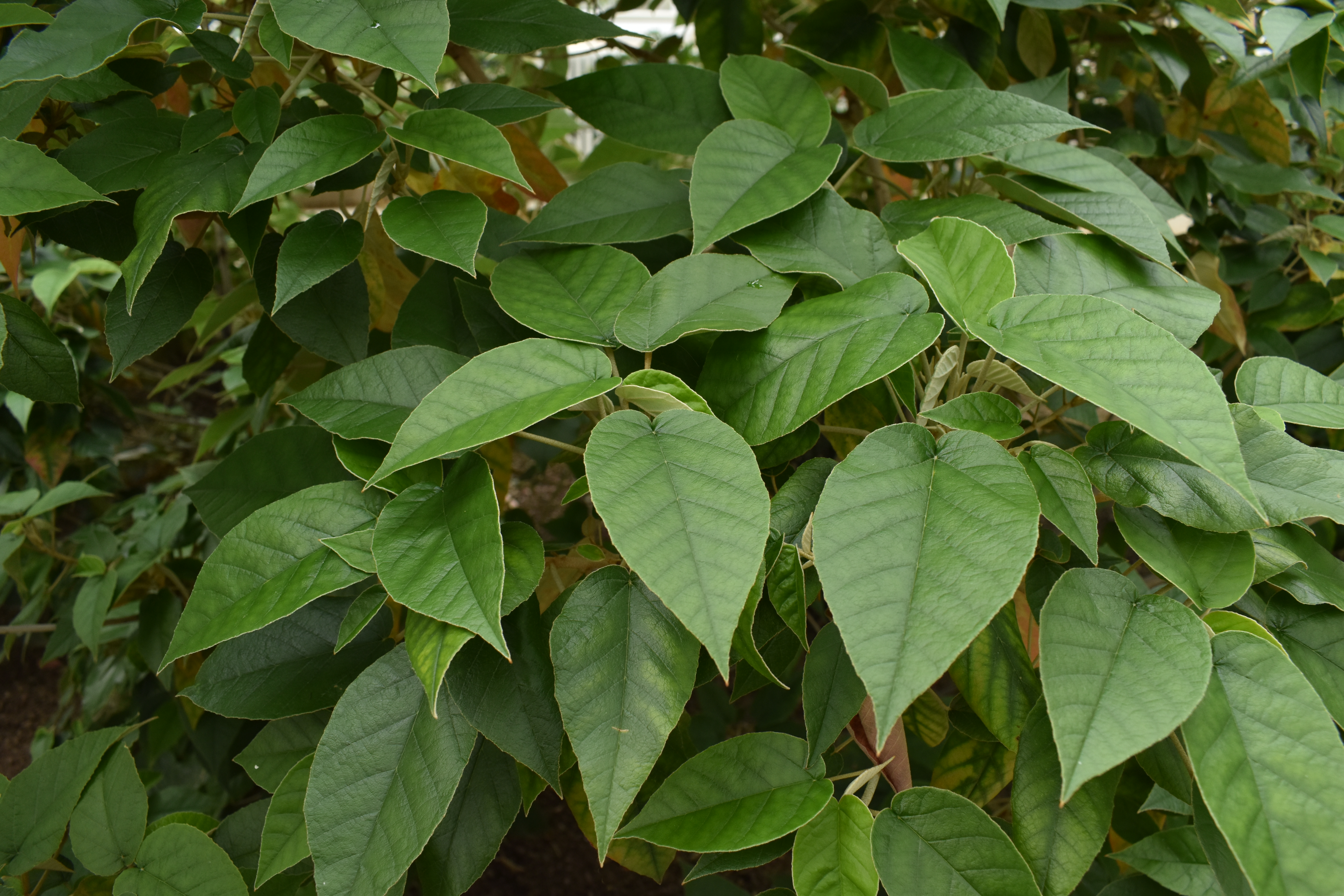

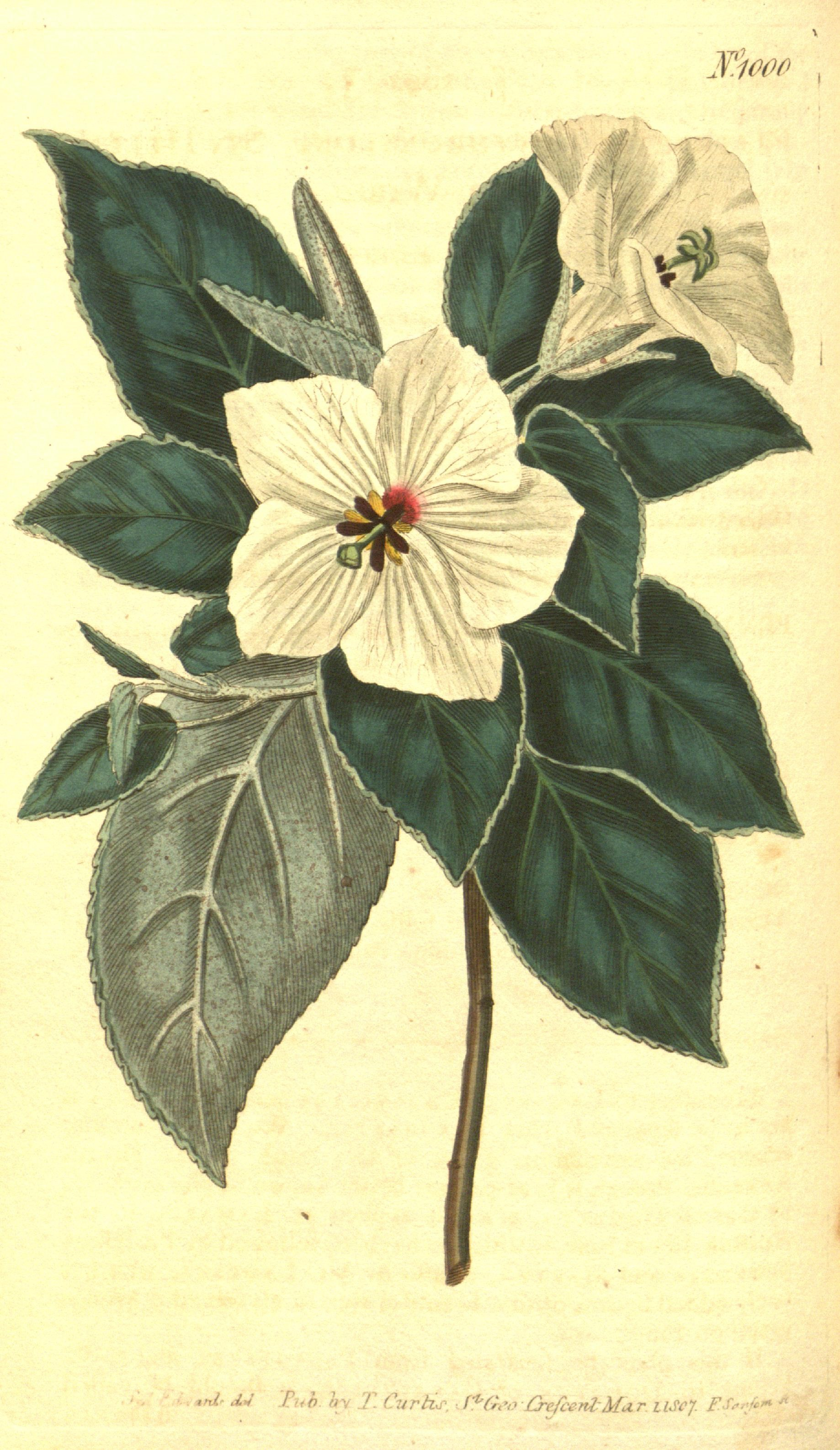

Conservation status
- Extinct in the Wild (IUCN 3.1)

Scientific classification
- Kingdom: Plantae
- Clade: Embryophytes
- Clade: Tracheophytes
- Clade: Spermatophytes
- Clade: Angiosperms
- Clade: Eudicots
- Clade: Rosids
- Order: Malvales
- Family: Malvaceae
- Genus: Melhania
- Species: M. erythroxylon

Binomial name
- Melhania erythroxylon (G.Forst.) R.Br.

Synonyms
- Assonia erythroxylon (G.Forst.) Sims; Dombeya erythroxylon (G.Forst.) Willd.; Pentapetes erythroxylon G.Forst.; Trochetia erythroxylon (G.Forst.) Benth.; Trochetiopsis erythroxylon (G.Forst.) Marais

= Melhania erythroxylon =

Saint Helena redwood

Species of flowering plant

Melhania erythroxylon, the Saint Helena redwood, is a species of flowering plant endemic to Saint Helena. It is a shrub or tree that is now extinct in the wild. This species has pendant flowers, petals that turn pink with age, and white staminodes.

It was formerly abundant enough in the upland parts of the island for early settlers in the 17th century to use the timber to make their homes. It became extinct in the 1950s due to deforestation as its habitat was cleared to make way for pasture, timber and fuel. The St. Helena redwood was used as an early example of ex situ conservation when the governor of Saint Helena obtained a couple seedlings and planted them in his garden. It now exists in cultivation, although cultivated stock is weak.

Saint Helena redwood is completely unrelated to the redwood tree of California and other trees called redwood.

Melhania × benjaminii is a naturally-occurring hybrid of M. erythroxylon and the related Saint Helena ebony (Melhania ebenus), is now often planted on the island.

The species was first described as Pentapetes erythroxylon by Georg Forster in 1789. In 1812 Robert Brown placed the species in genus Melhania as M. erythroxylon.

== See also ==
- Flora of Saint Helena
- Saint Helena scrub and woodlands
