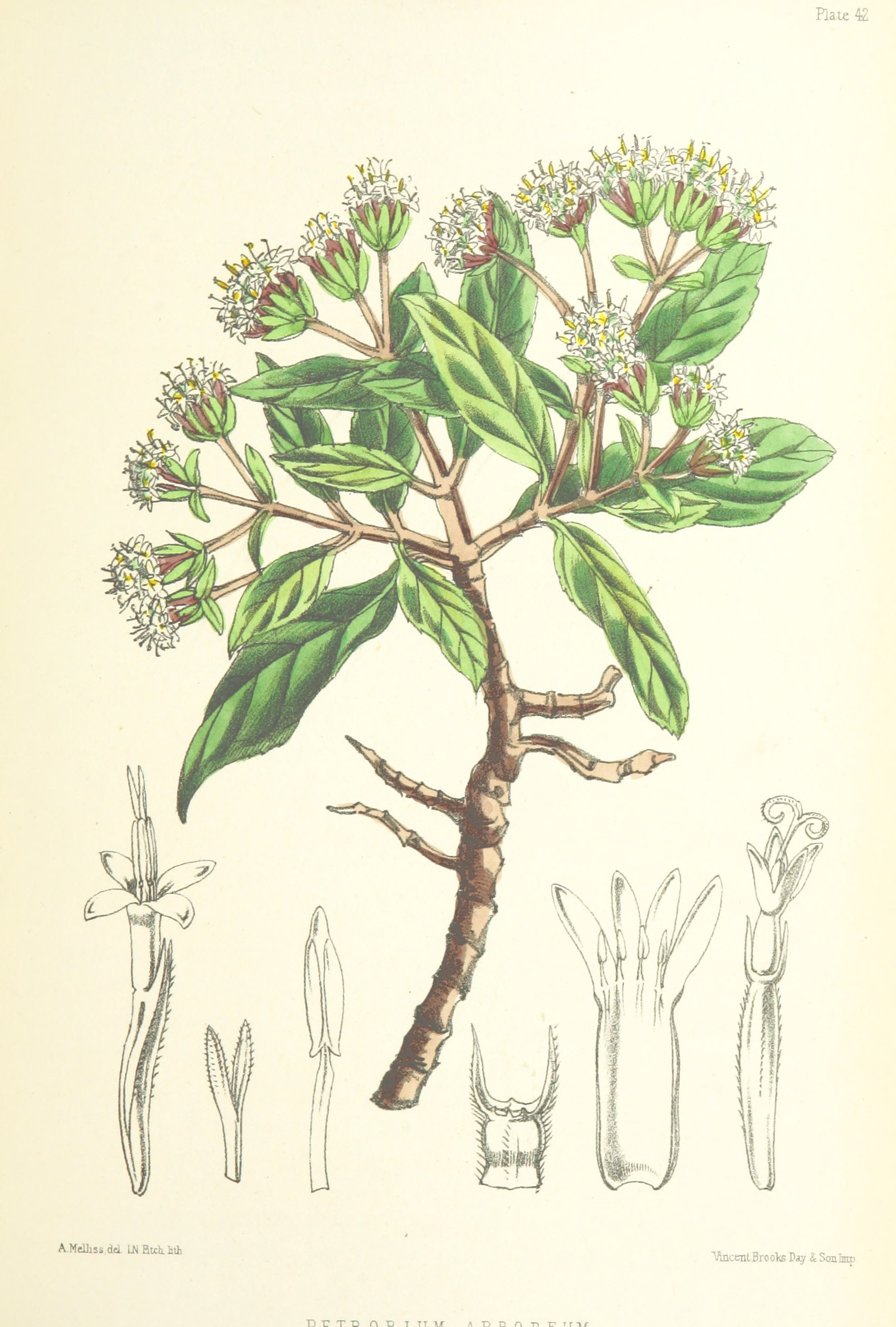
- Petrobium arboreum

Conservation status
- Endangered (IUCN 3.1)

Scientific classification
- Kingdom: Plantae
- Clade: Embryophytes
- Clade: Tracheophytes
- Clade: Spermatophytes
- Clade: Angiosperms
- Clade: Eudicots
- Clade: Asterids
- Order: Asterales
- Family: Asteraceae
- Subfamily: Asteroideae
- Tribe: Coreopsideae
- Genus: Petrobium; R.Br. 1818 not Bong. 1838 (Melastomataceae)
- Species: P. arboreum

Binomial name
- Petrobium arboreum (J.R.Forst. & G.Forst.) R.Br. ex Spreng.

Synonyms
- Drimyphyllum Burch. ex DC.; Laxmannia J.R.Forst. & G.Forst. 1776, rejected name, not R.Br. 1810 (Asparagaceae) nor Schreb. 1791 (Rutaceae) nor S.G.Gmel. ex Trin. 1818 (Rubiaceae); Pharetranthus Klatt; Bidens arborea (J.R.Forst. & G.Forst.) Roxb.; Drimyphyllum helenianum Burch. ex DC., pro syn.; Laxmannia arborea J.R.Forst. & G.Forst.; Petrobium forsteri Cass., nom. illeg. superfl.; Pharetranthus ferrugineus Klatt; Spilanthes arborea (J.R.Forst. & G.Forst.) G.Forst.; Spilanthes pseudogummifera G.Forst. ex DC.; Spilanthes tetrandra Roxb.

= Petrobium =

Genus of flowering plants

Petrobium is a genus in the family Asteraceae.

The only known species is Petrobium arboreum, called Saint Helena whitewood. It is found in the tree-fern thicket at the top of the central ridge of island of Saint Helena in the South Atlantic Ocean. The plants are either female or hermaphrodite, i.e. the species is gynodioecious.

== See also ==
- Flora of St Helena
