= Melhania ebenus =

Conservation status
- Critically Endangered (IUCN 3.1)

Scientific classification
- Kingdom: Plantae
- Clade: Embryophytes
- Clade: Tracheophytes
- Clade: Spermatophytes
- Clade: Angiosperms
- Clade: Eudicots
- Clade: Rosids
- Order: Malvales
- Family: Malvaceae
- Genus: Melhania
- Species: M. ebenus

Binomial name
- Melhania ebenus (Cronk) Dorr

Synonyms
- Trochetiopsis ebenus Cronk

Species of flowering plant

Melhania ebenus, the dwarf ebony or Saint Helena ebony, is a species of flowering plant that is endemic to the island of Saint Helena in the southern Atlantic Ocean. It is a shrub or tree with staminodes that are dark maroon or "black". It is not related to the ebony of commerce (Diospyros spp.), but is instead a member of the mallow family, Malvaceae. Saint Helena ebony is now critically endangered in the wild, being reduced to two wild individuals on a cliff, but old roots are sometimes found washed out of eroding slopes (relicts of its former abundance). These are collected on the island and used for inlay work, an important craft on Saint Helena. A related species, Melhania melanoxylon, is now completely extinct.

It can be propagated from cuttings, and many island gardens now boast a fine ebony bush. It is related to the Saint Helena redwood (Melhania erythroxylon), and a hybrid between them (Melhania × benjaminii) is also now often planted.

The species was first described as Trochetiopsis ebenus by Quentin Cronk in 1995. In 2020 Laurence J. Dorr placed the species in genus Melhania as M. ebenus.

== See also ==
- Flora of Saint Helena
- Saint Helena scrub and woodlands
