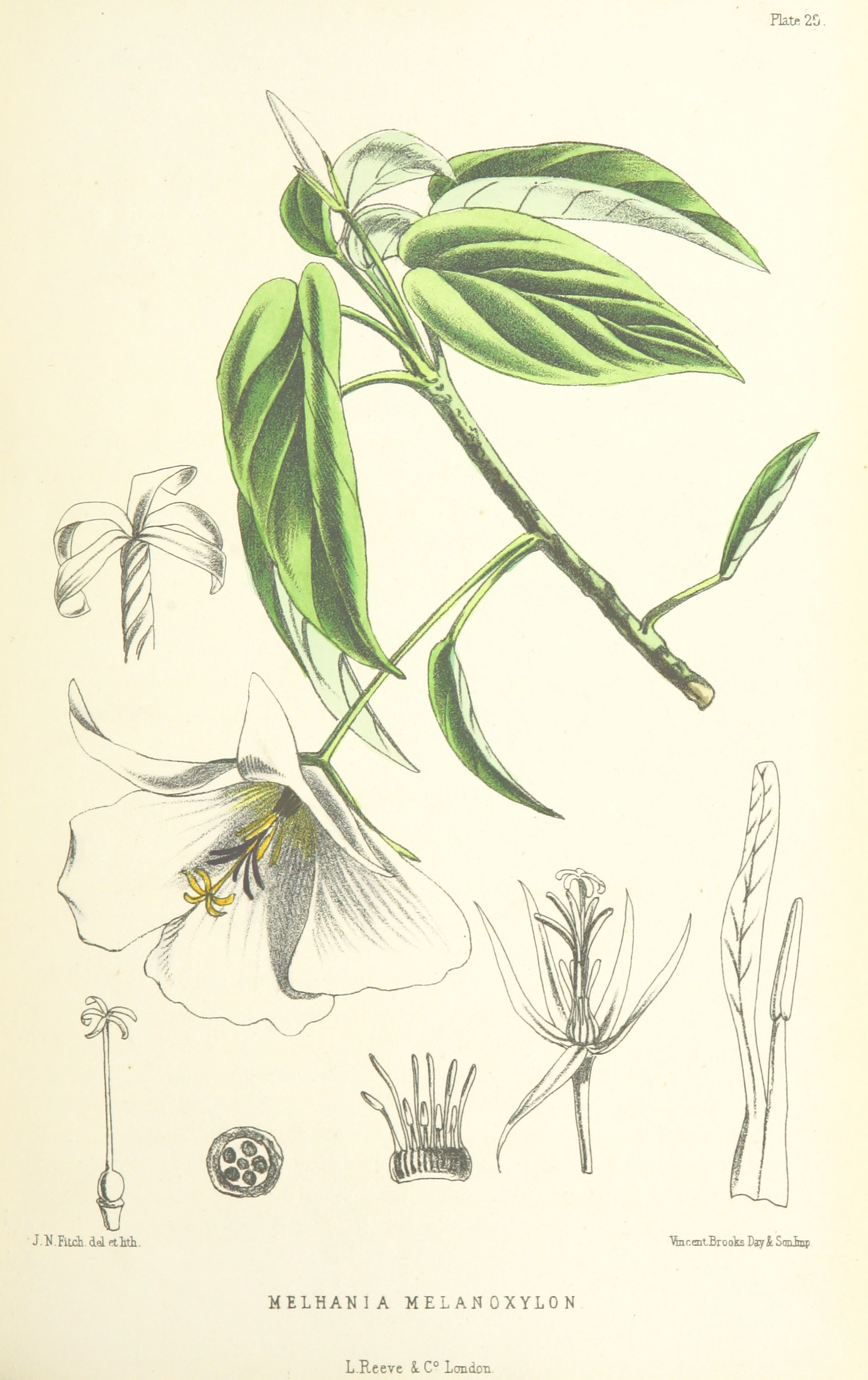

Conservation status
- Extinct (1771) (IUCN 3.1)

Scientific classification
- Kingdom: Plantae
- Clade: Tracheophytes
- Clade: Angiosperms
- Clade: Eudicots
- Clade: Rosids
- Order: Malvales
- Family: Malvaceae
- Genus: Melhania
- Species: †M. melanoxylon

Binomial name
- †Melhania melanoxylon (Sol. ex Sims) Marais

Synonyms
- Dombeya melanoxylon (Sol. ex Sims) Roxb.; Pentapetes melanoxylon Sol. ex Sims; Trochetia melanoxylon (Sol. ex Sims) Benth.; Trochetiopsis melanoxylon (Sol. ex Sims) Marais

= Melhania melanoxylon =

Extinct species of flowering plant

Melhania melanoxylon, the dwarf ebony or St Helena ebony, of the island of Saint Helena is related to Melhania ebenus but is now extinct. It differed from M. ebenus by having much smaller flowers, sepals hairless on their interior surfaces and leaves densely hairy on both surfaces (M. ebenus is densely hairy only on the lower surfaces of the leaves).

It was last seen when it was collected by Banks and Solander in 1771 on Cook's first voyage. It may once have covered many of the driest slopes of Saint Helena, but appears to have been one of the first casualties of the introduction of the domestic goat by the Portuguese sailors soon after the discovery of Saint Helena in 1502.

Samples were collected in 1701 and 1702 by Stephen Poirier. The species was first formally described by John Sims in 1807. In 1812 Robert Brown placed the species in genus Melhania as M. melanoxylon.

One of the few known samples of M. melanoxylon, collected in 1701. Currently held by Oxford University Herbaria.

== See also ==
- Flora of Saint Helena
- Saint Helena scrub and woodlands
