= Diana's Peak =

Mountain on the island of Saint Helena

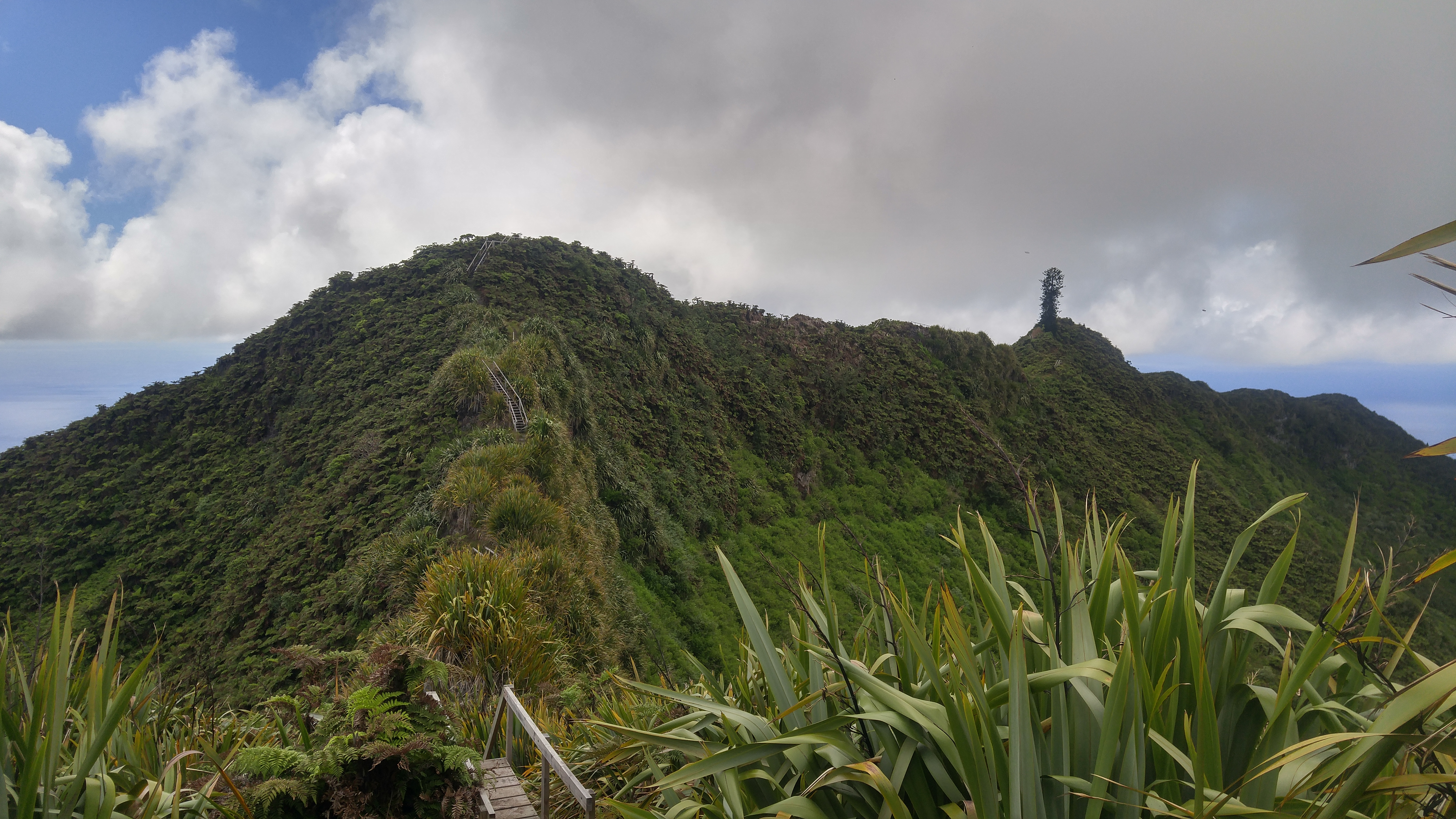
- Diana's Peak and Cuckold's Point

Highest point
- Elevation: 818 m (2,684 ft)
- Prominence: 818 m (2,684 ft)
- Coordinates: 15°57′35″S 5°41′29″W

Geography
- Location: Saint Helena, South Atlantic Ocean

Diana's Peak is the highest point, at 818 metres (2,684 ft), on the island of Saint Helena, a British overseas territory in the South Atlantic Ocean. It is of volcanic origin. The mountain and its surroundings with a total area of 81 ha were proclaimed a national park in March 1996, the first on the island. It is a preserve of several endangered endemic species, including tree fern, he cabbage and black cabbage trees, and whitewood. The park contains walking paths connecting the peaks - Mt. Actaeon (814m), Diana's Peak and Cuckold's Point (815m). The two shorter peaks are topped by large Norfolk pines. On the northern slopes there is a nursery for endemic species.

The peak is located at the tripoint where the districts of Sandy Bay (southwest), Levelwood (east) and Longwood (north) meet. The closest settlements are Bamboo Hedge (the main settlement of Sandy Bay District), Hutt's Gate (in Longwood District) and Levelwood Village.

== Gallery ==
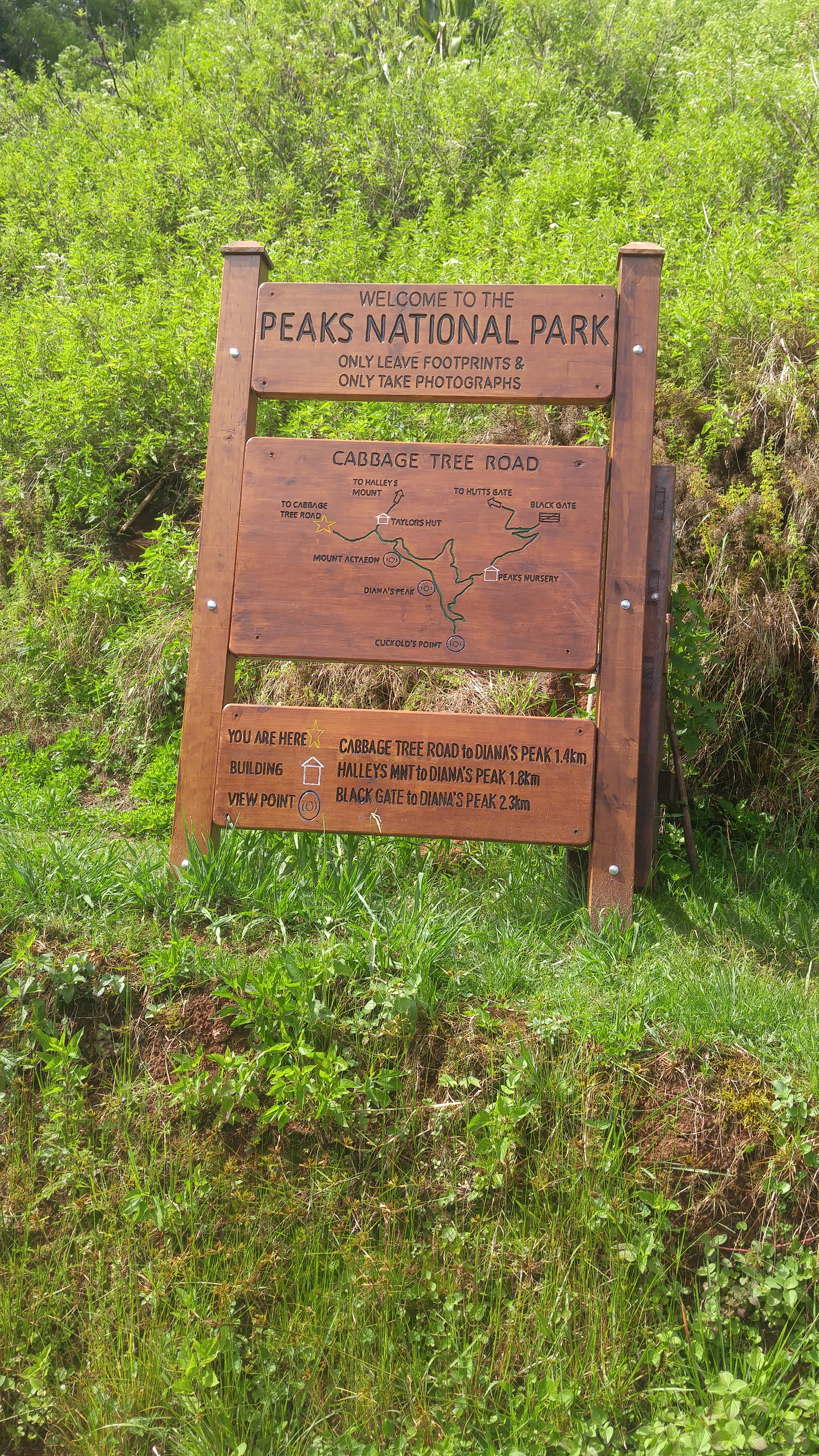
Sign at the beginning of the path

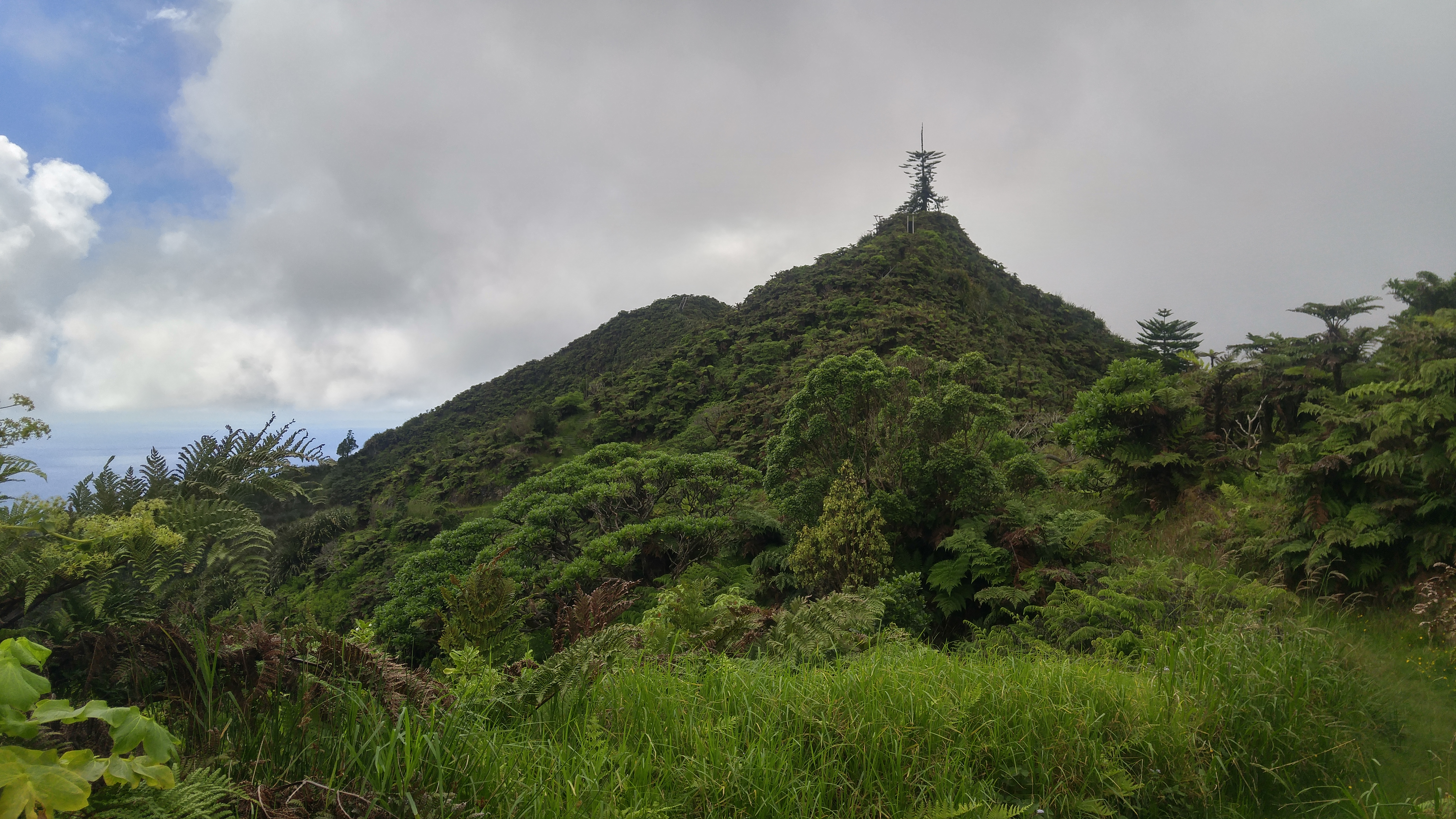
Mount Actaeon, topped by a Norfolk pine

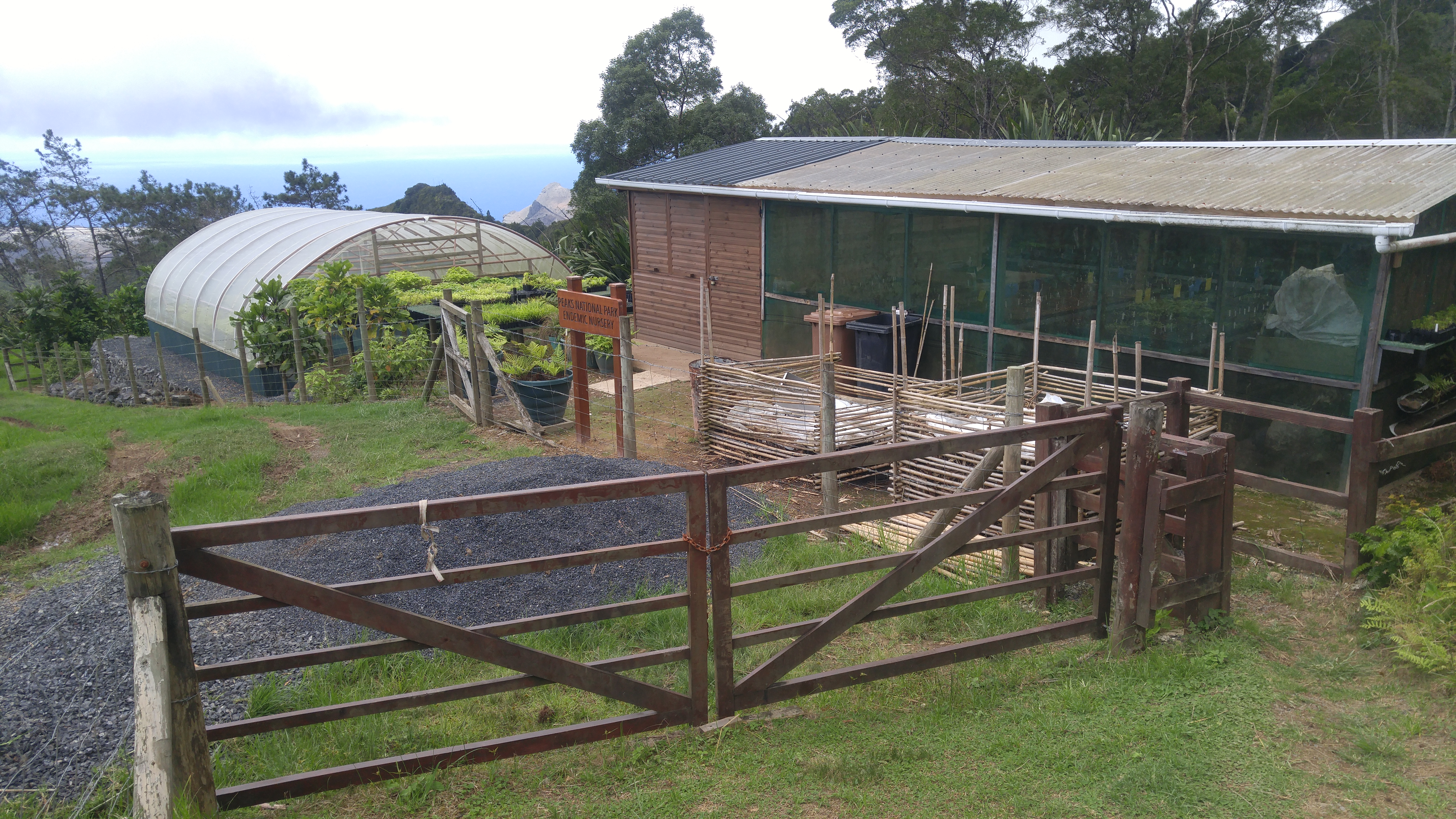
The endemic plant nursery

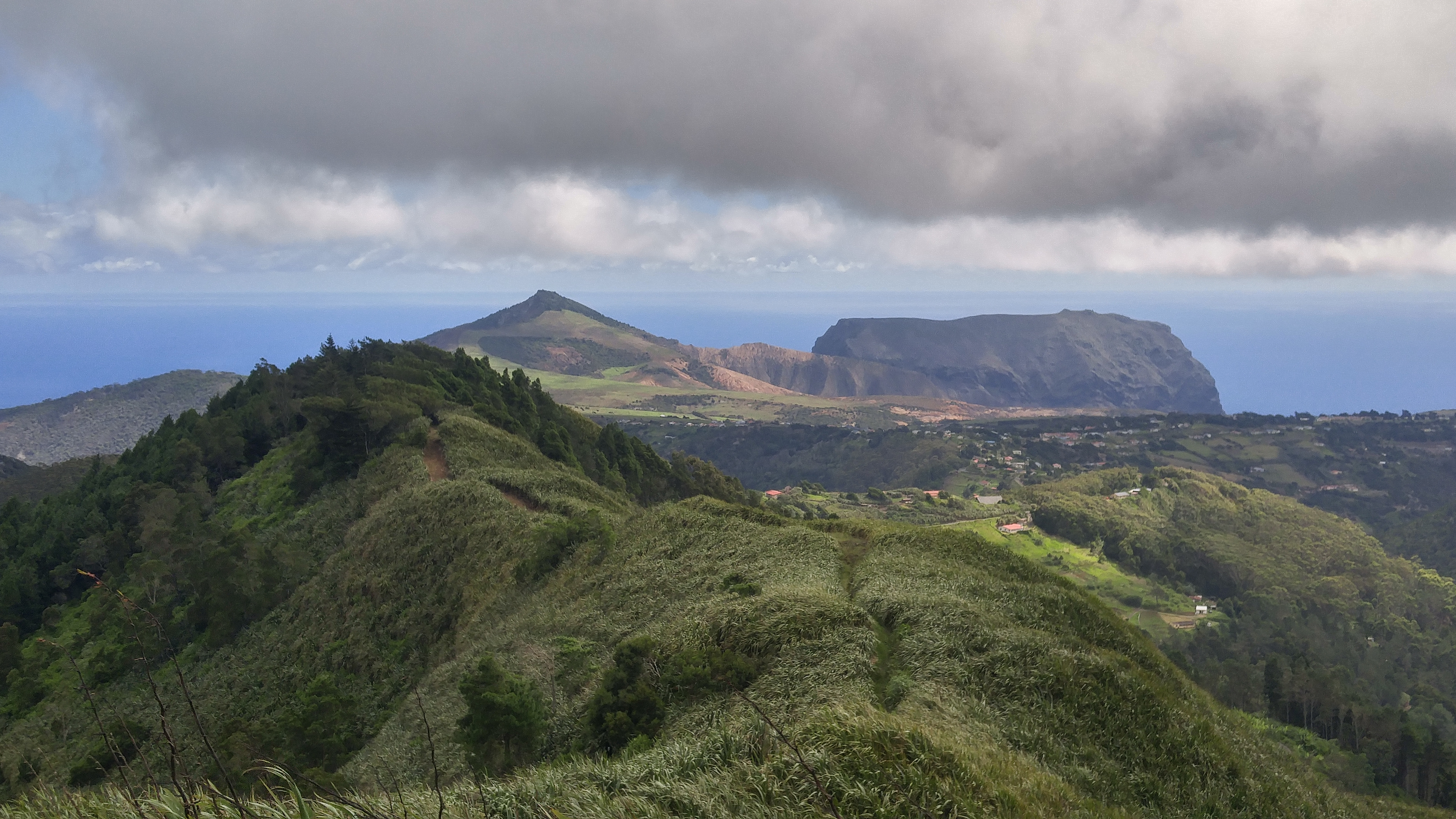
path to Halley's Observatory from below Mt. Actaeon

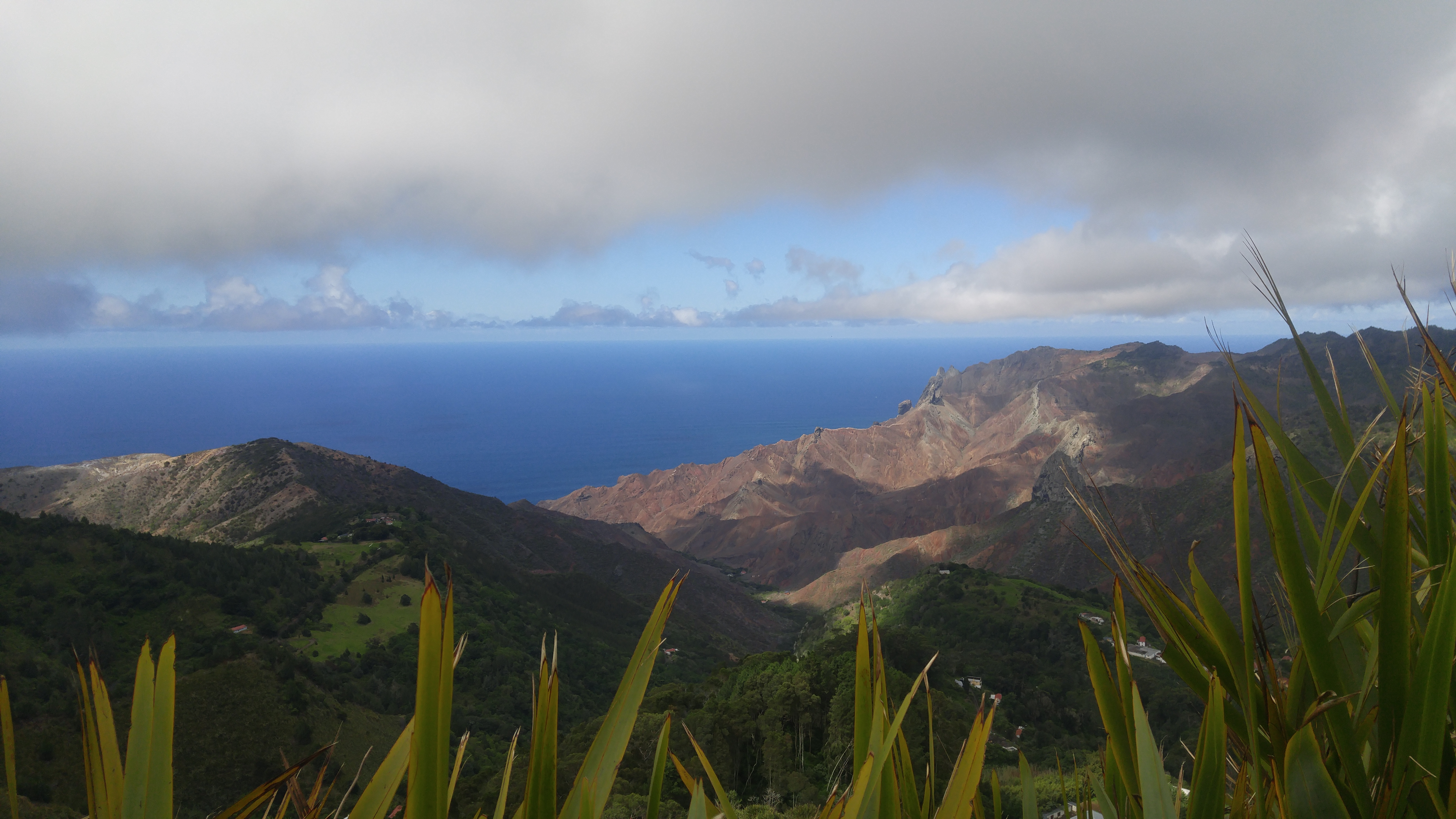
view of Sandy Bay from below Mt. Actaeon

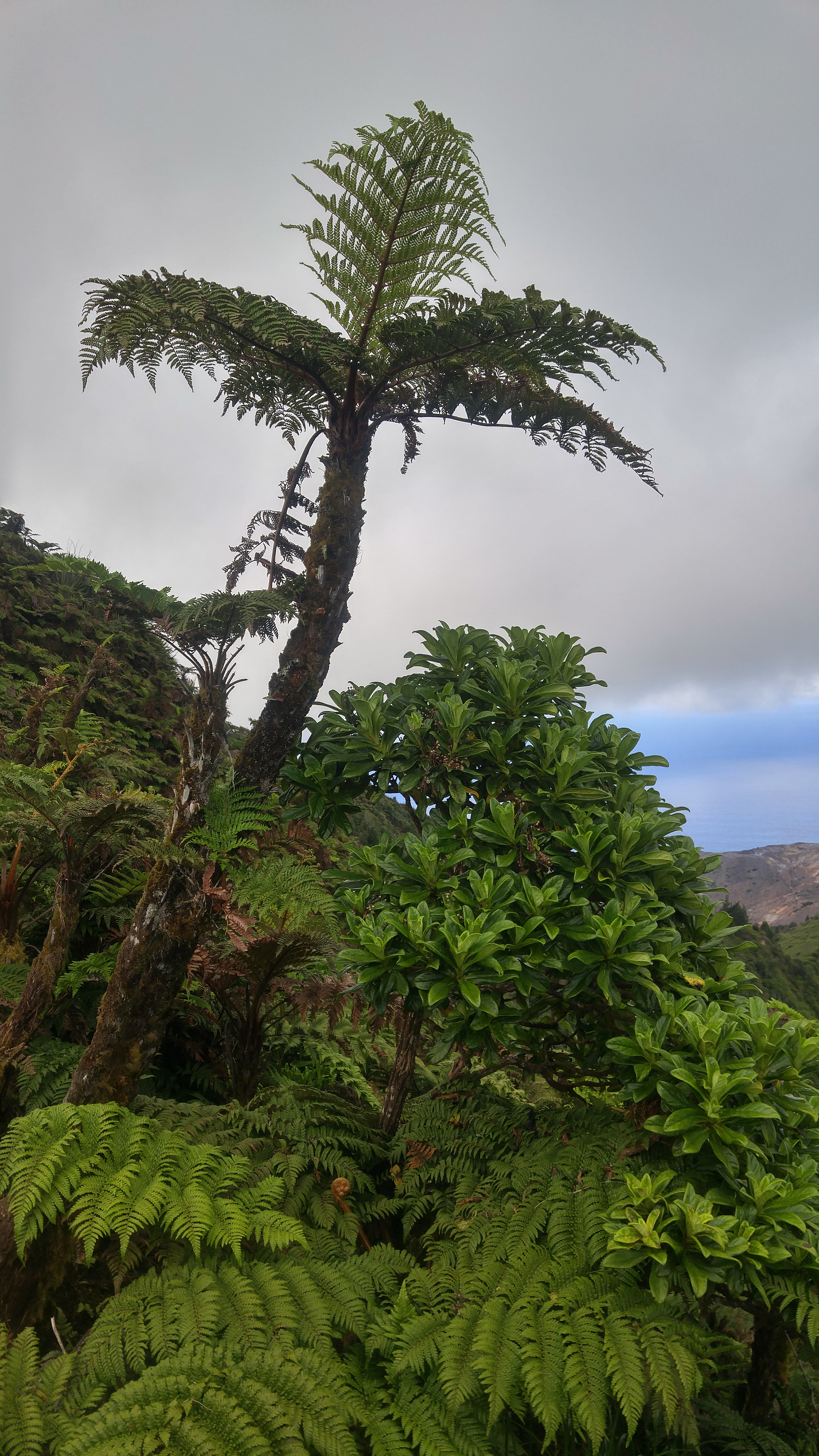
Tree fern and black cabbage tree

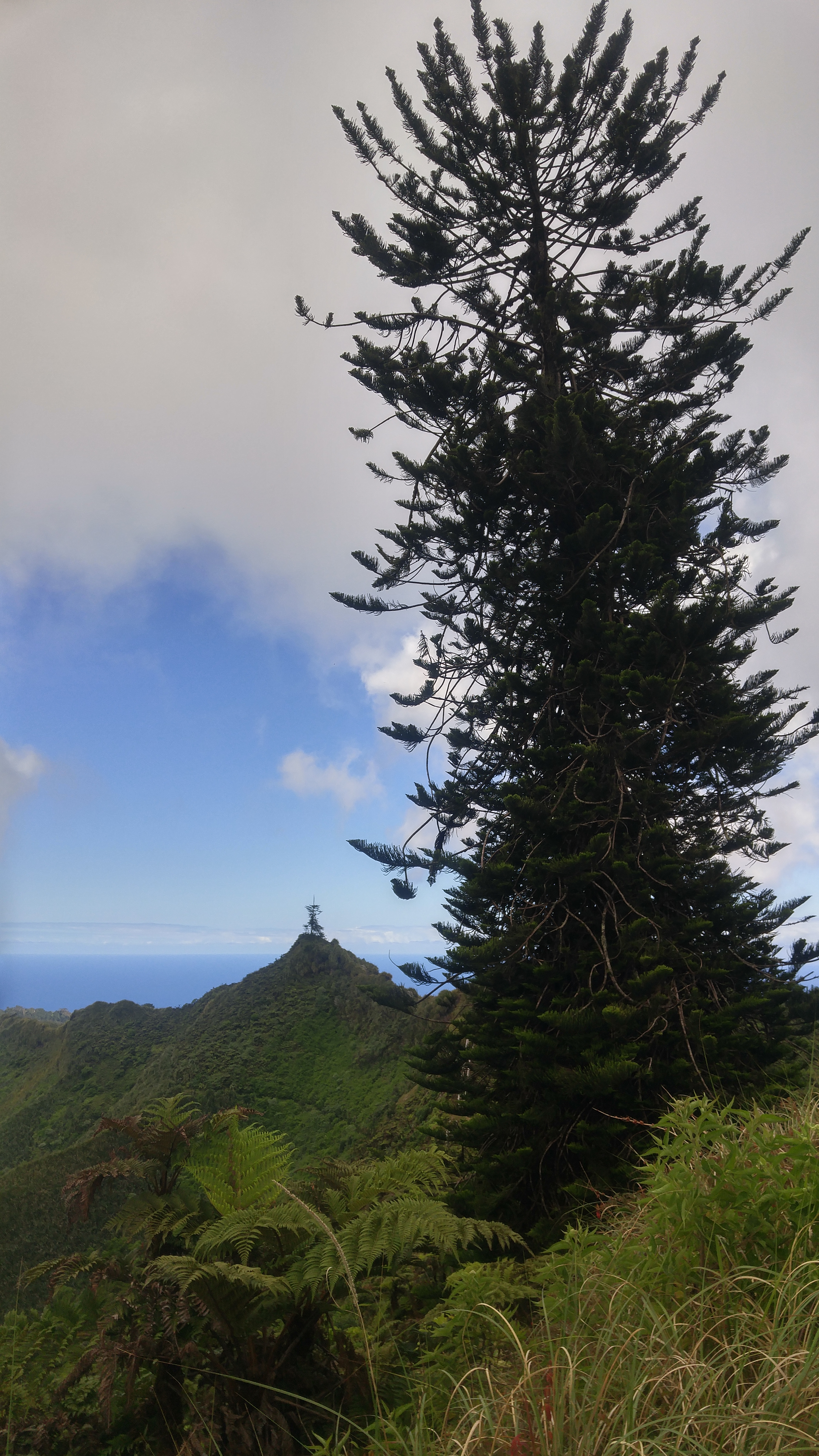
Norfolk Pines on Cuckhold's Point and Mt. Actaeon

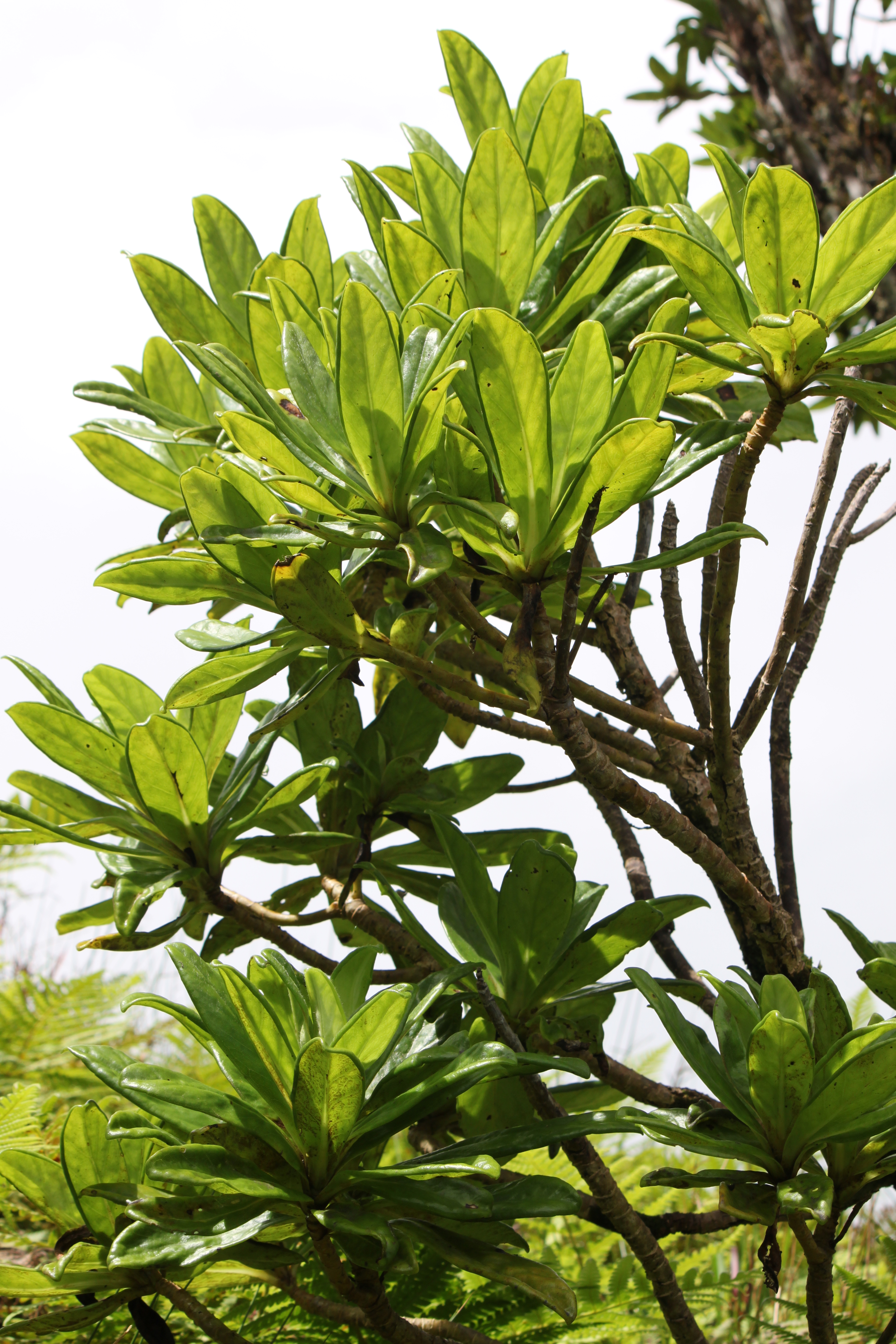
Cabbage trees

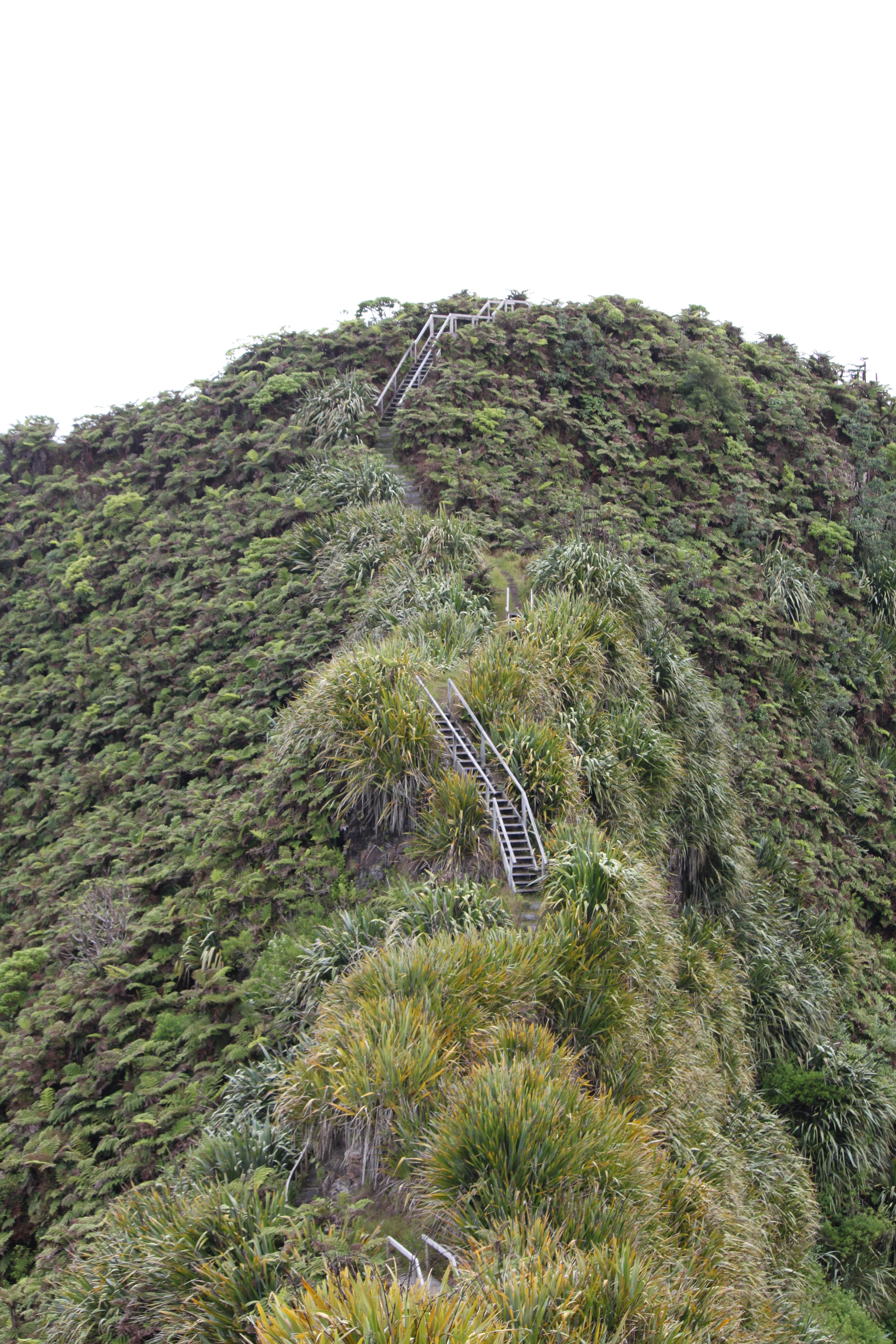
Stairs to Diana's Peak

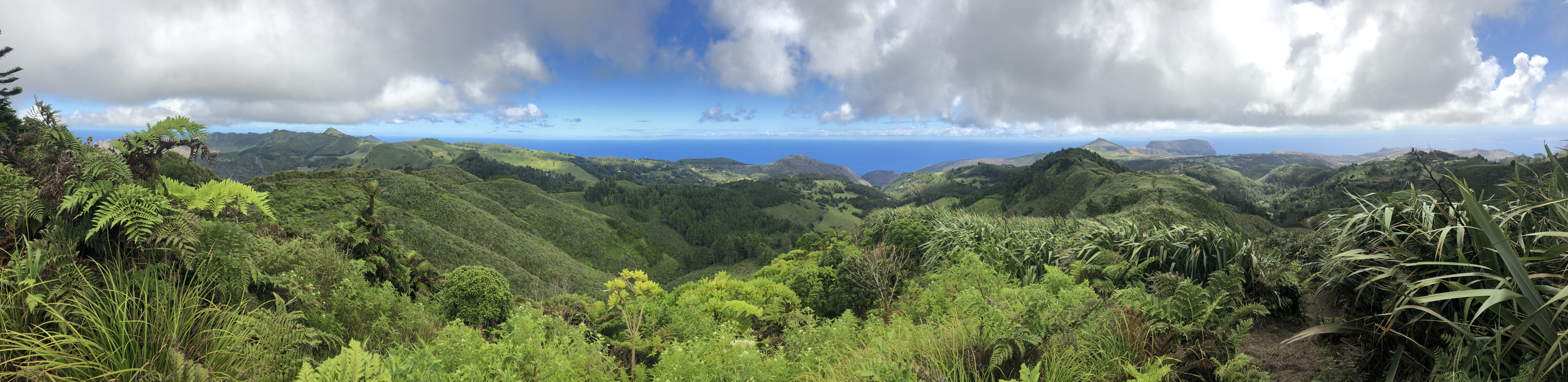
Panoramic view from Diana's Peak

== See also ==
- List of mountains and hills of Saint Helena, Ascension and Tristan da Cunha
- Geography of Saint Helena
