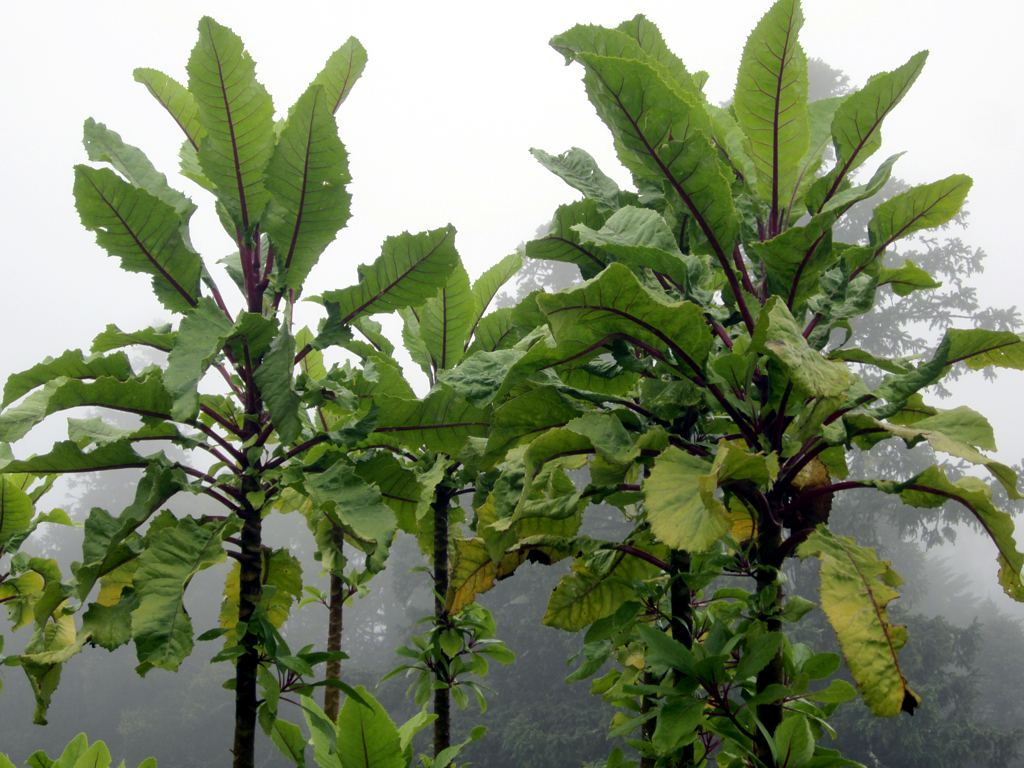

Conservation status
- Extinct in the Wild (IUCN 3.1)

Scientific classification
- Kingdom: Plantae
- Clade: Embryophytes
- Clade: Tracheophytes
- Clade: Spermatophytes
- Clade: Angiosperms
- Clade: Eudicots
- Clade: Asterids
- Order: Asterales
- Family: Asteraceae
- Subfamily: Asteroideae
- Tribe: Senecioneae
- Genus: Lachanodes
- Species: L. arborea

Binomial name
- Lachanodes arborea (Roxb.) B.Nord.

Synonyms
- Lachanodes prenanthiflora Burch. ex DC.; Mikania arborea Roxb.; Senecio prenanthiflorus (Burch. ex DC.) Hemsl.; Senecio redivivus Mabb.

= Lachanodes =

Small tree of the island of Saint Helena, known as the she cabbage tree

Lachanodes is a genus of flowering plants in the groundsel tribe of the sunflower family. It contains a single species, Lachanodes arborea, the she cabbage tree, a small tree endemic of the island of Saint Helena in the South Atlantic Ocean. It is now extinct in the wild.

== Taxonomy ==
The species was first described as Mikania arborea by William Roxburgh in 1816. In 1978 Bertil Nordenstam placed the species in genus Lachanodes. Lachanodes was described by Augustin Pyramus de Candolle in 1833. The type species was Lachanodes prenanthiflora, which is now considered a synonym of L. arborea.

== See also ==
- Flora of Saint Helena
- He cabbage tree

== Other sources ==
- Cronk, Q.C.B. (1995) The endemic Flora of St Helena. Anthony Nelson Ltd., Oswestry.
