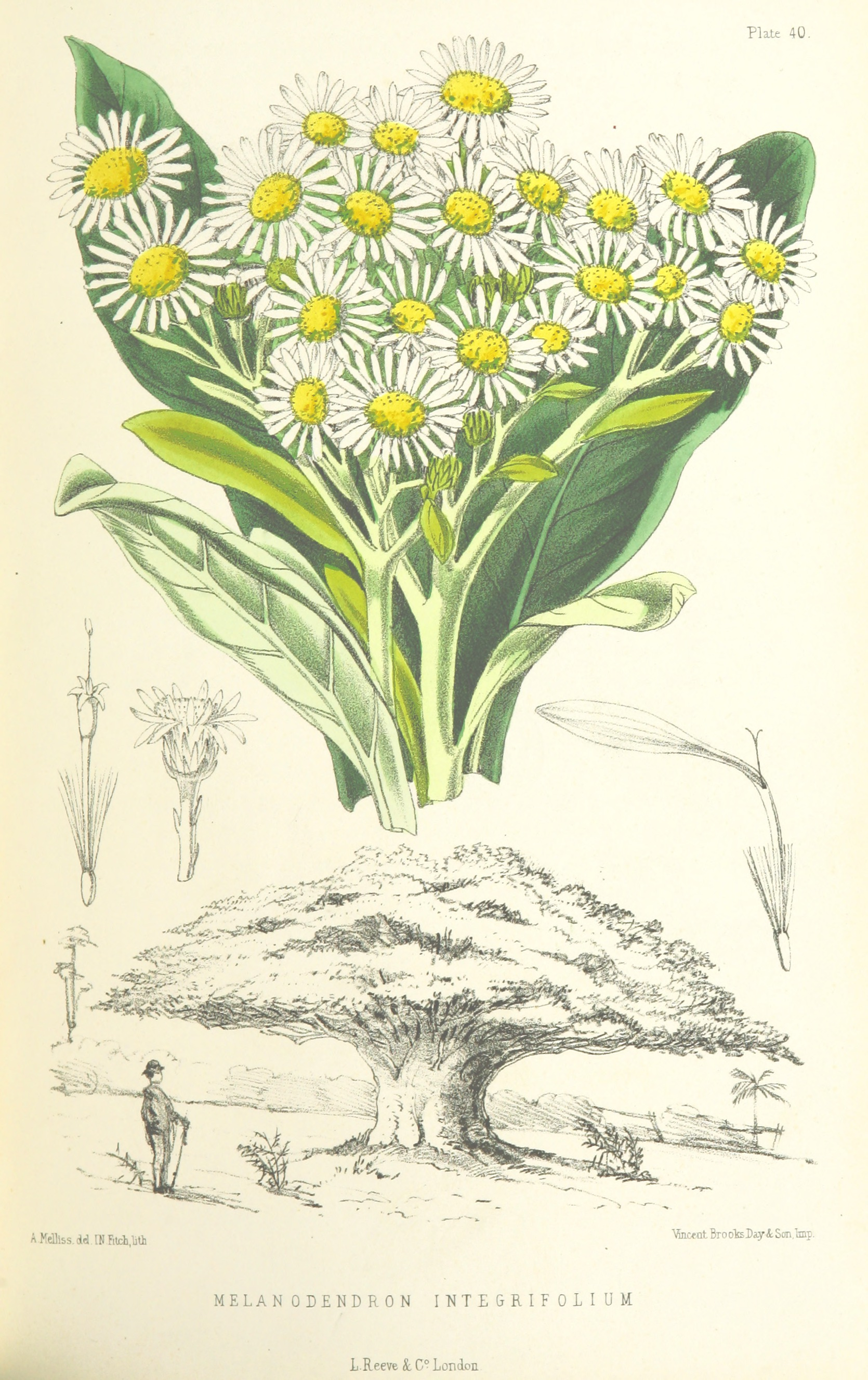

Conservation status
- Vulnerable (IUCN 3.1)

Scientific classification
- Kingdom: Plantae
- Clade: Embryophytes
- Clade: Tracheophytes
- Clade: Spermatophytes
- Clade: Angiosperms
- Clade: Eudicots
- Clade: Asterids
- Order: Asterales
- Family: Asteraceae
- Subfamily: Asteroideae
- Tribe: Astereae
- Subtribe: Homochrominae
- Genus: Melanodendron; DC.
- Species: M. integrifolium

Binomial name
- Melanodendron integrifolium (Roxb.) DC.

= Melanodendron =

Black cabbage tree

Genus of trees

Melanodendron is a genus of trees in the family Asteraceae, with only one species, Melanodendron integrifolium (black cabbage tree), native to the island of Saint Helena (South Atlantic Ocean). It is related to the Saint Helenan gumwoods (Commidendrum spp.) and is the most common of the remaining cabbage tree species of Saint Helena, although it is considered endangered due to the restricted population size.

== See also ==
- Flora of Saint Helena
