= List of Lepidoptera of Saint Helena, Ascension and Tristan da Cunha =

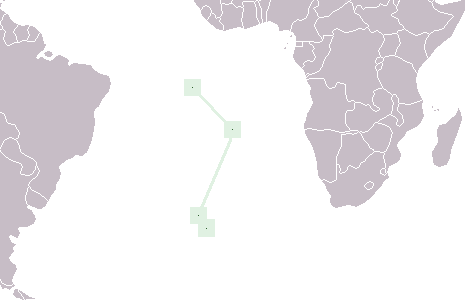
Location of Saint Helena, Ascension Island and Tristan da Cunha

The Lepidoptera of Saint Helena, Ascension Island and Tristan da Cunha consist of the butterflies and moths recorded from those places. According to a recent estimate, there are a total of about 120 Lepidoptera species present.

== Butterflies ==
=== Lycaenidae ===
- Lampides boeticus (Linnaeus, 1767)

=== Nymphalidae ===
- Danaus chrysippus (Linnaeus, 1758)
- Danaus plexippus (Linnaeus, 1758)
- Hypolimnas misippus (Linnaeus, 1764)
- Vanessa braziliensis (Moore, 1883)
- Vanessa cardui (Linnaeus, 1758)

== Moths ==
=== Choreutidae ===
- Tebenna micalis (Mann, 1857)

=== Cosmopterigidae ===
- Cosmopterix attenuatella (Walker, 1864)

=== Crambidae ===
- Cnaphalocrocis trapezalis (Guenée, 1854)
- Diaphana indica (Saunders, 1851)
- Helenoscoparia helenensis (E. Wollaston, 1879)
- Helenoscoparia lucidalis (Walker, 1875)
- Helenoscoparia nigritalis (Walker, 1875)
- Helenoscoparia scintillulalis (E. Wollaston, 1879)
- Helenoscoparia transversalis (E. Wollaston, 1879)
- Hellula undalis (Fabricius, 1781)
- Herpetogramma licarsisalis (Walker, 1859)
- Herpetogramma phaeopteralis (Guenée, 1854)
- Hodebertia testalis (Fabricius, 1794)
- Spoladea recurvalis (Fabricius, 1775)
- Udea delineatalis (Walker, 1875)
- Udea ferrugalis (Hübner, 1796)
- Udea hageni Viette, 1952
- Uresiphita polygonalis ([Denis & Schiffermüller], 1775)
- Zovax whiteheadii (E. Wollaston, 1879)

=== Elachistidae ===
- Elachista trifasciata (E. Wollaston, 1879)

=== Gelechiidae ===
- Phthorimaea operculella (Zeller, 1873)

=== Geometridae ===
- Chiasmia separata (Druce, 1883)
- Orthonama obstipata (Fabricius, 1794)
- Rhodometra sacraria (Linnaeus, 1767)
- Scopula separata (Walker, 1875)

=== Glyphipterigidae ===
- Glyphipterix semilunaris E. Wollaston, 1879

=== Gracillariidae ===
- Phyllonorycter aurifascia (Walker, 1875)

=== Hepialidae ===
- Eudalaca sanctahelena Viette, 1951

=== Lyonetiidae ===
- Leucoptera auronivea (Walker, 1875)

=== Noctuidae ===
- Acanthodelta janata (Linnaeus, 1758)
- Achaea catella Guenée, 1852
- Agrotis costalis Walker, 1857
- Agrotis ipsilon (Hufnagel, 1766)
- Agrotis pallidula Walker, 1875
- Agrotis segetum ([Denis & Schiffermüller], 1775)
- Anomis flava (Fabricius, 1775)
- Ascalapha odorata (Linnaeus, 1758)
- Caradrina atriluna Guenée, 1852
- Chrysodeixis acuta (Walker, 1858)
- Chrysodeixis dalei E. Wollaston, 1879
- Condica capensis (Guenée, 1852)
- Condica circuita (Guenée, 1852)
- Craterestra subvelata (Walker, 1875)
- Ctenoplusia limbirena (Guenée, 1852)
- Dimorphinoctua cunhaensis Viette, 1952
- Dimorphinoctua goughensis D. S. Fletcher, 1963
- Dimorphinoctua pilifera (Walker, 1857)
- Eudocima apta (Walker, [1858])
- Faronta exoul (Walker, 1856)
- Helicoverpa armigera (Hübner, 1827)
- Helicoverpa helenae Hardwick, 1965
- Hypena helenae Berio, 1972
- Hypena masurialis (Hübner, 1825)
- Hypena obacerralis Walker, [1859]
- Hypocala rostrata (Fabricius, 1794)
- Leucania ptyonophora (Hampson, 1905)
- Lycophotia porphyrea (Denis & Schiffermüller, 1775)
- Melipotis obliquivia (Hampson, 1926)
- Mocis punctularis (Hübner, 1808)
- Mythimna loreyi (Duponchel, 1827)
- Ophiusa tirhaca (Cramer, 1777)
- Pandesma robusta (Walker, 1858)
- Peridroma goughi D. S. Fletcher, 1963
- Peridroma saucia (Hübner, [1808])
- Simplicia extinctalis (Zeller, 1852)
- Spodoptera exigua (Hübner, 1808)
- Spodoptera littoralis (Boisduval, 1833)
- Trichoplusia ni (Hübner, [1803])
- Trichoplusia orichalcea (Fabricius, 1775)
- Vittaplusia vittata (Wallengren, 1856)

=== Oecophoridae ===
- Agonopterix goughi (Bradley, 1958)
- Endrosis sarcitrella (Linnaeus, 1758)
- Hofmannophila pseudospretella (Stainton, 1849)
- Schiffermuelleria pictipennis (E. Wollaston, 1879)
- Schiffermuelleria splendidula (E. Wollaston, 1879)

=== Plutellidae ===
- Plutella xylostella (Linnaeus, 1758)

=== Pterophoridae ===
- Agdistis sanctaehelenae (E. Wollaston, 1879)
- Hellinsia subnotatus (Walker, 1875)
- Megalorhipida defectalis (Walker, 1864)
- Stenodacma wahlbergi (Zeller, 1852)

=== Pyralidae ===
- Anagasta kuehniella (Zeller, 1879)
- Cactoblastis cactorum (Berg, 1885)
- Ephestia kuehniella Zeller, 1879
- Homoeosoma privata (Walker, 1875)
- Hypargyria metalliferella Ragonot, 1888
- Ocrasa nostralis (Guenée, 1854)
- Pyralis farinalis Linnaeus, 1758
- Pyralis manihotalis Guenee, 1854
- Thylacoptila paurosema Meyrick, 1885

=== Sphingidae ===
- Acherontia atropos (Linnaeus, 1758)
- Agrius convolvuli (Linnaeus, 1758)
- Agrius cingulata (Fabricius, 1775)
- Hippotion celerio (Linnaeus, 1758)

=== Tineidae ===
- Erechthias ascensionae Davis & Mendel, 2013
- Erechthias grayi Davis & Mendel, 2013
- Erechthias minuscula (Walsingham, 1897)
- Monopis crocicapitella (Clemens, 1859)
- Niditinea fuscella (Linnaeus, 1758)
- Opogona actaeon (E. Wollaston, 1879)
- Opogona anticella (Walker, 1875)
- Opogona apicalis (E. Wollaston, 1879)
- Opogona atlantica (E. Wollaston, 1879)
- Opogona binotatella (Walker, 1875)
- Opogona brunneomarmorata (E. Wollaston, 1879)
- Opogona compositarum (E. Wollaston, 1879)
- Opogona congenera (E. Wollaston, 1879)
- Opogona divisa (E. Wollaston, 1879)
- Opogona fasciculata (E. Wollaston, 1879)
- Opogona flavotincta (E. Wollaston, 1879)
- Opogona helenae (E. Wollaston, 1879)
- Opogona helenaeoides (E. Wollaston, 1879)
- Opogona irrorata (E. Wollaston, 1879)
- Opogona niveopicta (E. Wollaston, 1879)
- Opogona omoscopa (Meyrick, 1893)
- Opogona recurva (E. Wollaston, 1879)
- Opogona sacchari (Bojer, 1856)
- Opogona scalaris (E. Wollaston, 1879)
- Opogona subaeneella (Walker, 1875)
- Opogona ursella (Walker, 1875)
- Opogona vilis (E. Wollaston, 1879)
- Phereoeca allutella (Rebel, 1892)
- Tinea aureomarmorata E. Wollaston, 1879
- Tinea bicolor E. Wollaston, 1879
- Tinea dubiella Stainton, 1857
- Tinea fasciolata E. Wollaston, 1879
- Tinea flavofimbriata E. Wollaston, 1879
- Tinea minutissima E. Wollaston, 1879
- Tinea pellionella Linnaeus, 1758
- Tinea piperata E. Wollaston, 1879
- Tinea pulveripennis E. Wollaston, 1879
- Tinea pulverulenta E. Wollaston, 1879
- Tinea subalbidella Stainton, 1867

=== Tortricidae ===
- Crocidosema plebejana Zeller, 1847
- Lozotaenia capensana (Walker, 1863)
- Thaumatotibia leucotreta (Meyrick, 1913)

=== Uraniidae ===
- Chrysiridia prometheus (Drapiez, 1819)

== Sources ==
- Robinson, Gaden S. & Kirke, Charles M.StG. (2007). "Lepidoptera of Ascension Island—a review". Journal of Natural History. 24 (1): 119–135. doi:10.1080/00222939000770081.
- Holdgate, M. W. (October 7, 1965). "The Fauna of the Tristan Da Cunha Islands". Philosophical Transactions of the Royal Society of London. Series B, Biological Sciences. 249 (759): 361–402. doi:10.1098/rstb.1965.0015.
- De Prins, J. & De Prins, W. (2017). "Afromoths, online database of Afrotropical moth species (Lepidoptera)". Afromoths.
