= 1874 in rail transport =

This article lists events related to rail transport that occurred in 1874.

== Events ==
=== January events ===
- January 13 – The Bergen city council in Norway begins issuing stock for the Voss Line, with 400,000 Norwegian speciedaler (NOK 1.6 million) issued.
- January 27 – The Bo'ness Junction rail crash in Falkirk, Scotland kills 16 people.

=== May events ===
- May 1 – Construction begins on the Seattle and Walla Walla Railroad, the first railroad to be built in Seattle, Washington, United States.
- May 5 – The Boston, Revere Beach and Lynn Railroad is chartered in Massachusetts.
- May 18 – Construction begins on the Denver, South Park and Pacific Railroad.

=== June events ===
- June 20 – The Denver, South Park and Pacific Railroad, building from Denver, reaches Morrison, Colorado.
- June 25 – The Budapest Cog-wheel Railway opens for regular service.

=== July events ===
- July – Hugh J. Jewett succeeds Peter H. Watson as president of the Erie Railroad.
- July 3 – The first revenue trains on the Denver, South Park and Pacific Railroad operate between Denver and Morrison, Colorado.
- July 4 – Official opening of Eads Bridge (combined road and rail steel arch) over the Mississippi River at St. Louis, Missouri, designed by James B. Eads. It is the longest arch bridge in the world at this time, with an overall length of 6,442 feet (1,964 m); the first use of true steel as a primary structural material in a major bridge project; the first built using cantilever support methods exclusively; and the first major project to make use of pneumatic caissons.
- July 16 – The West Somerset Railway is extended to Minehead by the Minehead Railway.
- July 28 – The Sutherland and Caithness Railway is opened through to Wick and Thurso, completing the Highland Railway system to the far north of Scotland.

=== September events ===
- September 10 – Thorpe rail accident near Norwich (Norfolk) in England: 25 people are killed when a communication error causes a mail train and an express passenger train to meet in a head-on collision on a single-line section. The accident leads directly to the adoption of automatic control systems to manage traffic on single-track railways.
- September 14 – A franchise for the extension of the Spring and Sixth Street Railroad to the Southern Pacific Railroad's Old River Station, in Los Angeles, California, is approved.
- September 23 – East Broad Top narrow gauge railroad in Pennsylvania operates its first revenue trains.

=== October events ===
- October 23 – The first trains operate on the Monterey and Salinas Valley Railroad, making it the first narrow gauge railroad to operate in California.
- October 26 – Grand Trunk Railway converts all 546 miles (879 km) of its track east of Montreal to Portland, Maine from 5 ft 6 in (1676 mm) Portland gauge to 4 ft 8 1/2 in (1,435 mm) standard gauge.

=== November events ===
- November 7 – The Miami Valley Narrow Gauge Railway, the predecessor of the Miami Valley Railway, is incorporated.
- November 8 – Tracks of the Southern Pacific Railroad reach Bakersfield, California; work begins on the route that would eventually become the Tehachapi Loop.

=== Unknown date events ===
- The Milwaukee and Mississippi Railroad, an early predecessor of the Milwaukee Road, changes its official name to Chicago, Milwaukee, and St. Paul.
- The Wm. Mason, an 0-6-6 Mason Bogie by William Mason (locomotive builder), is the first locomotive with Walschaerts valve gear built in the United States.
- Dr. Livingston Stone of the U.S. Fish Commission (which later becomes the United States Fish and Wildlife Service) "chaperones" a shipment of 35,000 shad fry to stock the Sacramento River in California in the first such delivery by rail aboard a fish car.

== Deaths ==
=== March deaths ===
- March 27 – Joseph Harrison, Jr., partner in the American steam locomotive manufacturing firm of Eastwick and Harrison (b. 1810).

=== May deaths ===
- May 27 – John Edgar Thomson, president of the Pennsylvania Railroad 1852–1874 (b. 1808).

=== June deaths ===
- June 20 – John Ruggles, who was awarded U.S. patent 1 for improved driving wheels (b. 1789).
