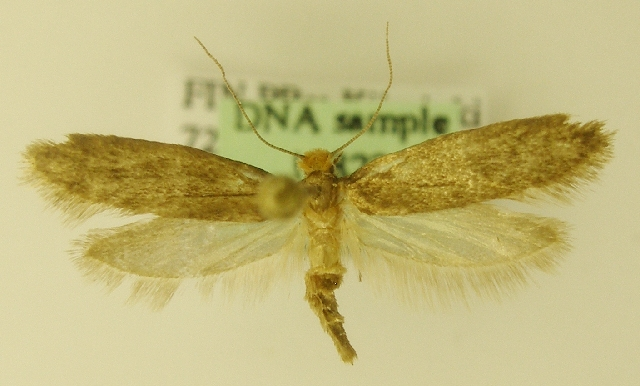

Scientific classification
- Kingdom: Animalia
- Phylum: Arthropoda
- Class: Insecta
- Order: Lepidoptera
- Family: Tineidae
- Genus: Tinea
- Species: T. svenssoni

Binomial name
- Tinea svenssoni Opheim, 1965

Synonyms
- Acedes svenssoni Hübner, 1825; Autoses svenssoni Hübner, 1825; Dystinea svenssoni Börner, 1925; Tineopis svenssoni Zagulajev, 1960

= Tinea svenssoni =

Species of moth

Tinea svenssoni is a moth of the family Tineidae. It is found in northern Europe (Norway, Sweden, Finland, the Baltic region), Russia, as well as North America where has been recorded from Québec.

The wingspan is 13–18 millimetres (0.51–0.71 in). Difficult to distinguish from Tinea pellionella, Tinea columbariella and Tinea dubiella but the genitalia are diagnostic.

The larvae live in bird nests, typically in the nests of cavity-nesting species, such as tits and owls.
