= Zovax vangoghi =

Scientific classification
- Kingdom: Animalia
- Phylum: Arthropoda
- Clade: Pancrustacea
- Class: Insecta
- Order: Lepidoptera
- Family: Crambidae
- Subfamily: Crambinae
- Tribe: Ancylolomiini
- Genus: Zovax
- Species: Z. vangoghi

Binomial name
- Zovax vangoghi Błeszyński, 1965

Species of moth

Zovax vangoghi is a moth in the family Crambidae. It was described by Stanisław Błeszyński in 1965. It is found in Sudan.

It is named after Dutch painter Vincent van Gogh.
