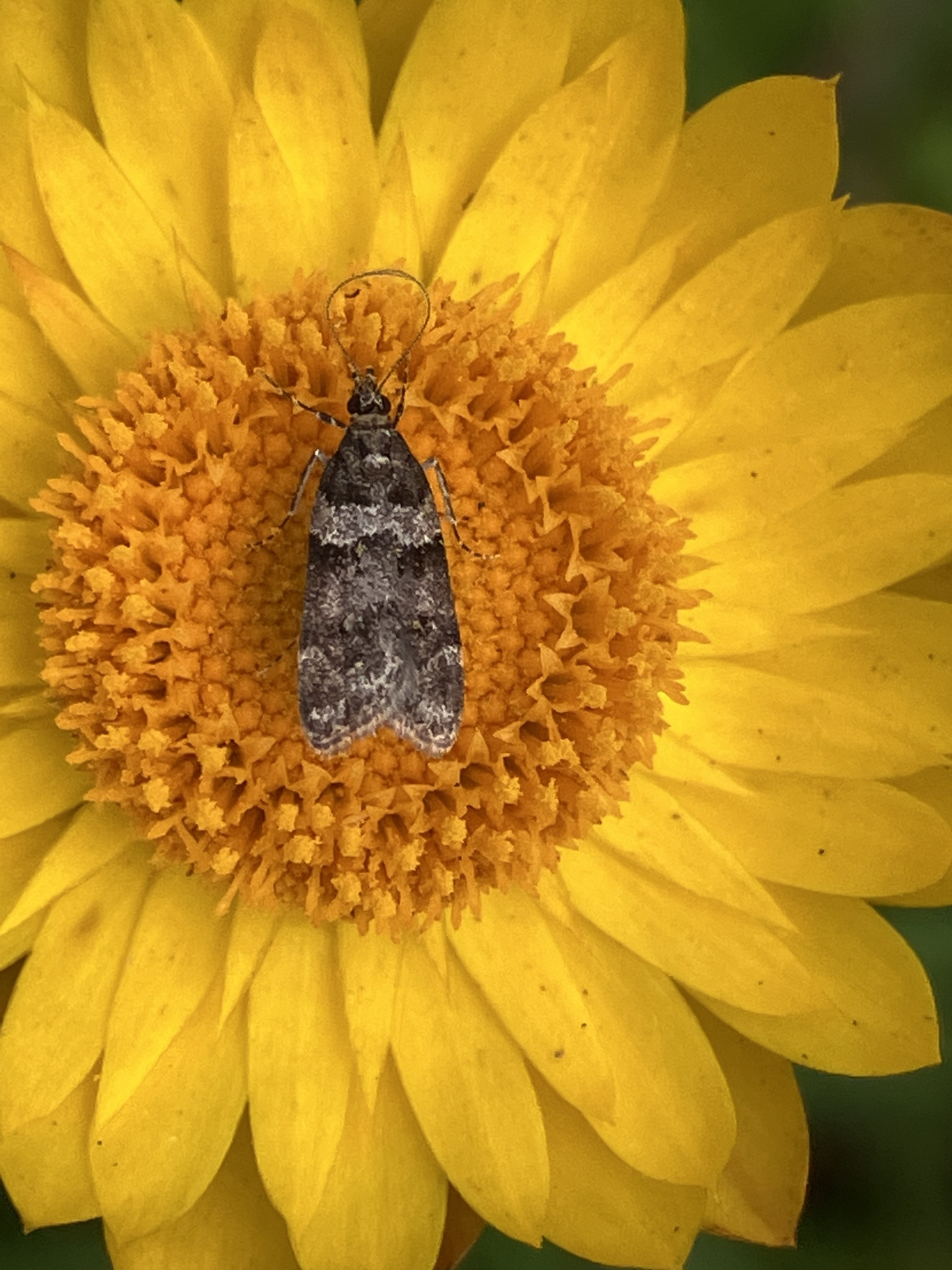

Scientific classification
- Kingdom: Animalia
- Phylum: Arthropoda
- Class: Insecta
- Order: Lepidoptera
- Family: Crambidae
- Genus: Helenoscoparia
- Species: H. nigritalis

Binomial name
- Helenoscoparia nigritalis (Walker in Melliss, 1875)

Synonyms
- Scoparia nigritalis Walker in Melliss, 1875; Scoparia similis E. Wollaston, 1879

= Helenoscoparia nigritalis =

Species of moth

Helenoscoparia nigritalis is a moth in the family Crambidae. It was described by Francis Walker in 1875. It is found on Saint Helena.
