= Livingston Stone =

American fish farmer

Livingston Stone (October 21, 1836 - December 24, 1912) was a prominent American 19th century fish culturist. He is credited with developing the first fish farm in New England. Stone was appointed to build a salmon hatchery on the west coast of the United States under the newly developed U.S. Fisheries Commission. With his crew, Stone chose to build the hatchery on the McCloud River, near Redding, California. There, he spawned fish and shipped the eggs world-wide.

In 1882, Stone constructed another hatchery on the McCloud River to produce rainbow trout, which were also shipped broadly. When this hatchery was shut down after proficient stocks of rainbows had been established at other federal fish hatcheries, Stone conducted hatchery work in Oregon and Alaska. On a trip to Alaska, Stone was inspired to establish a National Salmon Park to protect overfished species.

Throughout his career, Stone authored many publications, including Trout Culture, the first manual on trout rearing. Stone developed fish culturing and transportation techniques and was a founding member of the American Fisheries Society. Populations of fishes introduced by Stone currently persist, and descendants of the McCloud rainbow trout are still stocked in rivers today.

== Early life ==
Livingston Stone was born October 21, 1836, in Cambridge, Massachusetts. After attending Cambridge public schools throughout his childhood, Stone attended Harvard University and graduated with honors in 1857. Stone continued his education at the Meadville Theological School in Pennsylvania, where he graduated in 1864. That year, Stone became a minister at a Unitarian church in Charleston, New Hampshire. While fulfilling his duties as a minister, Stone began to experiment with rearing eastern brook trout in the Cold Springs Trout Ponds near the church. Stone decided to resign as a minister and dedicate all of his time to trout rearing. Stone had ongoing health issues, which may have contributed to his career change. At the time, a common prescription for illness was spending time in the fresh air - something that trout culture allowed for.

== Career ==
=== Cold Springs Trout Ponds and Atlantic Salmon Rearing ===
Stone's Cold Springs Trout Ponds became the first recorded fish farm in New England. The ponds were commercial; Stone made profits selling eastern brook trout (Salvelinus fontinalis) to individuals wishing to stock private waters. Stone's passion for fish culture lead him to become an editor for a column in the New York newspaper detailing fish culture practices.

In 1868, Stone was involved in attempts at Atlantic salmon (Salmo salar) propagation in New Brunswick, New Jersey. He was recruited by the State commissions of New Hampshire and Massachusetts to breed salmon in the U.S. in response for expensive Canadian prices. Eggs from the hatchery on the Miramichi River were brought back to the Cold Springs Trout Ponds for rearing, however, the Atlantic salmon spawning project was shut down after two years.

=== Founding member of the American Fisheries Society ===
As fish culture grew as a career in North America, culturists identified a need for an organization to discuss, explore, and standardize prices and methods. In 1870, the first American Fish Culturists Association was formed, becoming official in February 1871, with William Clift serving as the first president and Livingston Stone as the first secretary. Stone made major contributions to drafting the constitution. Two years later in 1872, the American Fish Culturists Association held their first meeting, where fish culturists shared projects and findings. At the time, members joined through invitation only, and the majority of members were scientists from the east coast, creating an emphasis on conservation of specific species native to the eastern United States. Today the organization is known as the American Fisheries Society, which now has open membership and strong and widespread prevalence in the fisheries and academic world.

=== Baird Hatchery on the McCloud River ===
In the late 1870s and early 1880s, Stone and other fish culturists developed a relationship with Robert B. Roosevelt, an avid angler, New York congressman, head of the New York Fish Commission, and Uncle to Theodore Roosevelt. Robert Roosevelt, with the support of Stone and some other fish culturists, introduced a bill into congress that would supply the U.S. Fisheries Commission with funding to establish hatcheries nation-wide. Roosevelt's bill was blocked, but in June 1872, a different bill allocating $15,000 to the U.S. Fisheries Commission was passed.

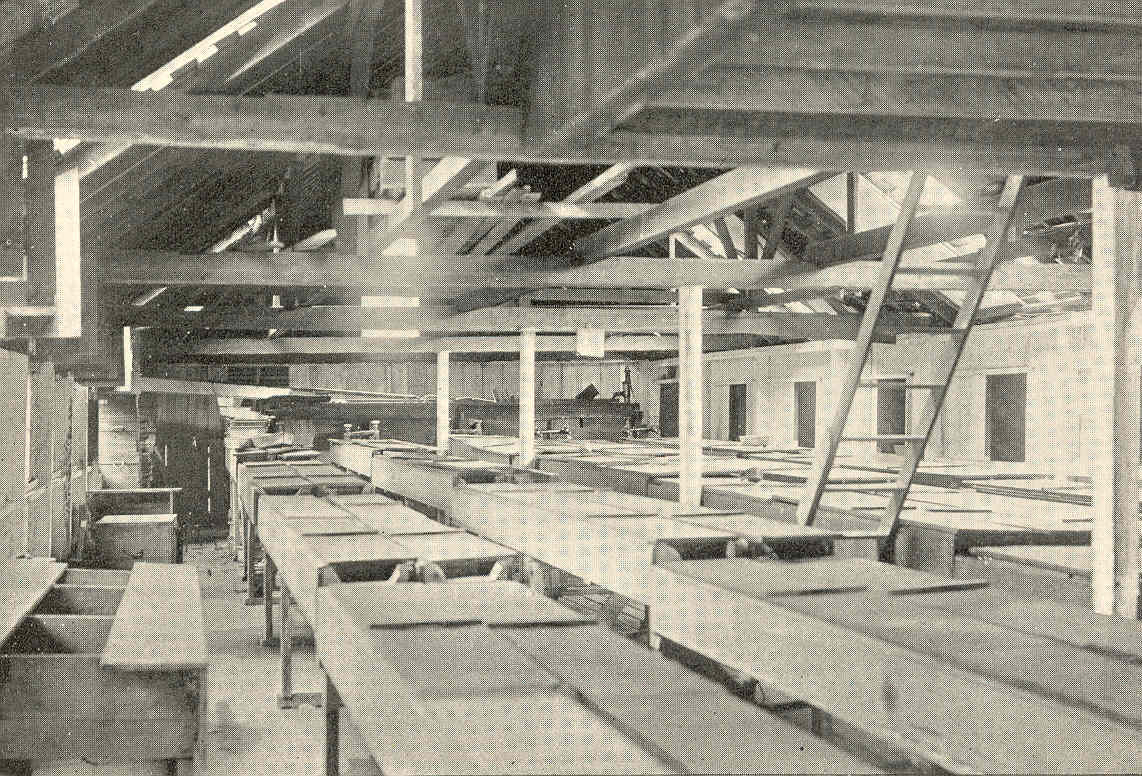
Photograph of the inside of the Baird Hatchery on the McCloud River taken by Stone in 1896.

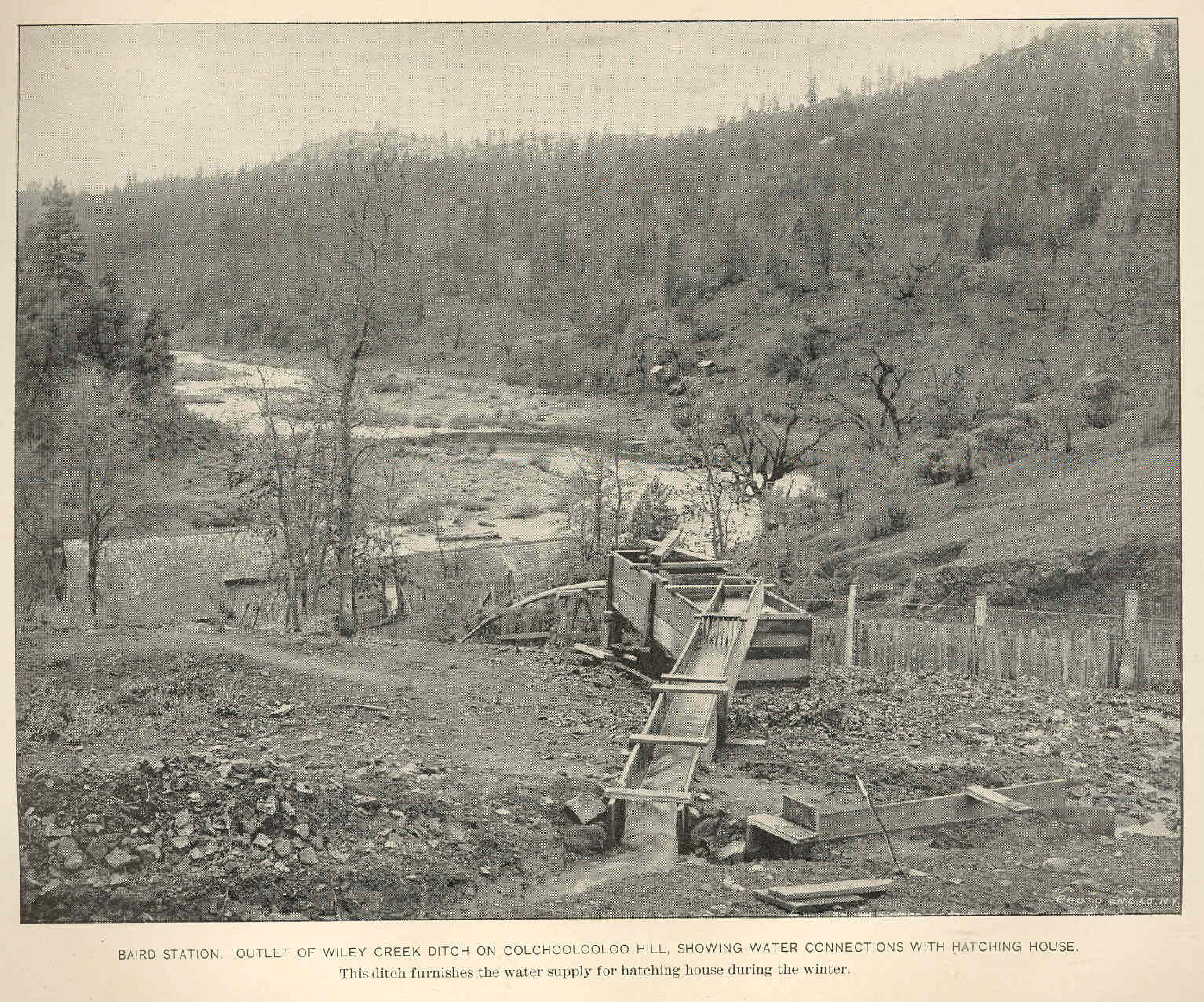
Photograph of waterways connecting the McCloud River to the Baird hatchery house taken by Stone in 1896.

Stone, appointed by the U.S. Fisheries Commissioner Spencer Fullerton Baird, was allocated $5,000 of this $15,000 to establish a hatchery on the Pacific coast. The goals of this hatchery were to help sustain the declining Atlantic salmon fisheries on the east coast and to enhance food fisheries. In fall 1872, Stone arrived with a small crew in San Francisco, where they traveled north along the McCloud River until they found the native Wintu people catching Chinook salmon (Oncorhynchus tshawytscha), roughly 50 miles north of Red Bluff. Stone and his men immediately built a hatchery, which they named the Baird Hatchery, and begun operations. Despite efforts, the crew had a low success year due to their late arrival into the spawning season.

Stone's second year at the Baird hatchery yielded roughly 1.5 million eggs. These eggs were shipped all over the United States, with some being shipped internationally to Japan and New Zealand. Over the next 6 years, Chinook eggs had been distributed to 29 states and multiple countries, however, no runs were established. Between two and 14 million eggs were harvested each year from 1874 and 1883. With construction of a nearby railroad in the 1880s, the Chinook salmon run on the McCloud began to decline. In 1883, only one million eggs were collected from the returning brood stock, so operations at the McCloud hatchery were suspended until 1887. Operations at the hatchery resumed in 1888, however Stone had been assigned by the new U.S. Fisheries Commissioner, Marshall MacDonald, to work full time at the Clackamas Hatchery in Oregon, which he had established in 1877.

After spending time in Oregon and Alaska, Stone returned to work at the Baird Hatchery from 1892 to 1897, where his mission was to supplement the declining stocks of the Chinook in the McCloud River rather than to distribute eggs to establish new populations.

=== Crook's Creek Trout Ponds (McCloud River Trout Hatchery) ===
Stone expanded his efforts to spawning and transporting rainbow trout (Oncorhynchus mykiss) in 1878, and established a trout hatchery on the McCloud River about 15 miles north of the Baird hatchery on Crook's Creek tributary.

Stone's new trout station was highly successful, resulting in over 250,000 eggs the first year of operation. Like the McCloud River salmon eggs, the trout eggs were shipped all over the United States and stocked in multiple waters. Stone's rainbow trout became well established in many areas, and hatcheries nationwide began propagating their own stocks with origins of the McCloud River. In 1888, U.S. Fisheries Commissioner Marshall MacDonald deemed there to be enough hatcheries producing rainbow trout throughout the nation and closed down the Crook's Creek Trout Ponds. Although the hatchery has not been operational since then, many rainbow trout in United States and the worlds' waters are descendants of the McCloud River rainbow trout spawned by Stone and his crew.

=== Relationship with the Wintu Tribe ===
Stone and his men constructed the Baird Hatchery roughly one mile above the Wintu Tribe's residence on the McCloud River. In Stone's Report of operations in California in 1873, published in the Report of the Commissioner for 1873-4 and 1874–5, he recounts the crew's first interactions with the Wintu tribe upon their arrival the previous year:

"They assembled in force, with their bows and arrows, on the opposite bank of the river, and spent the whole day in resentful demonstrations, or, as Mr. Woodbury expressed it, in trying to drive us off. Had they thought they could succeed in driving us off with impunity to themselves, they undoubtedly would have done so, and have hesitated at nothing to accomplish their object; but the terrible punishments which they have suffered from the hands of the whites for past misdeeds are too vivid in their memories to allow them to attempt any open or punishable violence."

To attempt to forge a more friendly relationship with the Wintu people, Stone returned all the spawned salmon carcasses to the tribe, as he understood salmon were a valued food source and of cultural importance to them. He also reported supplying them with occasional food and medicine in his 1873 report back to Baird.

Stone employed members of the Wintu tribe to work at the hatchery from the hatchery's opening until 1883, when the hatchery was temporarily out of service. When Stone returned to the Baird Hatchery in 1892, college students made up the majority of the workforce.

Stone expressed admiration and graciousness towards the Wintu people in many of his reports to the U.S. Fisheries Commissioner throughout his time in California. In his 1872 report to the U.S. Fisheries Commissioner, Stone included a list of Wintu vocabulary. In another report, published in the Report of the Commissioner of Fish and Fisheries, also written in 1872, Stone issued powerful statements about the land rights of the Wintu and their role in the McCloud salmon fishery:

"It would be an inhuman outrage to drive the superior and inoffensive race from the river, and I believe that policy to use them is to let them be where they are, and if necessary, to protect them from the white men". "The presence of the Indians, therefore, as far as it implies the absence of the whites, is the great protection of the supply of the Sacramento salmon".

Despite generally good relations with and positive opinions of the tribe, Stone described the Wintu people as "poor, ignorant, indignant savages" and "indolent" in reports back to Baird.

=== Species introductions ===
Between the first and second year's operations at the Baird Hatchery (1872–1873), Stone was tasked with bringing a variety of eastern fishes to California waters. Stone's first experience with species introduction was unsuccessful, he stocked a shipment of Whitefish (Coregoninae sp.) in California waters, but the species did not persist. Baird ordered Stone back east to develop a special train cart for transporting fishes, which was then filled with a variety of species to be shipped to California. On the way, a bridge over the Elkhorn River in Nevada collapsed, and the shipment was lost, though Stone and his crew escaped with his life. Successful introductions of American shad, catfish, black bass, and striped bass populations have been attributed to Stone. Stone also attempted introductions of Atlantic salmon, whitefish, glass-eyed perch, silver eel, and rock bass, but these populations were not established.

=== Clackamas Hatchery ===
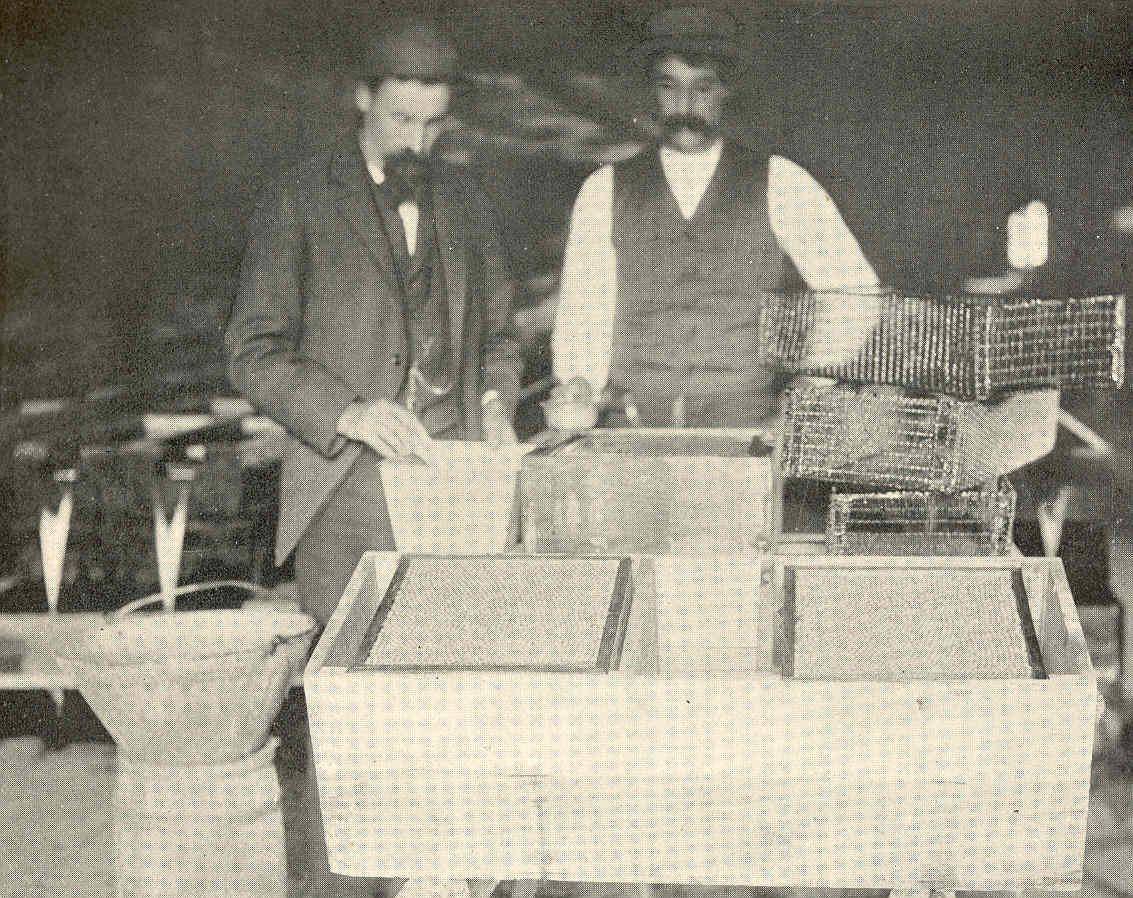
Hatchery personnel packaging trout eggs at the Clackamas hatchery in Oregon, where Stone began working in 1888.

Stone established the Clackamas hatchery in 1875 while exploring the cause of a declining run of salmon in the Columbia River. Stone worked part time at the Clackamas hatchery to prepare for effective operations until 1877. During this time, he faced challenges of disputes over fishing rights with an individual named Leschinsky, who was eventually detained for disruption of hatchery operations and illegal fishing.

Upon the temporary shut down of the Baird hatchery operations in 1883, Stone was transferred to the Clackamas hatchery in Oregon. There Stone continued regular spawning operations while transferring ownership of the hatchery to the federal government. Stone worked there until his transfer back to the Baird Hatchery in 1892. The Clackamas hatchery is still open today and rears spring Chinook salmon, winter steelhead (anadromous Oncorhynchus mykiss) and coho salmon.

=== Cape Vincent Hatchery ===
Stone's final station was the Cape Vincent Hatchery in New York state, where he worked from 1897 until his retirement in 1906 at age 70. During his time at this hatchery, Stone reared trout, salmon, walleye, whitefish and sturgeon. Stone published papers on sturgeon spawning during his time at Cape Vincent: "Sturgeon Hatching in the Lake Champlain Basin" and "The Spawning Habits of the Lake Sturgeon".

Today the Cape Vincent Hatchery is known as the Cape Vincent Fisheries Station and has been transformed into an aquarium, education center, and offices for the New York Department of Environmental Conservation's Lake Ontario Fisheries Unit.

== Additional fisheries contributions ==
Stone authored "Domesticated Trout: How to Breed and Grow Them" in 1872, the first guide to rearing trout. Stone's work went on to become the standard manual for fish culture at the time and is still used today.

In 1879 at the Baird Hatchery, Stone was the first to recommend and request a trained biologist be added to hatchery personnel.

Stone was credited with being the first to transport live fish across the country in 1873. Stone loaded shad into milk cartons and changed the water every two hours to ensure survival. His previous attempts at transporting saltwater species and shad were unsuccessful. After Stone's successful journey and planting of the shad, transportation of fish by rail became common and easier with new inventions.

One of Stone's most notable achievements was advocating for and facilitating the establishment of a national salmon park in Afognak Island, Alaska. After witnessing canneries located on the island take abundant amounts of the salmon, leaving almost none for the native Aleut tribe, Stone wrote "A National Salmon Park", highlighting the importance of conservation. Stone's paper was so influential that President William Harrison dedicated a reserve for salmon around the island later in 1892. Although the reserve was successful in conserving salmon and re-establishing the runs, the native people were prohibited from fishing independently until a hatchery was built on the reserve in 1912. Today the salmon reserve around Afognak Island is part of Afognak Island State Park, and the fishery is managed by Alaska Department of Fish and Game. Through advocating for salmon protection, Stone inspired other conservation movements and set the groundwork for implementations of protected marine and inland areas.

During his career, Stone also identified 23 fish diseases and developed the first fish salt treatment for diseased fishes.

== Recognitions and honors ==
In 1883, Stone was recognized in the annual report for the Smithsonian Institution for contributing fish, bird, and specimens, as well as models of fish culture apparatuses. That same year, Stone received a diploma signifying honor at the International Fisheries Exhibition, signed by the Prince of Wales. Stone's work was recognized in articles in the Overland Monthly magazine, and the Sacramento Record Union newspapers in 1875, and 1880, respectively. In 1874, his hatchery was mentioned briefly in a San Francisco Bulletin article by Sierra Club founder John Muir, who had previously visited the Baird hatchery earlier that year. In 1880, Stone attended the World's Fair in Berlin Germany, as part of the United States exhibit of fishes and fish culture. Stone was a featured speaker at multiple conventions and conferences, notably he presented a paper on fish culture to the National Fisheries Congress in 1898.

Stone was also recommended for the position of U.S. Fisheries Commissioner in 1887, after Baird's death. Stone declined the position though, as he wished to continue a life primarily outdoors. In 1872, Stone was named the U.S. Deputy Fish Commissioner, and in 1890, he was deemed America's Senior Fish Culturist.

Aside from Stone's many achievements in fisheries, he was also a recognized chess player. In 1990, Stone won a chess match against Frank J. Marshall in a tournament. Marshall later went on to become the U.S. Chess Champion for 27 years.

== Death and legacy ==
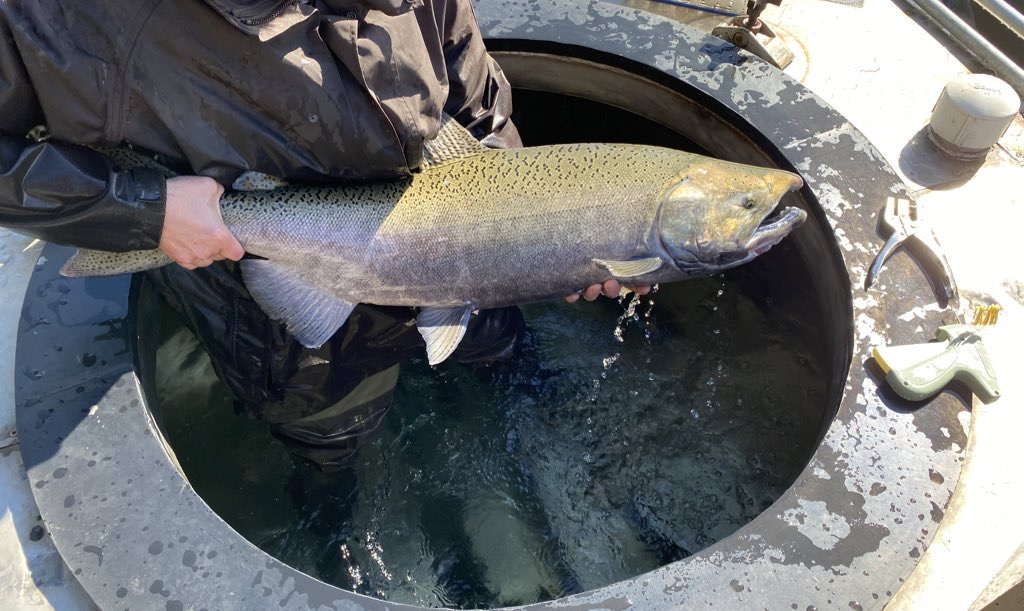
Personnel at the Livingston Stone Fish Hatchery on the Sacramento River spawn winter run Chinook salmon.

Stone died on December 24, 1912, in Pittsburgh. His body was transported back to Cambridge, Massachusetts, where he was buried at the Mt. Auburn Cemetery.

In 1989, the American Fisheries Society indoctrinated Livingston Stone into the National Fish Culture Hall of Fame (Spearfish, South Dakota). To further commemorate Stone's contributions, a federal fish hatchery near Redding, CA, was renamed the Livingston Stone National Fish Hatchery.

The impacts of Stone's work can still be seen in fisheries and fish culture throughout the world; supplementing salmon runs through hatchery rearing and egg distribution are common practices. Shad populations introduced by Stone persist in California, and rainbow trout have become the most commonly stocked game fish throughout the United States.
