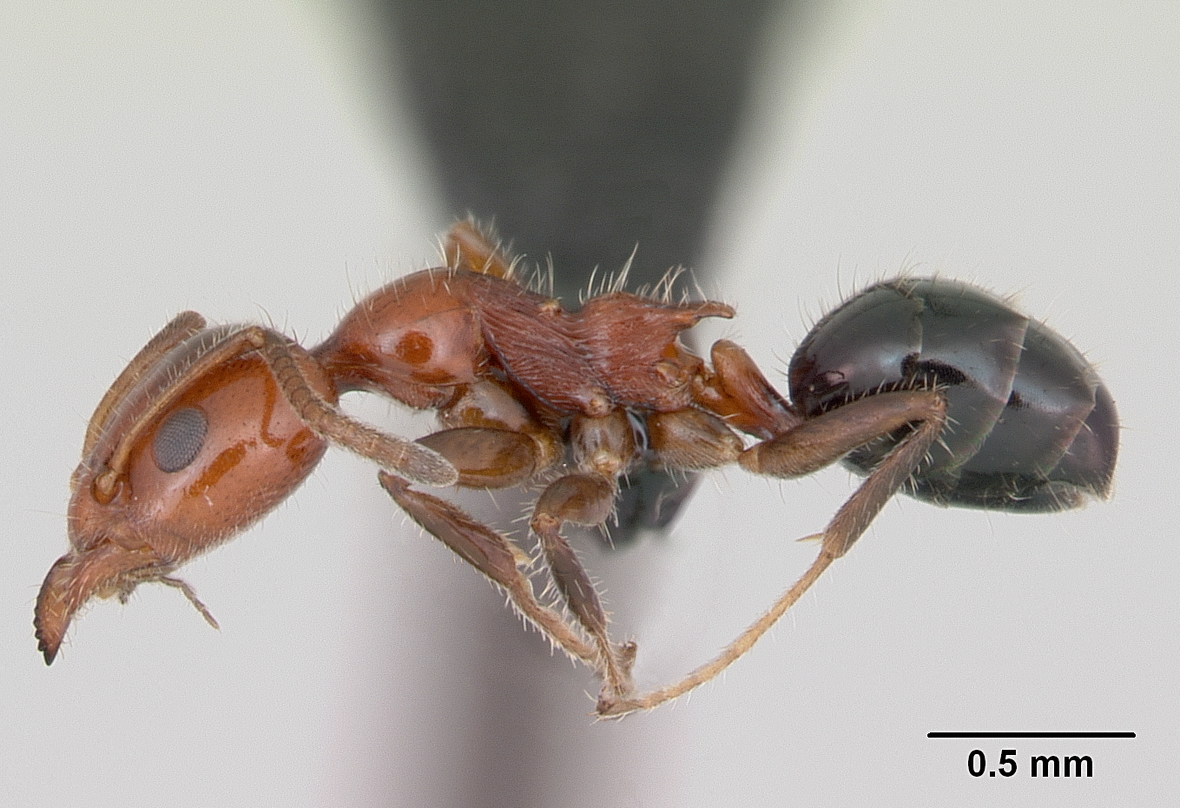
- F. kirbii worker

Scientific classification
- Kingdom: Animalia
- Phylum: Arthropoda
- Class: Insecta
- Order: Hymenoptera
- Family: Formicidae
- Subfamily: Dolichoderinae
- Genus: Froggattella
- Species: F. kirbii

Binomial name
- Froggattella kirbii (Lowne, 1865)

Synonyms
- Froggattella kirbyi bispinosa Forel, 1902; Froggattella kirbyi ianthina Wheeler, W.M., 1936; Froggattella kirbyi laticeps Wheeler, W.M., 1936; Froggattella kirbyi lutescens Wheeler, W.M., 1936; Froggattella kirbyi nigripes Wheeler, W.M., 1936

= Froggattella kirbii =

Species of ant

Froggattella kirbii, commonly known as the common froglet ant is a species of ant in the genus Froggattella. The species is common in drier sclerophyll areas in various states of Australia.
