= Froggattella latispina =

Scientific classification
- Kingdom: Animalia
- Phylum: Arthropoda
- Class: Insecta
- Order: Hymenoptera
- Family: Formicidae
- Subfamily: Dolichoderinae
- Genus: Froggattella
- Species: F. latispina

Binomial name
- Froggattella latispina Wheeler, W.M., 1936

Species of ant

Froggattella latispina is a species of ant in the genus Froggattella. Described by William Morton Wheeler in 1936, the species is endemic to Australia, although it is considered rare.
