= Helenoscoparia =

Scientific classification
- Kingdom: Animalia
- Phylum: Arthropoda
- Clade: Pancrustacea
- Class: Insecta
- Order: Lepidoptera
- Family: Crambidae
- Subfamily: Scopariinae
- Genus: Helenoscoparia; Nuss, 1999

Genus of moths

Helenoscoparia is a genus of moths of the family Crambidae.

== Species ==
- Helenoscoparia helenensis (E. Wollaston, 1879)
- Helenoscoparia lucidalis (Walker in Melliss, 1875)
- Helenoscoparia nigritalis (Walker in Melliss, 1875)
- Helenoscoparia scintillulalis (E. Wollaston, 1879)
- Helenoscoparia transversalis (E. Wollaston, 1879)
