= Helenoscoparia lucidalis =

Scientific classification
- Kingdom: Animalia
- Phylum: Arthropoda
- Class: Insecta
- Order: Lepidoptera
- Family: Crambidae
- Genus: Helenoscoparia
- Species: H. lucidalis

Binomial name
- Helenoscoparia lucidalis (Walker in Melliss, 1875)

Synonyms
- Scoparia lucidalis Walker in Melliss, 1875; Helenoscoparia lusidalis Hampson, 1897

Species of moth

Helenoscoparia lucidalis is a moth in the family Crambidae. It was described by Francis Walker in John Charles Melliss's 1875 book. It is found on Saint Helena.
