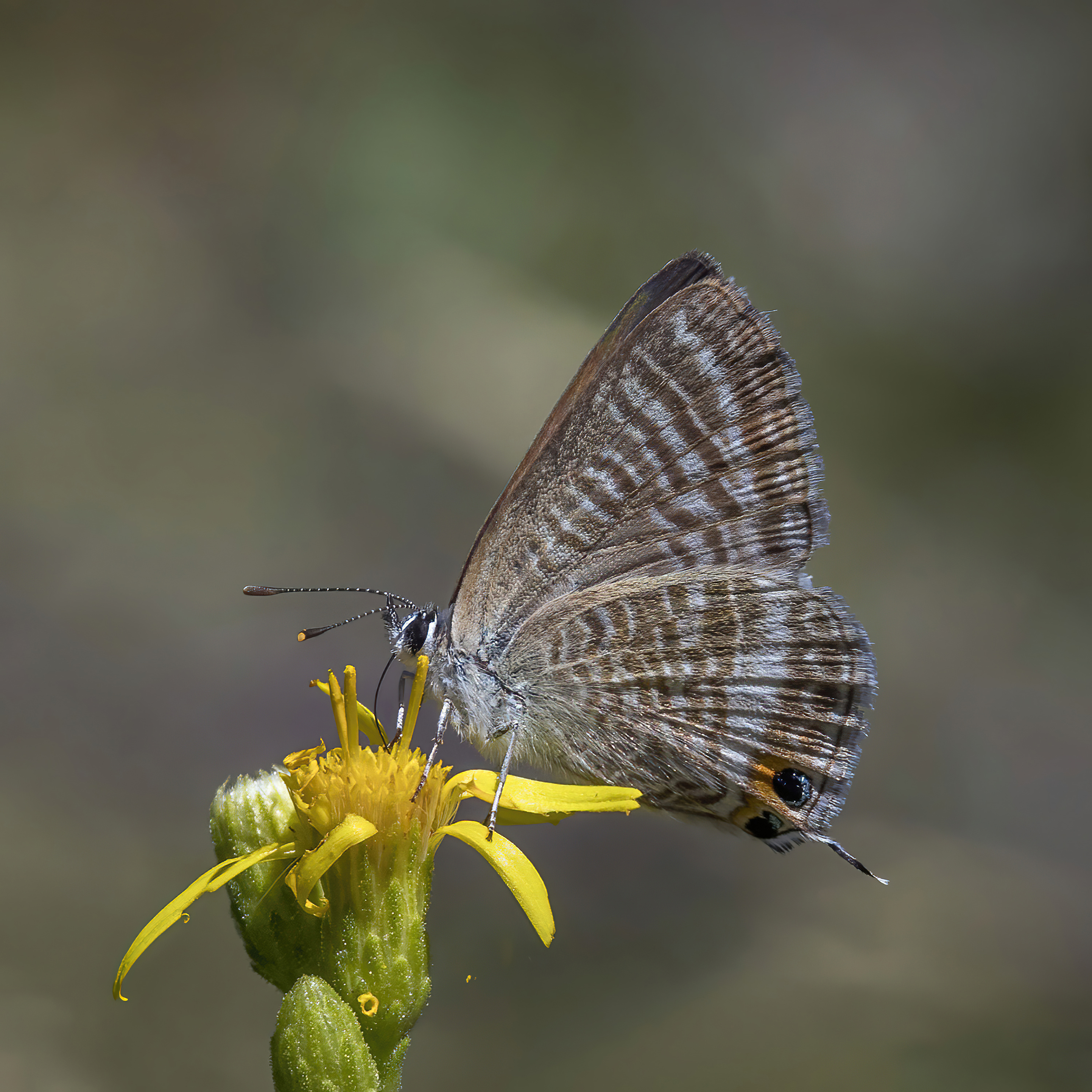
- Lampides boeticus. Underside
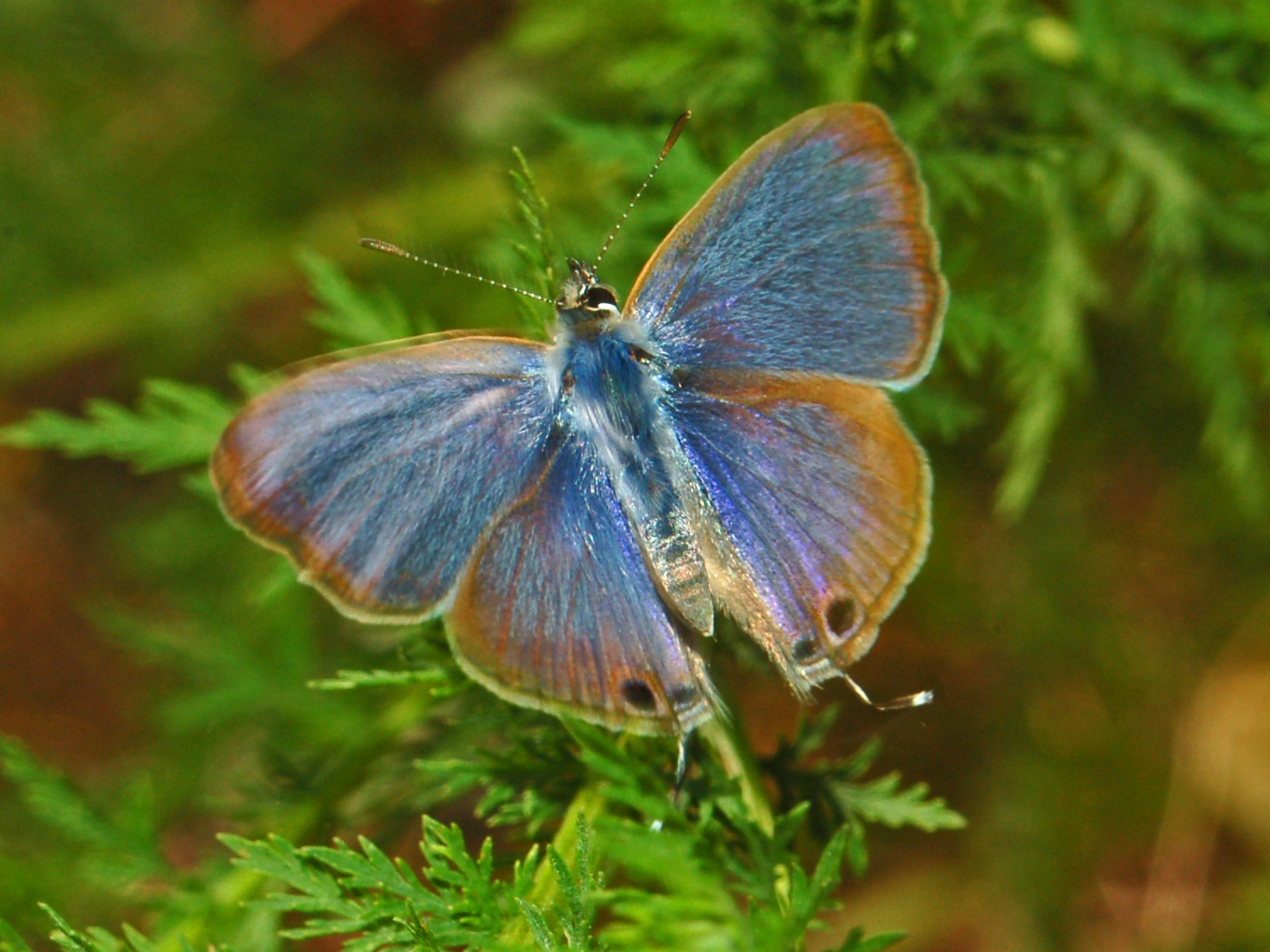
- Lampides boeticus. Male. Upperside

Conservation status
- Least Concern (IUCN 3.1)

Scientific classification
- Kingdom: Animalia
- Phylum: Arthropoda
- Clade: Pancrustacea
- Class: Insecta
- Order: Lepidoptera
- Family: Lycaenidae
- Genus: Lampides
- Species: L. boeticus

Binomial name
- Lampides boeticus (Linnaeus, 1767)

Synonyms
- List: Papilio boeticus Linnaeus, 1767; Papilio damoetes Fabricius, 1775; Lycaena leguminis Scott, 1890 (unavailable syn); Papilio coluteae Fuessly, 1775; Papilio archias Cramer, [1777]; Papilio pisorum Fourcroy, 1785; Papilio boetica Fabricius, 1793; Lampides armeniensis Gerhard, 1882; Polyommatus bagus Distant, 1886; Lampides grisescens Tutt, [1907]; Lampides caerulea Tutt, [1907]; Lampides caeruleafasciata Tutt, [1907]; Lampides clara Tutt, [1907]; Lampides clarafasciata Tutt, [1907]; Lampides coerulea Tutt, [1907]; Lampides ab. fasciata Tutt, [1907]; Lampides fusca Tutt, [1907]; Lampides ab. fuscafasciata Tutt, [1907]; Lampides typicamarginata Tutt, [1907]; Lampides ab. major Tutt, [1907]; Lampides minor Tutt, [1907]; Lampides typicafasciata Tutt, [1907]; Lampides ab. albovittata Oberthür, 1910; Lampides ab. ecaudata Oberthür, 1910; Polyommatus yanagawensis Hori, 1923; Lampides obsoleta Evans, [1925]; Lampides fusca de Sagarra, 1926; Lycaena ab. minor Pionneau, 1928; Lampides infuscata Querci, 1932; Lampides ab. kawachensis Hirose, 1933; Lampides anamariae Gómez Bustillo, 1973; Lampides boeticus f. michaeli Kroon, 1980

= Lampides boeticus =

Long-tailed pea-blue

Species of butterfly

Lampides boeticus, the pea blue, or long-tailed blue, is a small butterfly that belongs to the lycaenids or gossamer-winged family.

== Etymology ==
The Latin species name boeticus refers to Baetica, a province of the Roman Empire in the Iberian Peninsula . Its common name refers to the long streamers on its hind wings, the male's bright iridescent blue colour, and peas, which is the typical host plant of the butterfly.

== Taxonomy ==
This species was first described by Carl Linnaeus in 1767 and was initially named Papilio boeticus.

== Distribution ==
This species can be found in Europe, Africa, South and Southeast Asia, and Australia. It is also found in the Hawaiian islands. It is also found in the Maldives.In New Zealand this species is regarded as being self introduced as was first observed in November 1965.

== Habitat ==
This species inhabits the edge of forests, mountain meadows and hot flowery places at an elevation up to 2,700 metres (8,900 ft) above sea level.

== Description ==
Lampides boeticus in Tokyo, Japan.

The wingspan is 24–32 mm for males and 24–34 mm for females. In these small butterflies (although unusually large for their family) the males have a mainly blue violet upper face of the wings with the brown edges, while the females have only a small amount of blue colour in the centre of the wings (sexual dimorphism). Both sexes have a thin, long tail in the hindwings and two black spots in the anal angle. The underface of the wings is ocher and adorned with white markings and with a larger white submarginal streak.

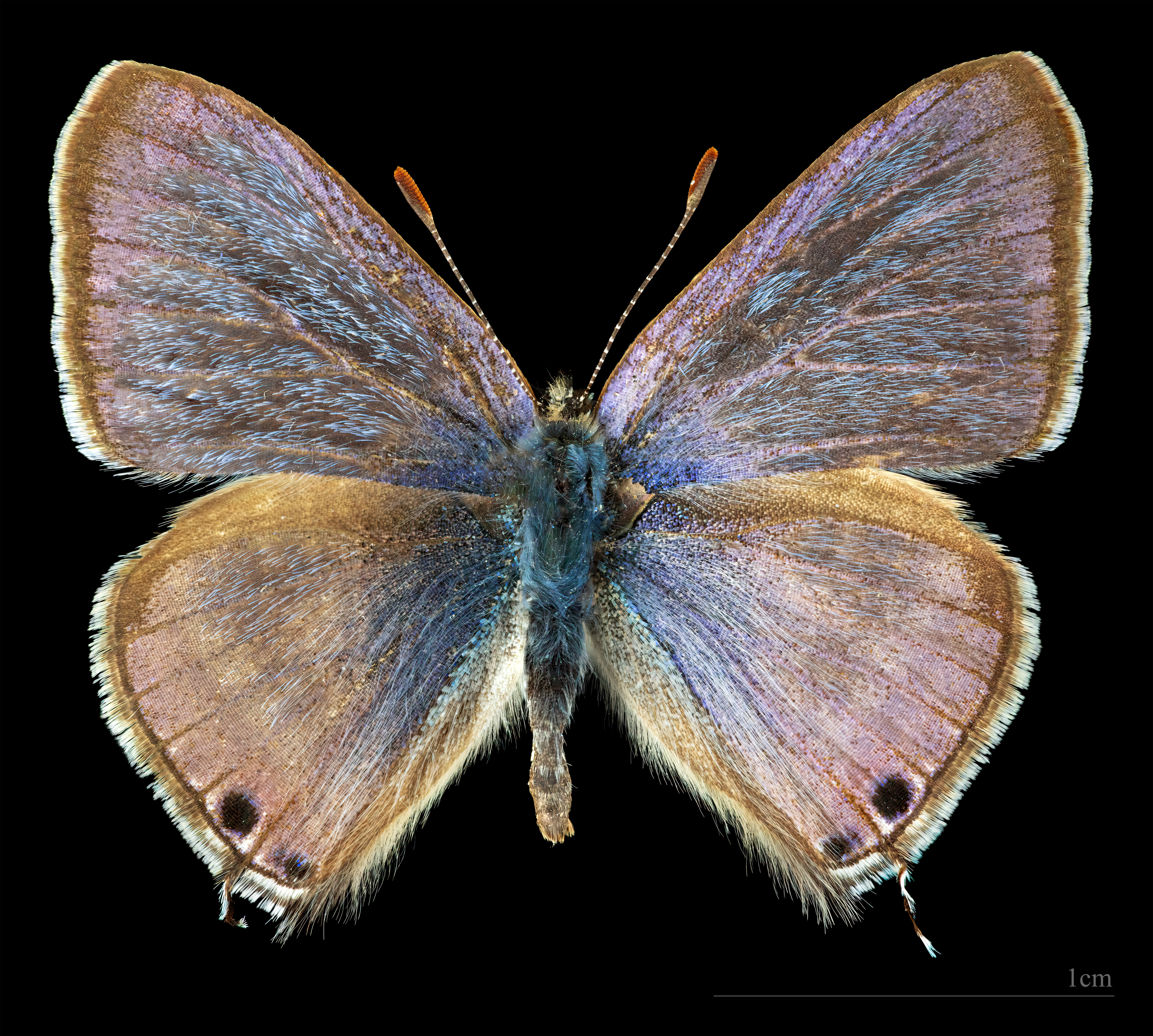
Lampides boeticus ♂

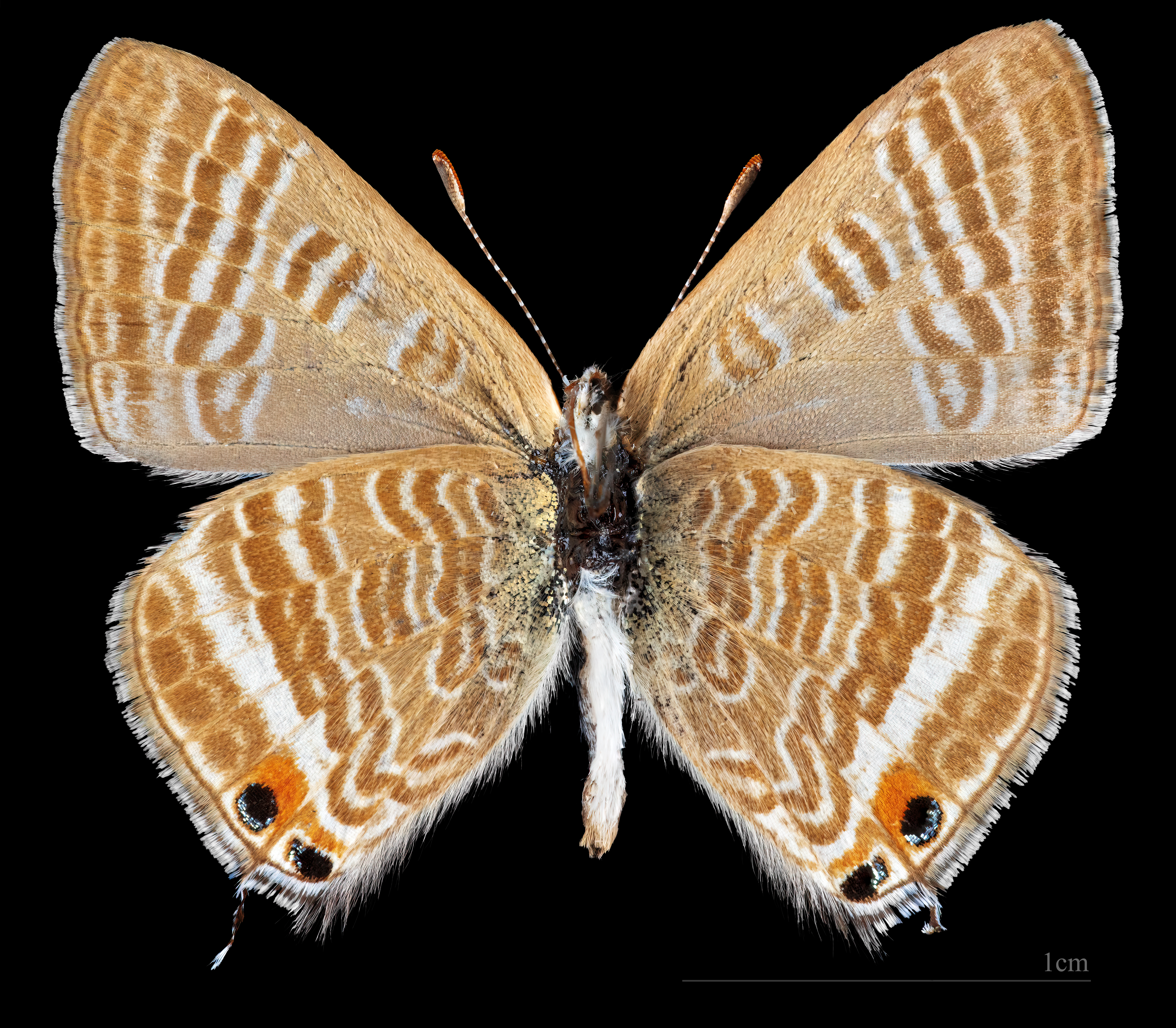
Lampides boeticus ♂ △

The underface of each hindwing shows a pair of small black eye-spots beside each tail, with an orange marginal spots at the anal angle. This species is rather similar and it can be confused with Leptotes pirithous and Cacyreus marshalli although the pea-blue is significantly larger than both species.

Male. Upperside violet-blue, with hair-like, whitish scales dispersed over the entire surface of both wings. Forewing with costal and outermarginal brown line, the latter often with a little inward brown suffusion, Hindwing with a similar marginal line, a rather large round black subterminal spot in interspace 2, a smaller spot in interspace 1, each spot ringed, sometimes with pale blue, sometimes with pale orange-ochreous. Cilia white, with a brown basal band; tail black, tipped with white. Underside grey with a slight ochreous tinge, markings brownish. Forewing with a pair of bars across the middle of the cell, and a pair across the end, a pair in the disc, from near the costa to vein 3, continued a little inwards to the hinder margin in two pieces, all with white inside the pairs. Hindwing with eight or nine more or less sinuous brown fasciae at even distances apart, all the brown lines with white marks between them; both wings with brown terminal line, white subterminal line, then a series of white lunules, followed by white marks, more or less in echelon on the forewing, formed into a white narrow band on the hindwing, the whole surface of both wings having these markings at even distances apart; and there are small jet black subterminal spots, containing metallic, blue-green scales, broadly surrounded by orange, in interspaces 1 and 2. Female. Upperside with some slight brownish suffusion, some shining blue scales at the base of both wings and in the interior portion of the forewing; on the hindwing there are two spots in interspaces 1 and 2 as in the male, and some pale brown spots in continuation up the wing, all outwardly edged by a fine white subterminal line, and across the disc there is a narrow white band, divided by the veins. Underside as in the male. Antennae black, ringed with white; head and body blackish-brown above with blue pubescence, white beneath.

— Charles Swinhoe, Lepidoptera Indica. Vol. VIII

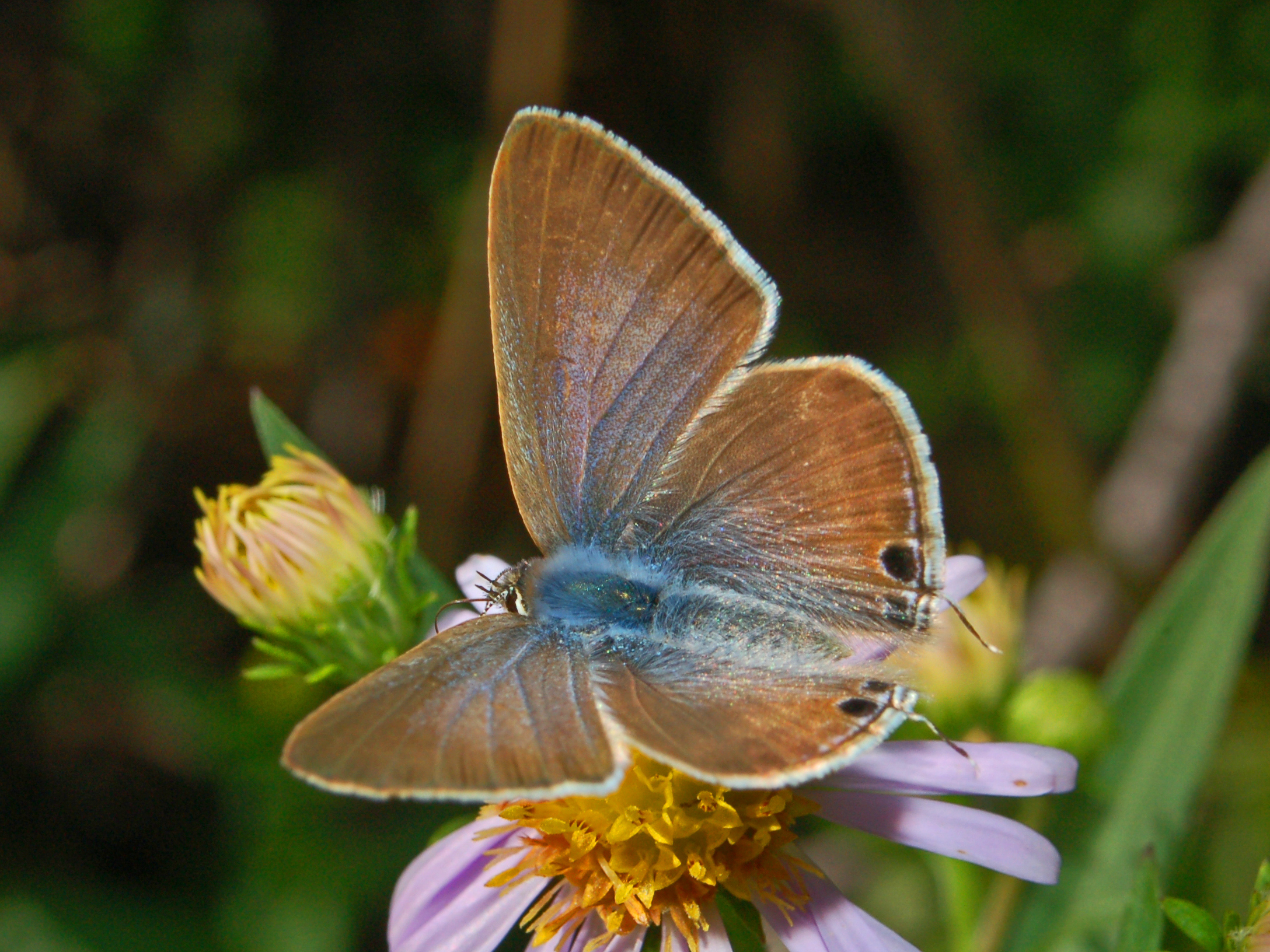
Female of Lampides boeticus

== Ecology ==
This species may have three generations a year. Adults fly from February to early November and are strong migrants. Eggs are white with a greenish tinge and have a disc-shaped form. They can reach a diameter of 0.5 mm. They are laid singly on the flower buds of the host plants.

Old caterpillars are green or reddish-brown, with dark dorsal stripe. They reach a length of 14–15 mm. Pupae reach a length of 9–10 mm. They are light grayish-brown with medium-sized dark spots and dark dorsal stripe.

The larvae feed on flowers, seeds and pods of many Fabaceae species, including Medicago, Crotalaria, Polygala, Sutherlandia, Dolichos, Cytisus, Spartium and Lathyrus species. It has also been recorded on Crotolaria pallida.

In Australia, the larvae are occasionally attended by ants in the genera Froggattella, Iridomyrmex or Camponotus.

Life cycle of Lampides boeticus

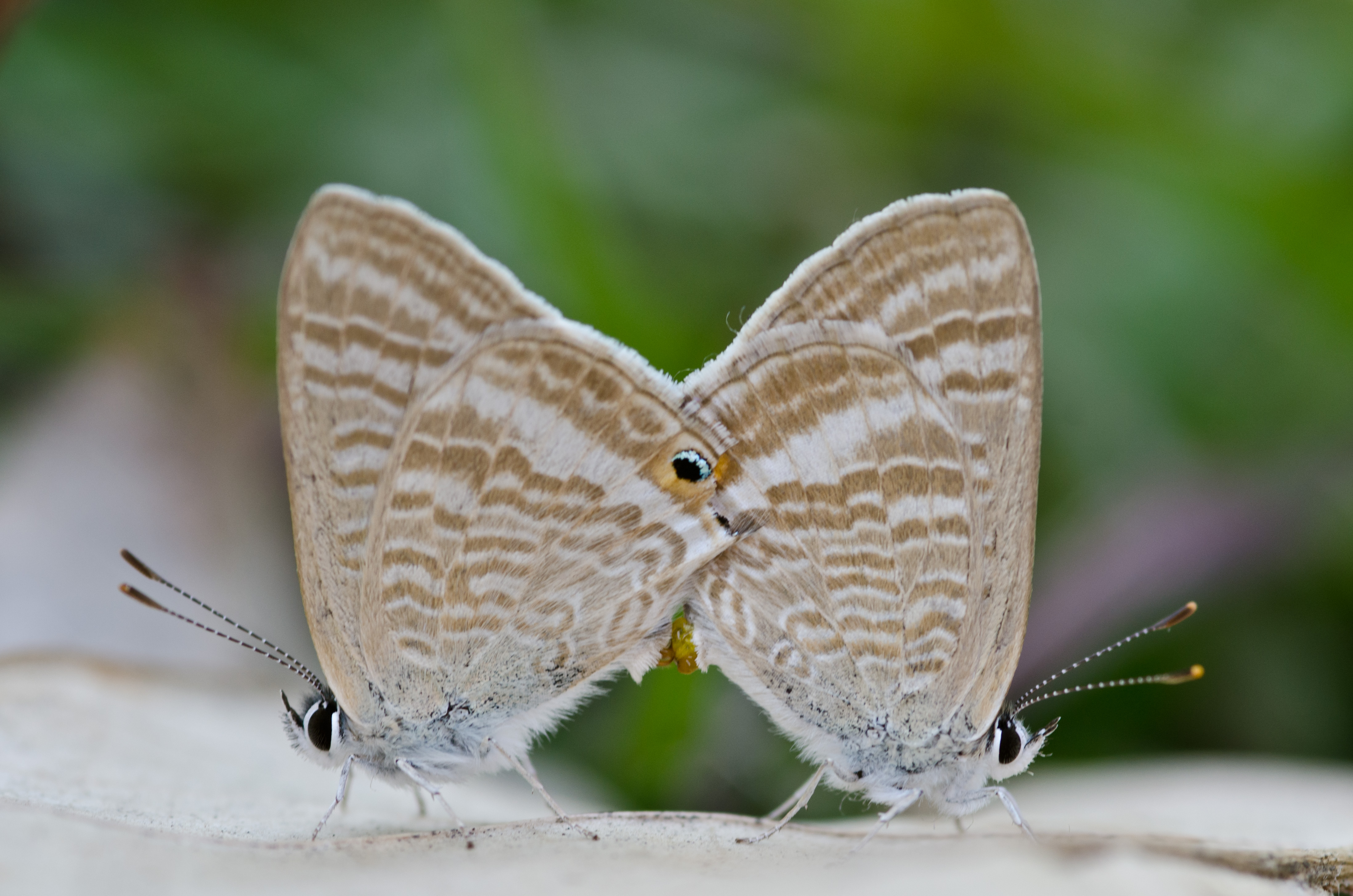
Mating pair

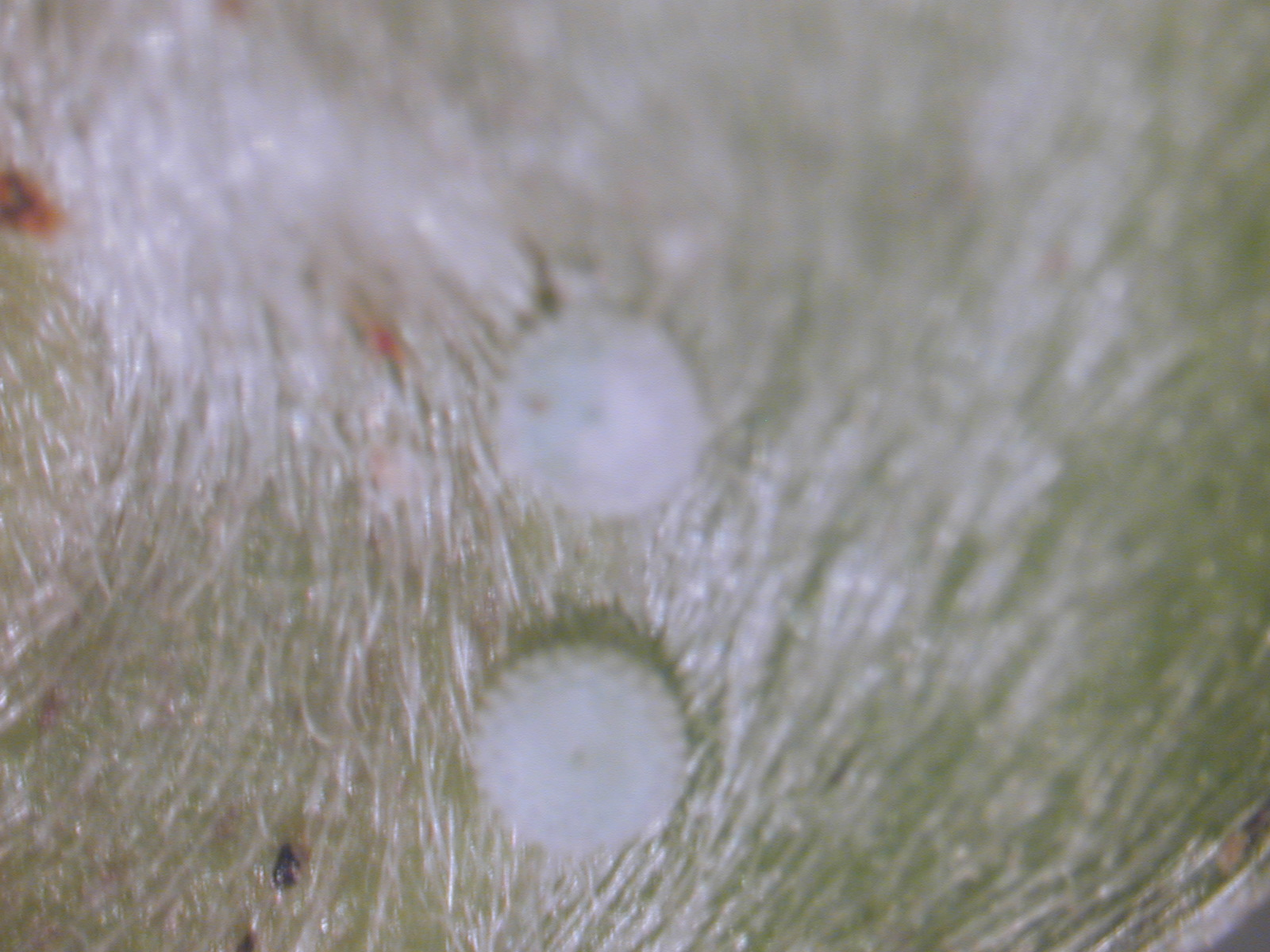
Egg

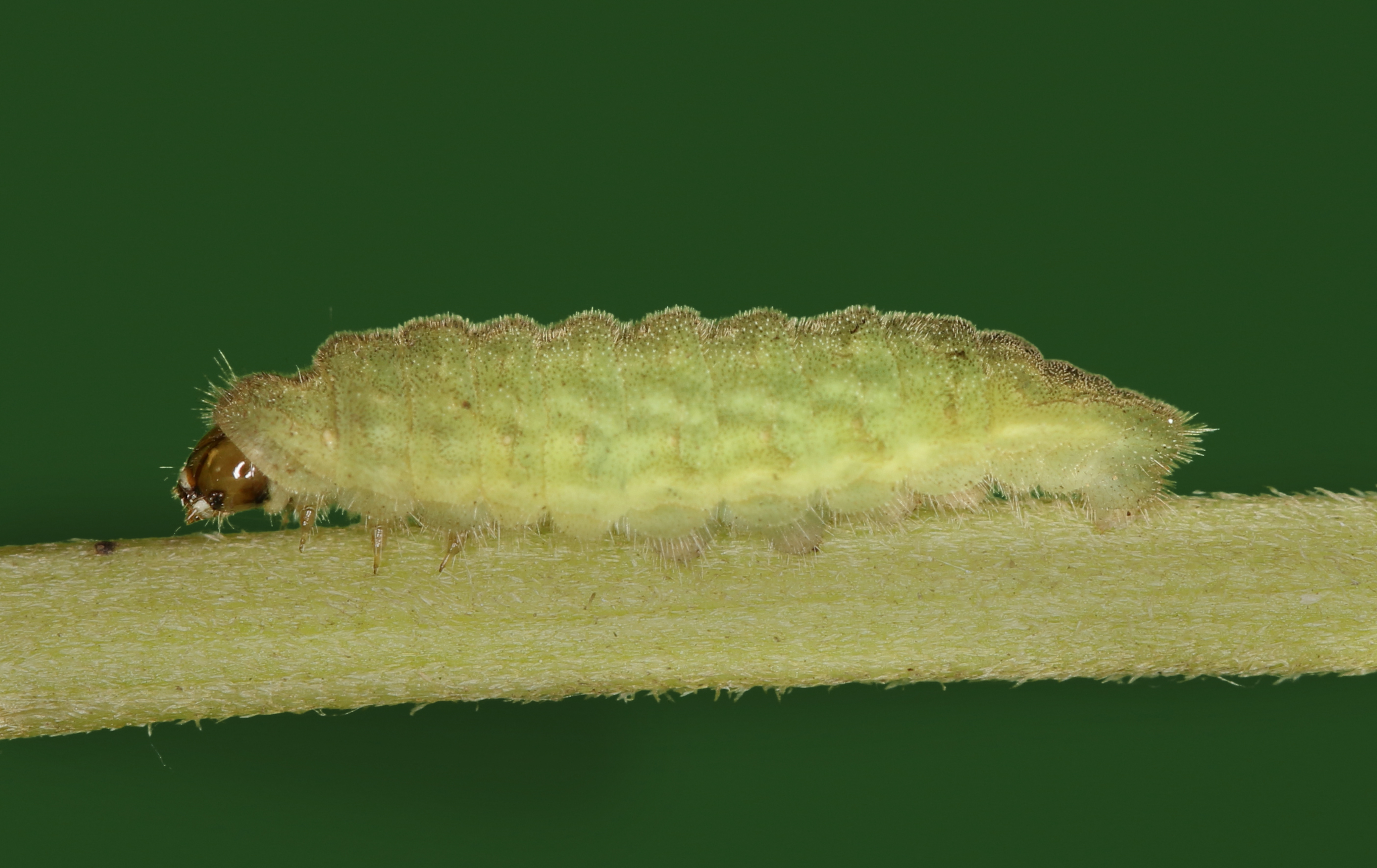
Caterpillar

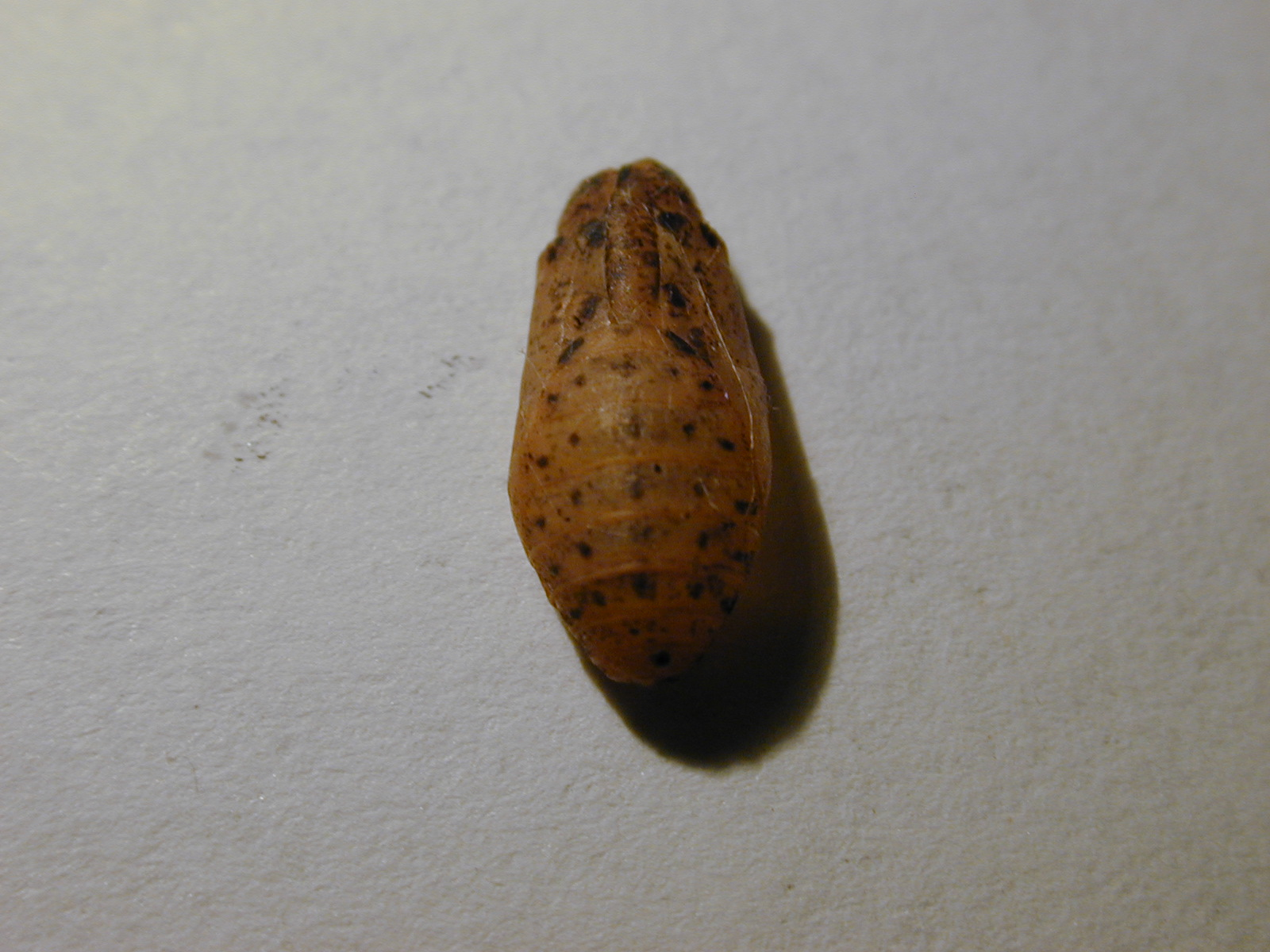
Pupa

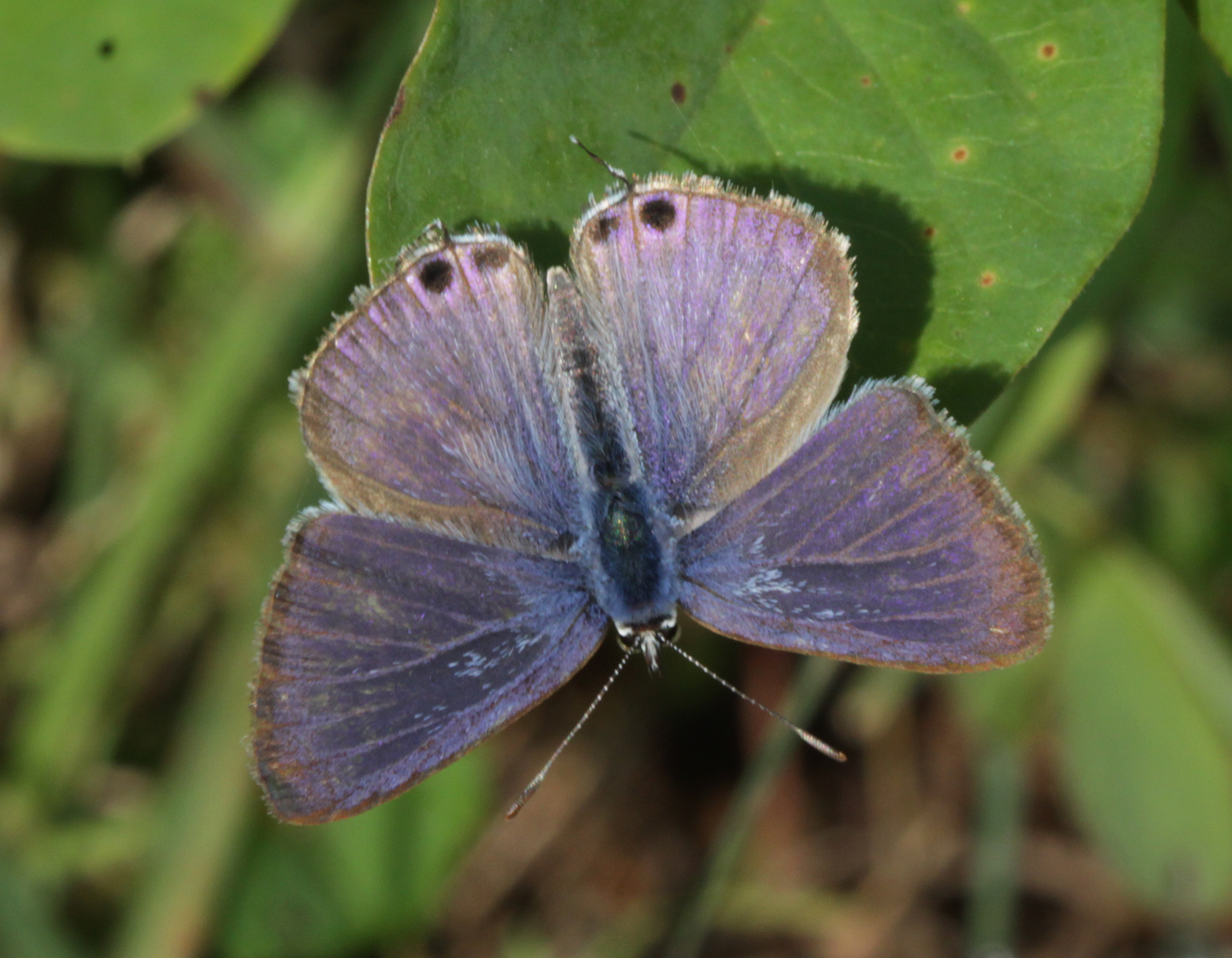
Imago (upper side)

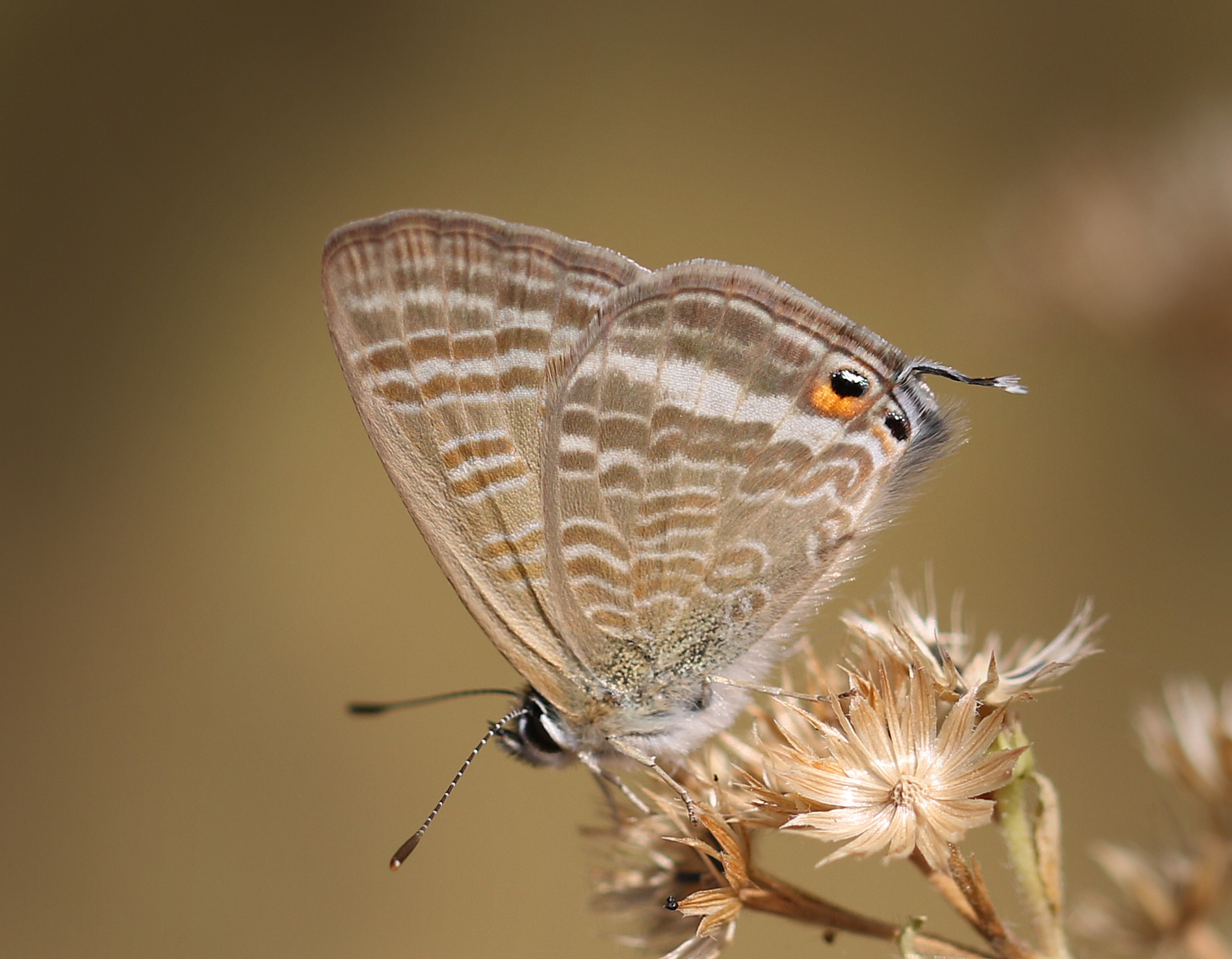
Imago (underside)

== See also ==
- List of butterflies of Australia
- List of butterflies of India
- List of butterflies of India (Lycaenidae)
- List of butterflies of Menorca

== Bibliography ==
- Evans, W.H. (1932). The Identification of Indian Butterflies (2nd ed.). Mumbai, India: Bombay Natural History Society.
- Gaonkar, Harish (1996). Butterflies of the Western Ghats, India (including Sri Lanka) - A Biodiversity Assessment of a Threatened Mountain System. Bangalore, India: Centre for Ecological Sciences.
- Haribal, Meena (1992). The Butterflies of Sikkim Himalaya and Their Natural History. Gangtok, Sikkim, India: Sikkim Nature Conservation Foundation.
- Kunte, Krushnamegh (2000). Butterflies of Peninsular India. India, A Lifescape. Hyderabad, India: Universities Press. ISBN 978-8173713545.
- Gay, Thomas; Kehimkar, Isaac David; Punetha, Jagdish Chandra (1992). Common Butterflies of India. Nature Guides. Bombay, India: World Wide Fund for Nature-India by Oxford University Press. ISBN 978-0195631647.
- Wynter-Blyth, Mark Alexander (2009) [1957]. Butterflies of the Indian Region. Bombay, India: Bombay Natural History Society. ISBN 978-8170192329.
- Tom Tolman et Richard Lewington, Guide des papillons d'Europe et d'Afrique du Nord, Delachaux et Niestlé, 1997 (ISBN 978-2-603-01649-7)
