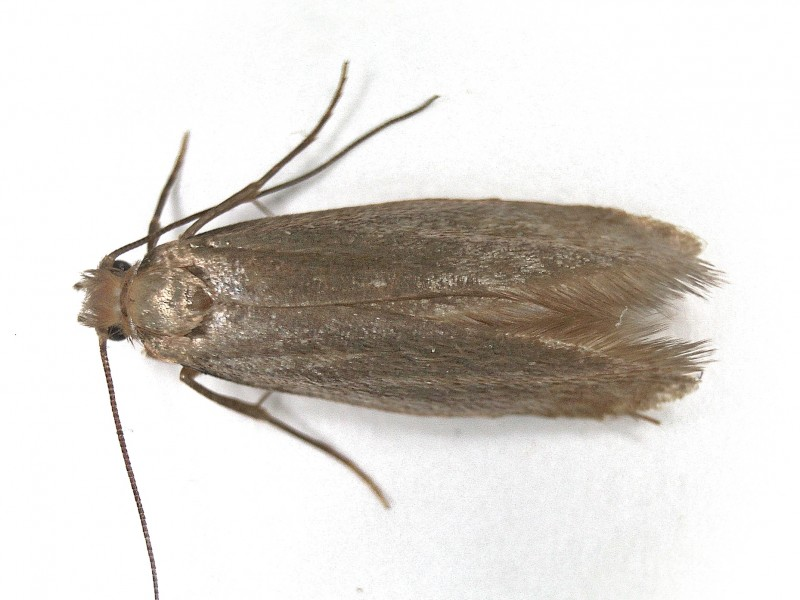

Scientific classification
- Kingdom: Animalia
- Phylum: Arthropoda
- Clade: Pancrustacea
- Class: Insecta
- Order: Lepidoptera
- Family: Tineidae
- Genus: Tinea
- Species: T. columbariella

Binomial name
- Tinea columbariella Wocke, 1877

= Tinea columbariella =

Species of moth

Tinea columbariella is a moth belonging to the family Tineidae. The species was first described by Wocke in 1877.

It has a cosmopolitan distribution.

== Description ==
Wingspan 9–15 mm. Head with rust brown hair. Antennae just over half the front wing length. The forewings dark grey-brown with a black spot on the disc and a basal hyaline spot. Hindwings light grey. Difficult to distinguish from Tinea pellionella, Tinea dubiella and Tinea svenssoni but the genitalia are diagnostic.

== Biology ==
Flies at night (and comes to light) from June to August. Found indoors in lofts, barns, stables and the like. The case-bearing larva is whitish with a dark head and feeds on nesting material or feathers in birds nests.
