= Zovax venus =

Scientific classification
- Kingdom: Animalia
- Phylum: Arthropoda
- Clade: Pancrustacea
- Class: Insecta
- Order: Lepidoptera
- Family: Crambidae
- Subfamily: Crambinae
- Tribe: Ancylolomiini
- Genus: Zovax
- Species: Z. venus

Binomial name
- Zovax venus Bassi, 2013

Species of moth

Zovax venus is a moth in the family Crambidae. It was described by Graziano Bassi in 2013. It is found in Botswana, Malawi, Mozambique, Namibia and Zimbabwe.
