= Zovax =

Scientific classification
- Domain: Eukaryota
- Kingdom: Animalia
- Phylum: Arthropoda
- Class: Insecta
- Order: Lepidoptera
- Family: Crambidae
- Subfamily: Crambinae
- Tribe: Ancylolomiini
- Genus: Zovax; Błeszyński, 1962

Genus of insects

Zovax is a genus of moths of the family Crambidae described by Stanisław Błeszyński in 1962.

== Species ==
- Zovax vangoghi Bleszynski, 1965
- Zovax venus Bassi, 2013
- Zovax whiteheadii (E. Wollaston, 1879)
