= Alice Elizabeth Louisa Melliss =

British scientific illustrator (1846–1906)

- Born: Alice Elizabeth Louise Stace; 1846; Colony of Barbados
- Died: December 8, 1909 (aged 62–63); Hampstead
- Citizenship: United Kingdom of Great Britain and Ireland
- Occupations: biologist botanical illustrator
- Spouse: John Charles Melliss

Alice Elizabeth Louisa Melliss (née Stace; 1846–1909) was a British botanical illustrator. She illustrated the book St. Helena: a physical, historical, and topographical description of the island, including its geology, fauna, flora and meteorology under the name Mrs. J. C. Melliss.

== Biography ==
Melliss was born on 29 April 1846 in the then colony of Barbados. Her father was William C. Stace, an officer in the Royal Engineers who was made a colonel in 1858. She married John Charles Melliss on 20 July 1869 in Chipperfield in Hertfordshire, England. Their son, Hugh John Melliss, was born in 1880.

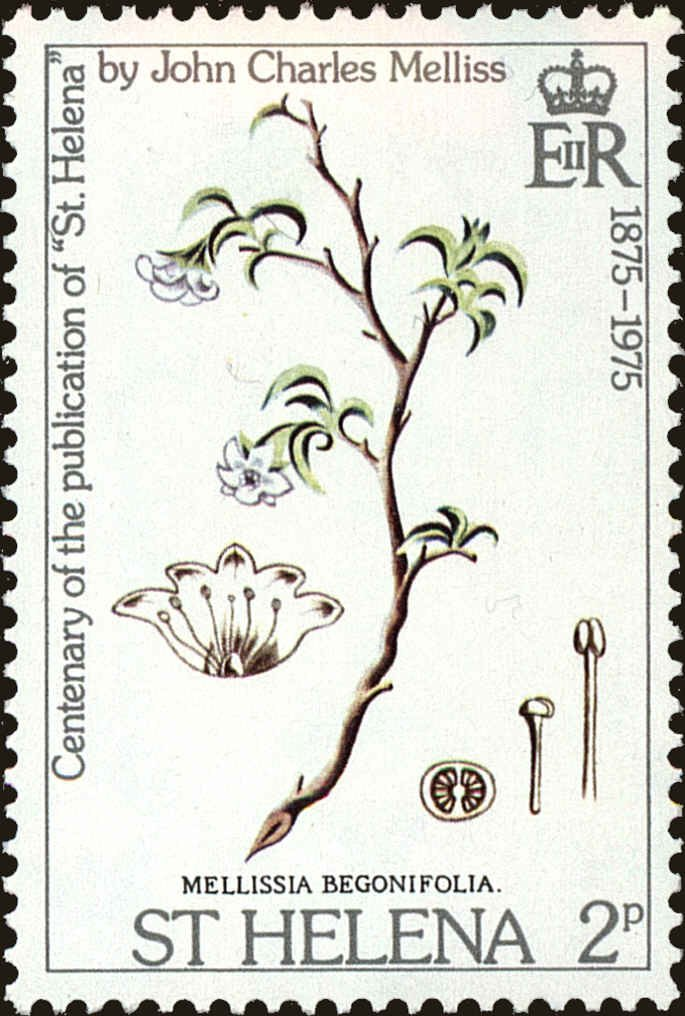
Postage stamp issued in 1975 to mark the centenary of the publication of "St Helena" by J.C. Melliss

Melliss (as Mrs. J. C. Melliss) illustrated the botanical plates of the 1875 book St. Helena: a physical, historical, and topographical description of the island, including its geology, fauna, flora and meteorology, authored by her husband, John Charles Melliss. She is credited on plates as A. Melliss. This book included first descriptions of multiple species, including the now extinct Saint Helena olive, Nesiota elliptica. A review of the book in the journal Nature described Melliss' plates as "effective illustrations". Writing in The Academy, H W Bates described "the full-page coloured drawings of all the endemic flowering plants, by Mrs Melliss, [as] especially interesting".

Melliss died on 8 December 1909 at the age of 63 in Hampstead in London, England.

== Legacy ==
Although the book is now 150 years old, this book is still considered a major authority on St. Helena's flora. The St. Helena Post Office published a set of four stamps featuring illustrations from this book in 1975, including one of her botanical illustrations.
