= Helenoscoparia transversalis =

Scientific classification
- Kingdom: Animalia
- Phylum: Arthropoda
- Class: Insecta
- Order: Lepidoptera
- Family: Crambidae
- Genus: Helenoscoparia
- Species: H. transversalis

Binomial name
- Helenoscoparia transversalis (E. Wollaston, 1879)

Synonyms
- Scoparia transversalis E. Wollaston, 1879

Species of moth

Helenoscoparia transversalis is a moth in the family Crambidae. It was described by Edith Wollaston in 1879. It is found on Saint Helena.

The larvae have been recorded feeding on lichens.
