= Helenoscoparia helenensis =

Scientific classification
- Kingdom: Animalia
- Phylum: Arthropoda
- Class: Insecta
- Order: Lepidoptera
- Family: Crambidae
- Genus: Helenoscoparia
- Species: H. helenensis

Binomial name
- Helenoscoparia helenensis (E. Wollaston, 1879)

Synonyms
- Scoparia helenensis E. Wollaston, 1879

Species of moth

Helenoscoparia helenensis is a moth in the family Crambidae. It was described by Edith Wollaston in 1879. It is found on Saint Helena.
