= Zovax whiteheadii =

Scientific classification
- Kingdom: Animalia
- Phylum: Arthropoda
- Clade: Pancrustacea
- Class: Insecta
- Order: Lepidoptera
- Family: Crambidae
- Subfamily: Crambinae
- Tribe: Ancylolomiini
- Genus: Zovax
- Species: Z. whiteheadii

Binomial name
- Zovax whiteheadii (E. Wollaston, 1879)

Synonyms
- Prionapteryx whiteheadii E. Wollaston, 1879

Species of moth

Zovax whiteheadii is a moth in the family Crambidae. It was described by Edith Wollaston in 1879. It is found on Saint Helena.
