= Scopula separata =

Conservation status
- Vulnerable (IUCN 3.1)

Scientific classification
- Kingdom: Animalia
- Phylum: Arthropoda
- Class: Insecta
- Order: Lepidoptera
- Family: Geometridae
- Genus: Scopula
- Species: S. separata

Binomial name
- Scopula separata (Walker, 1875)

Synonyms
- Acidalia separata Walker, 1875; Acidalia separata ab. atlantica Walker, 1875

Species of geometer moth in subfamily Sterrhinae

Scopula separata is a moth of the family Geometridae. It is found on Saint Helena. It is vulnerable according to the IUCN Redlist due to invasive plant species causing the food that are needed by the caterpillars to decrease. The invasion of non-native predators such as Hemidactylus frenatus and Scolopendra morsitans are also affecting the conservation of the insect. 51-60 percent of the population is currently protected.
