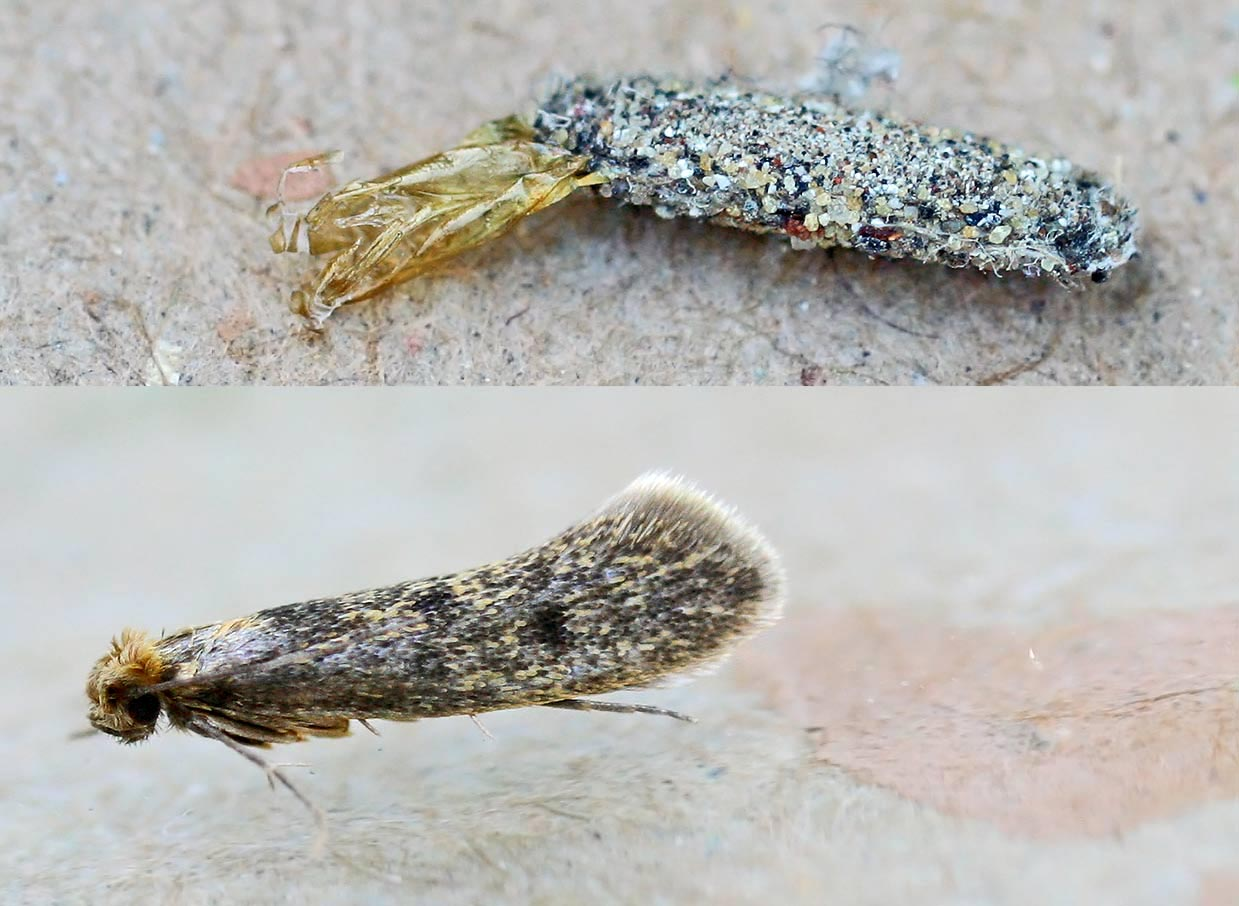
- Case with pupal skin (above); Adult moth (below)
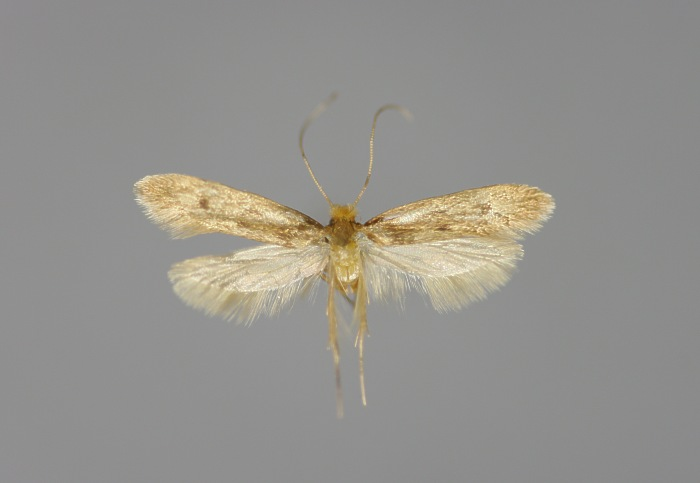
- Museum specimen

Scientific classification
- Kingdom: Animalia
- Phylum: Arthropoda
- Clade: Pancrustacea
- Class: Insecta
- Order: Lepidoptera
- Family: Tineidae
- Genus: Tinea
- Species: T. pellionella

Binomial name
- Tinea pellionella Linnaeus, 1758

Synonyms
- Phalaena (Tinea) pellionella Linnaeus, 1758; Phalaena zoolegella Scopoli, 1763; Tinea demiurga Meyrick, 1920; Tinea gerasimovi Zagulajev, 1978; Tinea pelliomella (lapsus)

= Tinea pellionella =

Case-bearing clothes moth

Species of moth

Tinea pellionella, the case-bearing clothes moth, is a species of tineoid moth in the family Tineidae, the fungus moths. This species has a cosmopolitan distribution, occurring nearly worldwide.

== Taxonomy ==
Being a widespread species and often affiliated with humans, T. pellionella was among the first moths to be scientifically described in the modern sense. At that time most moths were included in a single genus "Phalaena", but Tinea was already recognized as a distinct subgenus. Some later researchers who studied this moth erroneously believed they had discovered populations formerly unknown to science and described them as new species, but today these are all included within T. pellionella. Obsolete scientific names for this moth thus may be encountered in the literature, and include:

- Phalaena (Tinea) pellionella Linnaeus, 1758
- Phalaena zoolegella Scopoli, 1763
- Tinea demiurga Meyrick, 1920
- Tinea gerasimovi Zagulajev, 1978
- Tinea pelliomella (lapsus)

It is the type species of the genus Tinea, which in turn is the type genus of the subfamily, family, as well as the superfamily Tineoidea. Its scientific name is derived from "tinea", a generic term for micromoths, and the Latin term for a furrier, pellionellus.

Another common name is "bagworm" due to the case that their larvae carry around, but not to be confused with the Psychidae that are also called "bagworms" in English.

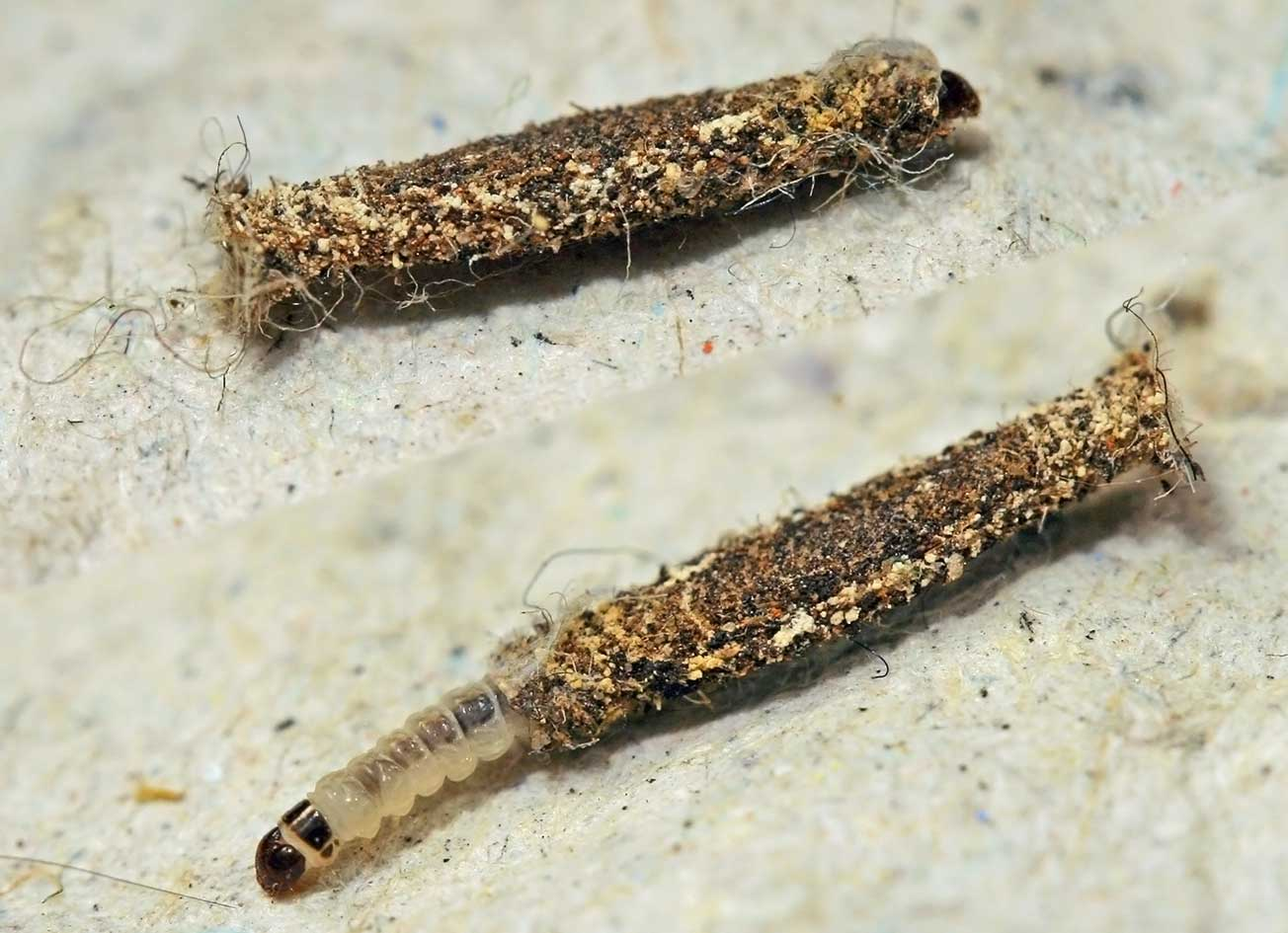
Cased larvae

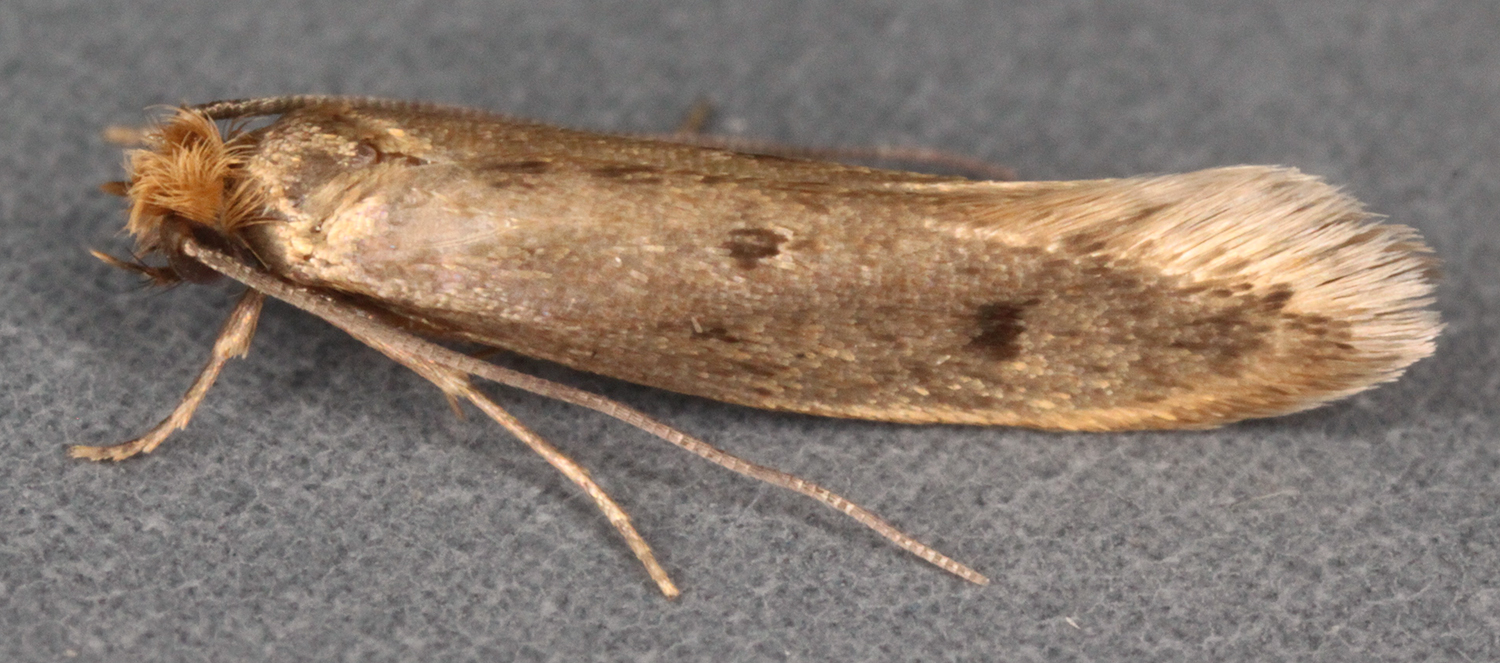
Imago

== Description ==
It is silvery grey to shiny light brown in color, with dark grayish hairs on the top of its head. The adult of this species has a wingspan of 9 to 16 millimeters. Its forewings are grizzled brown with one large spot and a few smaller, indistinct black spots. The hindwings are plain pale brown-grey. The forewings, but especially the hindwings are surrounded by a hairy fringe. Difficult to distinguish from Tinea columbariella, Tinea dubiella and Tinea svenssoni but the genitalia are diagnostic.

The larva eats mainly fibrous keratin, such as hairs and feathers. It can become a pest when it feeds on carpets, furs, upholstery, and woolen fabrics. It also consumes detritus, cobwebs, bird nests (particularly of the domestic pigeon), stored vegetable produce and wallpaper. It stays inside a snug case it constructs from debris such as fibers and hairs.

== Biology ==
It is synanthropic; the adult is typically encountered during summer and early autumn, but populations that live in human dwellings may be seen at other times of the year.

Control measures for the case-bearing clothes moth are similar to those for the common clothes moth (Tineola bisselliella), and include physical, chemical, and biological measures.

== Bibliography ==
- Gaedike, Reinhard (2019). Tineidae II : Myrmecozelinae, Perissomasticinae, Tineinae, Hieroxestinae, Teichobiinae and Stathmopolitinae Microlepidoptera of Europe (PDF). Vol. 9. Leiden: Brill. ISBN 978-90-04-38750-8. Archived from the original on 13 November 2025.
- Petersen, Günther (1957-11-30). "Die Genitalien der paläarktischen Tineiden (Lepidoptera: Tineidae)". Beiträge zur Entomologie = Contributions to Entomology (in German). 7 (5–6): 557–595. doi:10.21248/contrib.entomol.7.5-6.557-595. ISSN 2511-6428. Archived from the original on 13 November 2025.
