= Glyphipterix semilunaris =

Scientific classification
- Kingdom: Animalia
- Phylum: Arthropoda
- Clade: Pancrustacea
- Class: Insecta
- Order: Lepidoptera
- Family: Glyphipterigidae
- Genus: Glyphipterix
- Species: G. semilunaris

Binomial name
- Glyphipterix semilunaris E. Wollaston, 1879

Species of moth

Glyphipterix semilunaris is a species of moth in the family Glyphipterigidae. It was described by Edith Wollaston in 1879 and is known from Saint Helena in the South Atlantic Ocean.
