= Phyllonorycter aurifascia =

Scientific classification
- Kingdom: Animalia
- Phylum: Arthropoda
- Class: Insecta
- Order: Lepidoptera
- Family: Gracillariidae
- Genus: Phyllonorycter
- Species: P. aurifascia

Binomial name
- Phyllonorycter aurifascia (Walker, 1875)

Synonyms
- Lithocolletis aurifascia Walker, 1875; Phyllonorycter aurifascia

Species of moth

“Lithocolletis” aurifascia is a moth of the family Gracillariidae. It is known from Saint Helena.

The larvae feed on Commidendrum robustum. They probably mine the leaves of their host plant.

== Taxonomy ==
A 2012 study revealed that the species does not belong to Lithocolletinae according to external morphology.
