= Helenoscoparia scintillulalis =

Scientific classification
- Kingdom: Animalia
- Phylum: Arthropoda
- Class: Insecta
- Order: Lepidoptera
- Family: Crambidae
- Genus: Helenoscoparia
- Species: H. scintillulalis

Binomial name
- Helenoscoparia scintillulalis (E. Wollaston, 1879)

Synonyms
- Scoparia scintillulalis E. Wollaston, 1879

Species of moth

Helenoscoparia scintillulalis is a moth in the family Crambidae. It was described by Edith Wollaston in 1879. It is found on Saint Helena.
