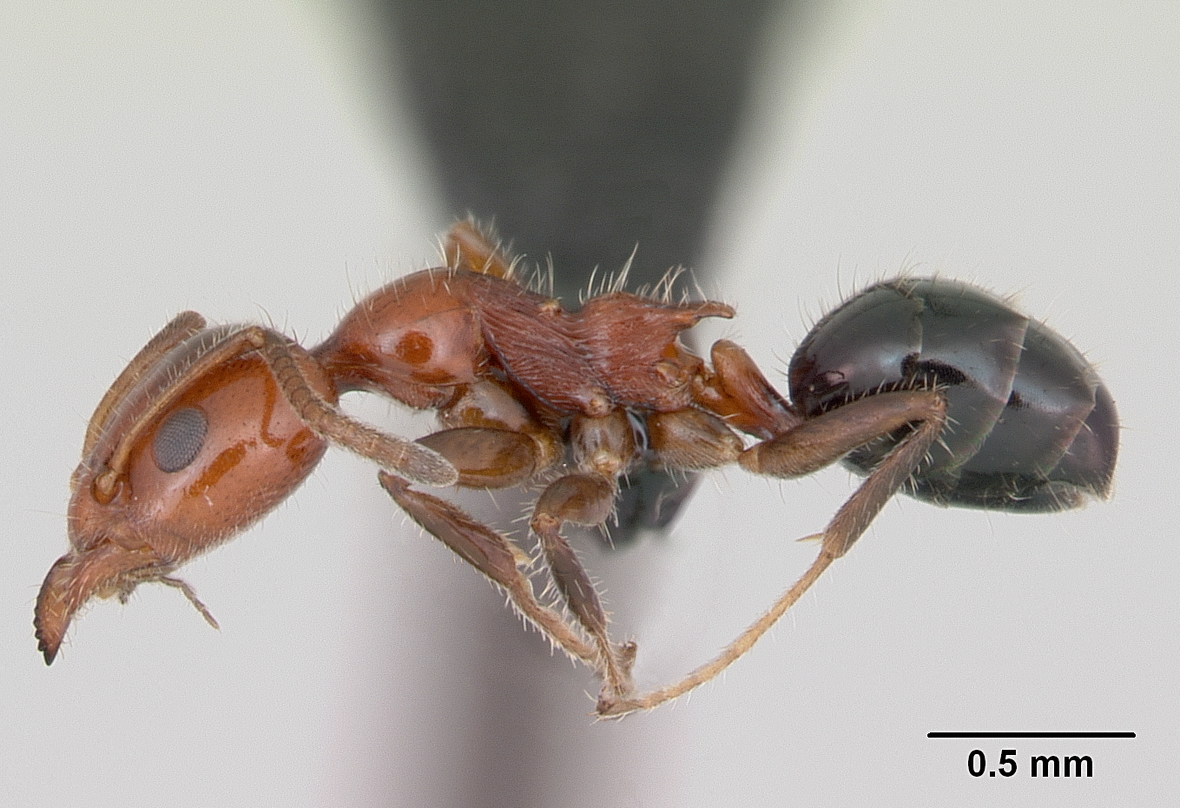
- Froggattella kirbii worker

Scientific classification
- Kingdom: Animalia
- Phylum: Arthropoda
- Class: Insecta
- Order: Hymenoptera
- Family: Formicidae
- Subfamily: Dolichoderinae
- Tribe: Leptomyrmecini
- Genus: Froggattella; Forel, 1902

Type species
- Acantholepis kirbii

Diversity
- 2 species

= Froggattella =

Genus of ants

Froggattella is a genus of ants in the subfamily Dolichoderinae. The genus contains two species found in Australia. Froggattella kirbii is fairly common, while Froggattella latispina is known only from two locations in South Australia.

The two species range from small to medium in size, where they are found foraging in distinct trails on low vegetation or small sized trees.

== Species ==
- Froggattella kirbii (Lowne, 1865)
- Froggattella latispina Wheeler, 1936
