= Silver eel =

Conservation status
- Data Deficient (IUCN 3.1)

Scientific classification
- Kingdom: Animalia
- Phylum: Chordata
- Class: Actinopterygii
- Order: Anguilliformes
- Family: Congridae
- Genus: Ariosoma
- Species: A. mellissii

Binomial name
- Ariosoma mellissii (Günther, 1870)

Synonyms
- Congromuraena mellissii Günther, 1870; Ariosoma mellissi (Günther, 1870)

Species of fish

The silver eel (Ariosoma mellissii), also known as the Melliss's conger, is an eel in the family Congridae (conger/garden eels). It was described by Albert Günther in 1870. It is a rare tropical, marine eel which is known solely from St. Helena, in the southeastern Atlantic Ocean. It is known to dwell at a maximum depth of 67 meters. Males can reach a maximum total length of 42.8 centimetres.

Named in honor of John Charles Melliss (1835-1911), amateur naturalist and government surveyor on St. Helena (island in the South Atlantic), who presented the type specimen to the British Museum (Natural History).
