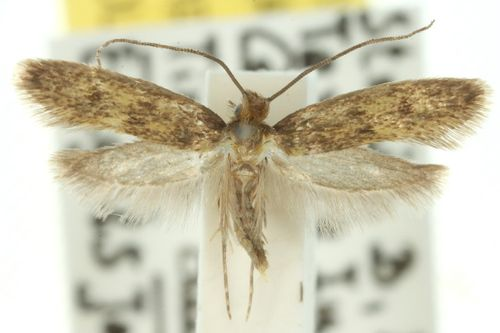

Scientific classification
- Kingdom: Animalia
- Phylum: Arthropoda
- Clade: Pancrustacea
- Class: Insecta
- Order: Lepidoptera
- Family: Tineidae
- Genus: Tinea
- Species: T. dubiella

Binomial name
- Tinea dubiella Stainton, 1859

= Tinea dubiella =

Species of moth

Tinea dubiella is a species of moth belonging to the family Tineidae.

It is native to Europe. This species has been recorded in New Zealand and is regarded as being established in that country.

== Description ==
Head with rust red hair.Forewing dark grey-brown with weak black spots, usually at least two and a hyaline spot near the base.Hindwings light grey. Difficult to distinguish from Tinea columbariella, Tinea pellionella and Tinea svenssoni but the genitalia are diagnostic.

== Biology ==
The moth flies at night from July–August. It is found indoors including in barns and stables. The larva is whitish with a reddish-brown head and feeds on wool, hides, furs, feathers, insect collections, etc.
