= John Charles Melliss =

British engineer and naturalist

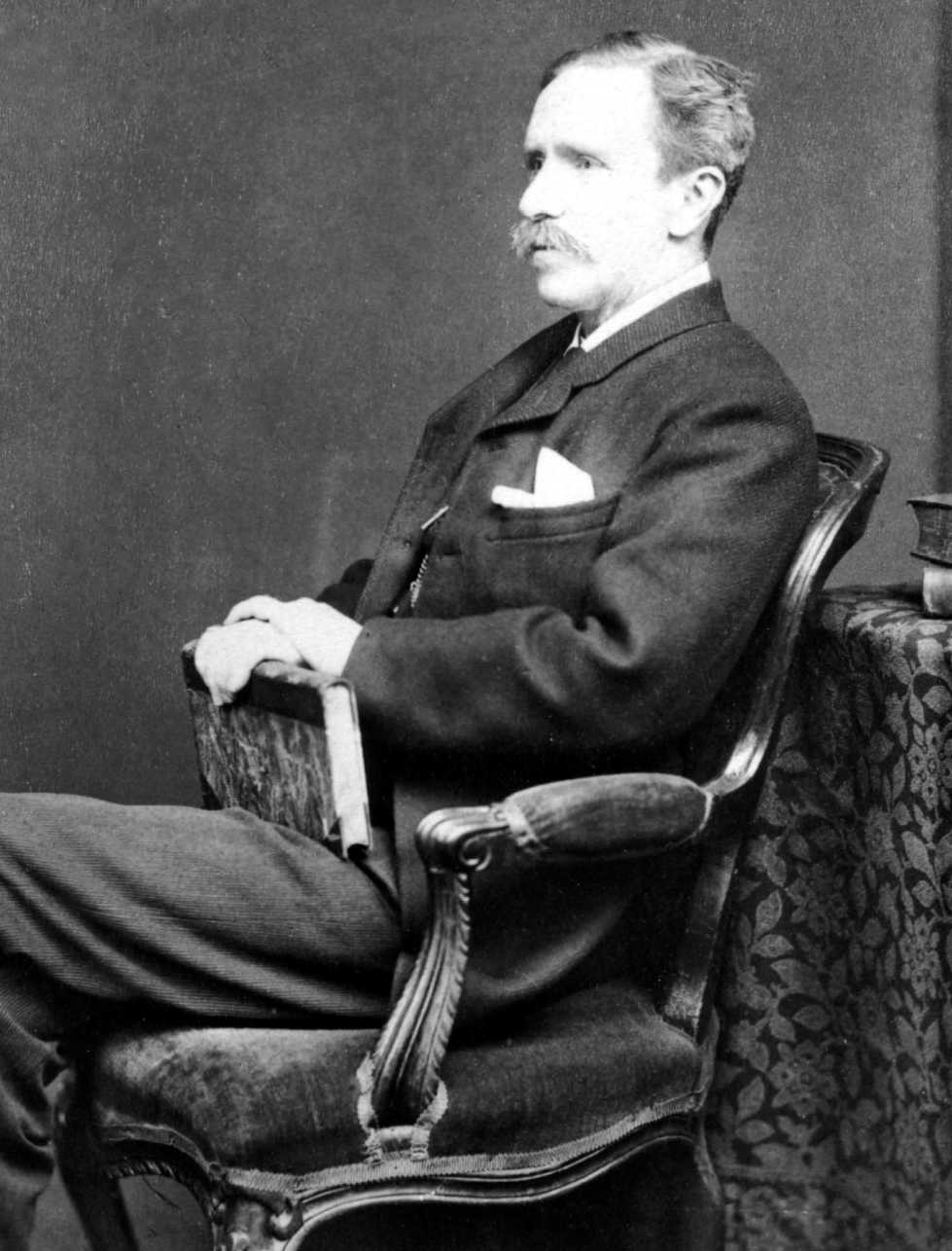

John Charles Melliss (23 January 1835 – 23 August 1910) was a British engineer and amateur naturalist. He lived in St. Helena and wrote a book on the geology, history and geography of the island in 1875. He also wrote on the natural history of the island. J.D. Hooker named the genus Mellissia in his honour.

== Biography ==
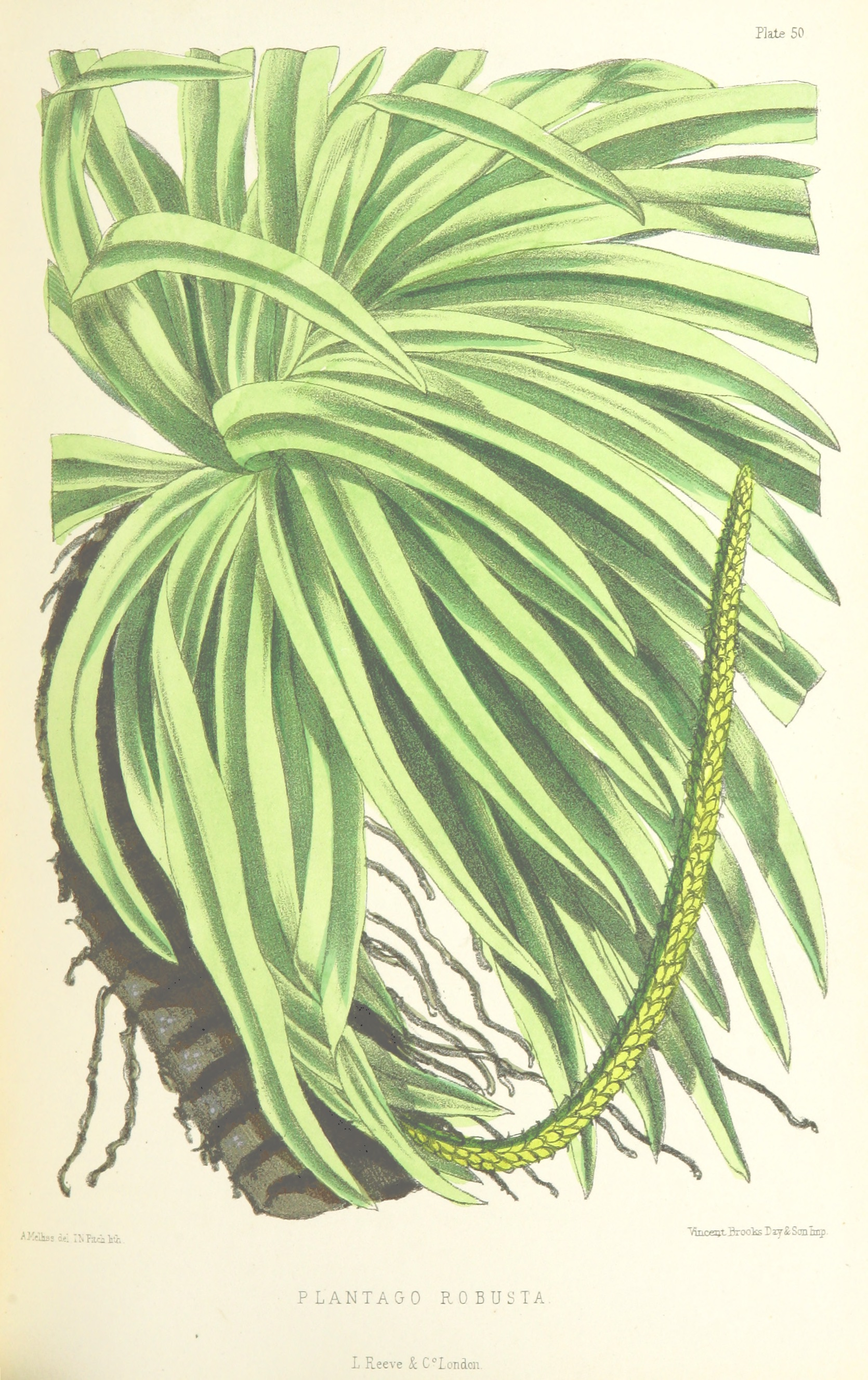
Plate depicting Plantago robusta, inscribed "A. Melliss del".

Melliss was born on the island of St Helena in the South Atlantic Ocean. His father, Captain W. J. Melliss, was an officer of the St Helena Artillery. After training as an engineer at King's College, and serving as an officer in the Royal Engineers, he was appointed successor to his father as Commissioner and Surveyor Engineer of St. Helena from 1860 to 1871. In 1870 he planned a tunnel through Mundens Hill connecting James Valley with Ruperts Valley but this never happened. In 1871, because of government cutbacks, he was made redundant and returned to London, where he subsequently formed the firm of J.C. Melliss and Co. He worked on the drainage of the Lower Thames Valley and the Coventry and Leyton sewage works.

In 1875, he published the book for which he is best known: St. Helena: A Physical, Historical and Topographical Description of the Island, Including the Geology, Fauna, Flora and Meteorology. It was illustrated by his wife, Alice Elizabeth Louisa Melliss, née Stace, who was credited on the title page as "Mrs. J. C. Melliss", and on plates as "A. Melliss".

To commemorate the book's centenary in 1975, the St. Helena Post Office published a set of four stamps, using illustrations from the book.

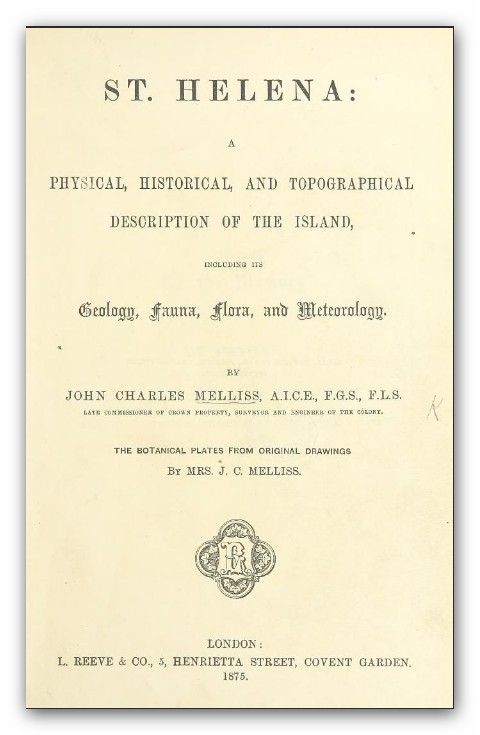
Title page

Melliss inspired Thomas Vernon Wollaston, a noted beetle specialist, to visit St Helena with his wife Edith in 1875-76. Wollaston studied the beetles in Coleoptera Sanctæ-Helenæ (1875) while his wife wrote an account of the moths of the island.

Melliss died at his Hampstead home on 23rd August 1910.

== Recognition ==
Joseph Dalton Hooker named the monotypic plant genus Mellissia in his honour for the plant Mellissia begoniifolia, the St Helena Boxwood. It was subsequently subsumed into the genus Withania.

The Silver Eel (Ariosoma mellissii), also known as the Melliss's Conger, was named for him by Albert Gunther.

== Family ==
The Melliss's son, Hugh John Melliss, born in 1880 joined his father's company (later named Melliss and Partners following a partnership with H.R. Smart). He worked for the company until 1955.
