= Henry Hope Reed Award =

Award for supporting city development

Initiated in 2005, the global Henry Hope Reed Award or short Reed Award is given to an individual working outside the practice of architecture who has supported the cultivation of the traditional city, its architecture and art through writing, planning or promotion. It is awarded in conjunction with the Driehaus Architecture Prize at the Notre Dame School of Architecture. It is named in honor of architecture critic Henry Hope Reed Jr.

The award winner receives a bronze medal showing a bas relief cameo of Reed, surrounded by laurel. It was custom designed by P.E. Guerin, the oldest decorative hardware firm in the United States.

The prize was first presented on March 19, 2005, at the University Club of Chicago, to Henry Hope Reed.

== Laureates ==
The list of laureates:

Year	Recipient	Country
2005	Henry Hope Reed	United States
2006	David Morton	United States
2007	Edward Perry Bass	United States
2008	Roger G. Kennedy	United States
2009	Fabio Grementieri	Argentina
2010	Vincent Scully	United States
2011	Robert A. Peck	United States
2012	Elizabeth Barlow Rogers	United States
2013	David Watkin	United Kingdom
2014	Ruan Yisan	China
2015	Richard J. Jackson	United States
2016	Eusebio Leal Spengler	Cuba
2017	James S. Ackerman	United States
2018	Torsten Kulke	Germany
2019	Carl Laubin	United Kingdom
2020	Clem Labine	United States
2021	John Reps	United States
2022	Wendell Berry	United States
2023	Adele Chatfield-Taylor	United States
2024	Maurice Cox	United States
2025	Philippe Rotthier	Belgium
2026	Philippe Villeneuve	France

The 2018 Reed Award was received by the chair of the Society for Rebuilding Dresden's New Market (GHND) in Germany, Torsten Kulke.

The 2020 Reed Award was given to Clem Labine, the creator of the Palladio Award, which recognizes excellence in traditional design, and the eponymous Clem Labine Award for creating more humane and beautiful environments.

The historian of US American urban planning John Reps is posthumously awarded the Reed Award in 2021, being known for his iconic book The Making of Urban America (1965) among other influential research groundwork.

== See also ==
- Richard H. Driehaus Prize
- Notre Dame School of Architecture
