= National trust =

Cultural heritage organisation

A national trust is an organisation dedicated to preserving the cultural heritage of a particular geographic region. Although the focus may vary by region, the principal goals are to ensure the preservation of historically significant items and conserve areas of natural beauty. They generally operate as private non-profit organisations.

The first such trust organisation, The Trustees of Reservations, originated in 1890 as a regional group serving the state of Massachusetts, USA. The first on a national level, the National Trust, was founded in England in 1895 and operates as a charitable organisation serving England, Wales and Northern Ireland. Others were later founded around the world.

In 2007 the International National Trusts Organisation was established at a gathering in New Delhi, India, with a mandate to support collaboration and best practices among national trusts and similar associations, with member organisations from over 50 countries.

== List ==
A partial list of national trusts and similar organisations:

- Acting for Future Generations (Senegal)
- Addis Woubet (Ethiopia)
- African Union of Conservationists (Uganda)
- Amenity 2000 Association Japan (Japan)
- An Taisce – The National Trust for Ireland (Ireland)
- Associação para a constituição da Fundação Nacional para a conservação do Património Português (Portugal)
- Badan Warisan Malaysia (Heritage of Malaysia Trust) (Malaysia)
- Bahamas National Trust (Bahamas)
- Barbados National Trust (Barbados)
- Bermuda National Trust (Bermuda)
- Calcutta Tercentenary Trust (India)
- Centre for Heritage Development in Africa (Kenya)
- Conservation Trust, South Africa (South Africa)
- Conservatoire du Littoral (France)
- Cross Cultural Foundation Uganda (Uganda)
- Czech National Trust o.p.s. (Czech Republic)
- Din l-Art Ħelwa (Malta)
- Environmental Friends Society (Bahrain)
- Europa Nostra (Europe)
- Falkland Islands Museum and National Trust (Falkland Islands)
- Faroe Islands National Trust
- Fiji National Trust (Fiji)
- Fondo Ambiente Italiano (Italy)
- Friends of Czech Heritage (Czech Republic)
- Gelderland Trust for Historic Houses and Natural Landscape (Netherlands)
- Grenada National Trust (Grenada)
- Haiti National Trust (Haiti)
- Herita (Belgium)
- Heritage Canada The National Trust/La Fiducie nationale (Canada)
  - The Land Conservancy of British Columbia (British Columbia, Canada)
  - National Trust for Land and Culture (B.C.) Society (British Columbia, Canada)
  - Ontario Heritage Trust (Ontario, Canada)
  - Tantramar Heritage Trust (New Brunswick and Nova Scotia, Canada)
- Heritage New Zealand (New Zealand)
- Hout Bay Heritage Trust/Cape of Good Hope Living Heritage (South Africa)
- Indian National Trust for Art and Cultural Heritage (India)
- Indian Trust for Rural Heritage and Development (India)
- Indonesian Heritage Trust (Indonesia)
- International Centre for the Roerichs (Russia)
- Japan National Trust (Japan)
- Korean National Trust for Cultural Heritage (South Korea)
- Malta Nature Trust (Malta)
- Manx National Trust (Isle of Man)
- Ministry of Cultural Heritage, Handicrafts and Tourism
- Montserrat National Trust (Montserrat)
- Society for the Preservation of Ancient Norwegian Monuments (Norway)
- National Centre for Heritage Trusteeship (Russia)
- National Nature Trust (Korea)
- National Trust Sri Lanka (Sri Lanka)
- National Trust for Historic Preservation (United States)
  - National Trust Community Investment Corporation (United States)
- National Trust for Jersey (Jersey)
- National Trust (England, Wales and Northern Ireland)
- National Trust for Scotland (Scotland)
- National Trust for the Cayman Islands (Cayman Islands)
- National Trust of Australia (Australia)
  - National Trust of Australia (Victoria) (Australia)
  - National Trust of Queensland (Australia)
  - National Trust of South Australia (Australia)
  - National Trust of Western Australia (Australia)
- National Trust of Fiji (Fiji)
- National Trust of Guernsey (Guernsey)
- National Trust of Guyana (Guyana)
- National Trust of Korea (South Korea)
- National Trust of Slovakia (Slovakia)
- National Trust of Trinidad and Tobago (Trinidad and Tobago)
- National Trust of Zimbabwe (Zimbabwe)
- Queen Elizabeth II National Trust (New Zealand)
- Ruan Yisan Heritage Foundation (China)
- Saint Helena National Trust (St Helena)
- Saint Lucia National Trust (St Lucia)
- Siam Society (Thailand)
- Sumatra Heritage Trust (Indonesia)
- TARA Trust for African Rock Art (Kenya)
- Taiwan Environmental Information Association (Taiwan)
- Taiwan National Trust (Taiwan)
- Tesouros de Galicia (Spain)
- The Trustees of Reservations (Massachusetts, USA)
- Union Rempart (France)
- Zanzibar Stone Town Heritage Society (Tanzania)
