= Dresden Transport Museum =

Coordinates: 51°3′7.45″N 13°44′22.21″E

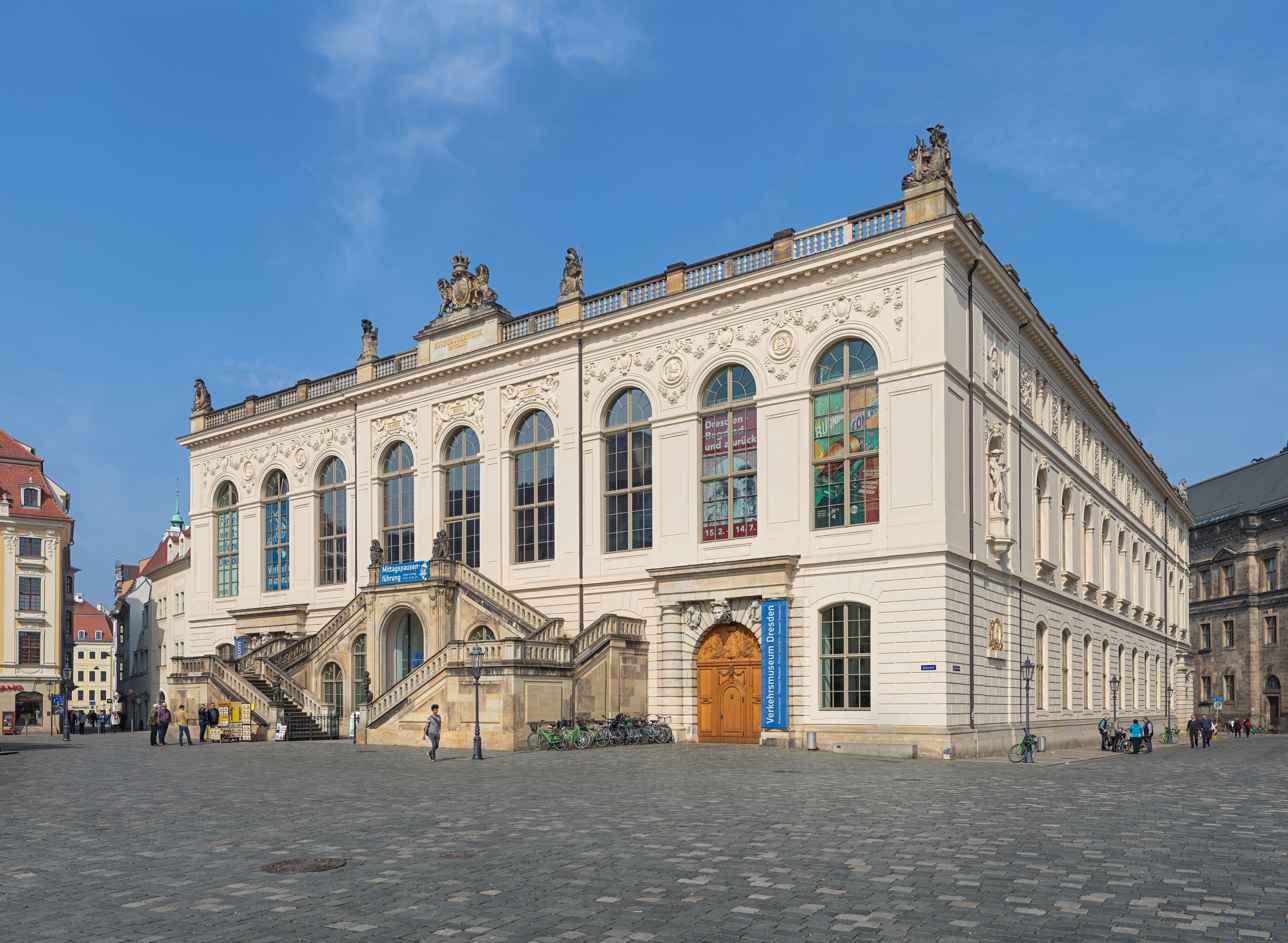
The Transport Museum is housed in the Johanneum at the Neumarkt

Dresden Transport Museum

The Dresden Transport Museum (German: Verkehrsmuseum Dresden) displays vehicles of all modes of transport, such as railway, shipping, road and air traffic, under one roof.

The museum is housed in the Johanneum at the Neumarkt in Dresden. The Johanneum was built between 1586 and 1590; it is one of the oldest museum buildings in Dresden.

== History ==
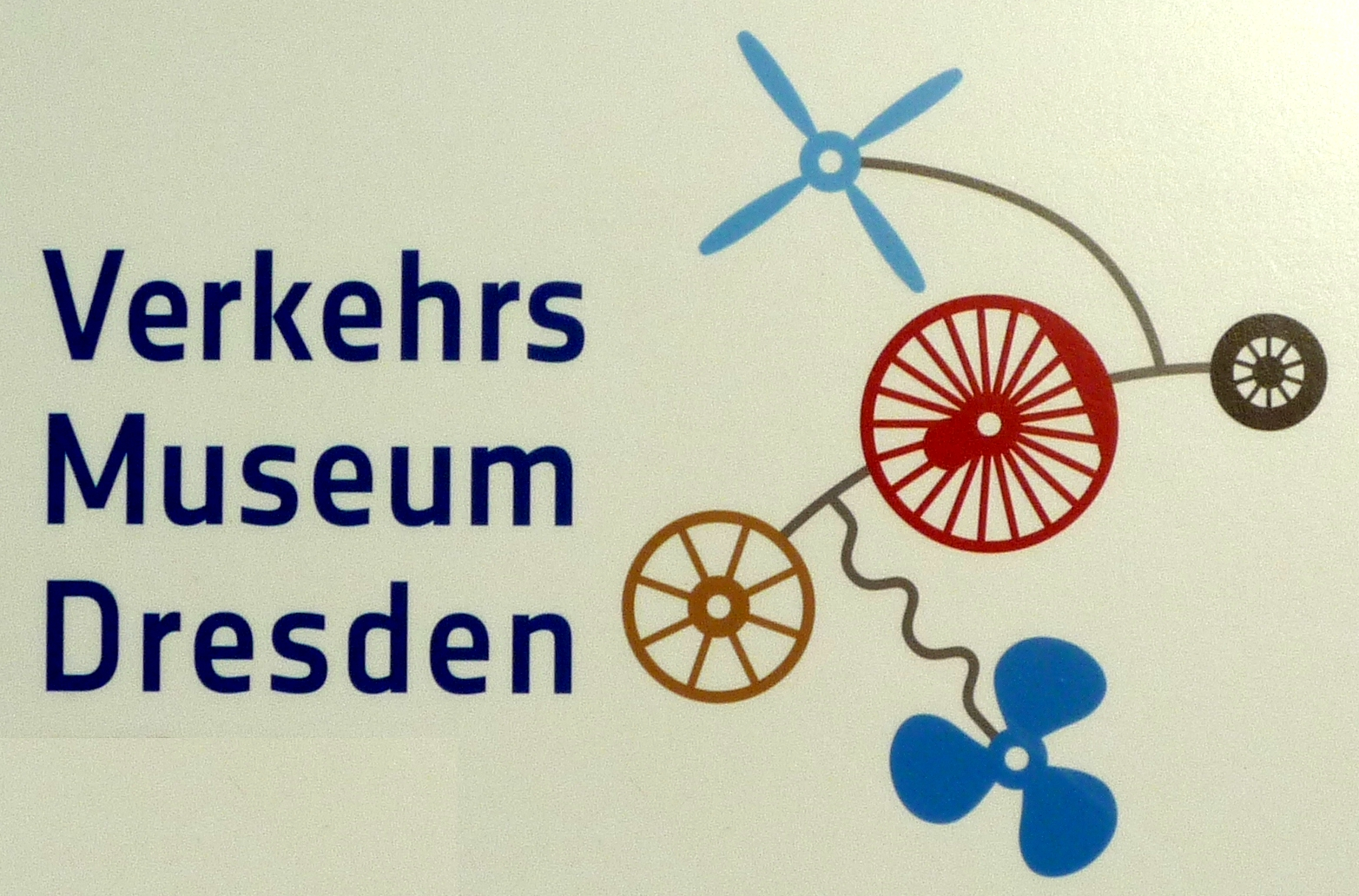

The history of the Dresden Transport Museum begins on 1 May 1952. On that day, negotiations started between the Hochschule für Verkehrswesen (High School for Transportation) and the Ministry of Transport for the construction of a transport museum in the German Democratic Republic. The museum was mainly intended to house the exhibits of the Saxon Railway Museum that had been evacuated during the Second World War. After Dresden was confirmed as the location, the first vehicles were stabled in a locomotive shed at Dresden's Neustadt station. Six employees began the development of the museum, and by 1953, two small exhibitions were on display. The actual opening in the then still badly damaged Johanneum took place in 1956. The first exhibition showed on the ground floor "120 years of Saxon Transport history." The first director was Elfriede Rehbein.

On 24 November 1958, the museum was transferred into the ownership of the Ministry of Transport. Renovation of the interior was completed in 1966, and the façade followed in 1968. The roof was not covered in copper, but in Duraluminium in keeping with aircraft construction techniques. Since the inauguration of the aviation exhibition in the 1970s, all means of transport, including railway, cars and bicycles, shipping, and air traffic, have been on display in the museum.

Because of the limited space in the Johanneum, not all the exhibits are based here. Numerous locomotives are stationed in the former Deutsche Reichsbahn locomotive depot (Betriebswerk or Bw) at Dresden-Altstadt. Furthermore, several vehicles have been loaned to other museums. The lack of space in the Johanneum prompted several discussions during the 1990s about moving the museum. However, the plan was not realized for financial reasons.

== Exhibition areas ==
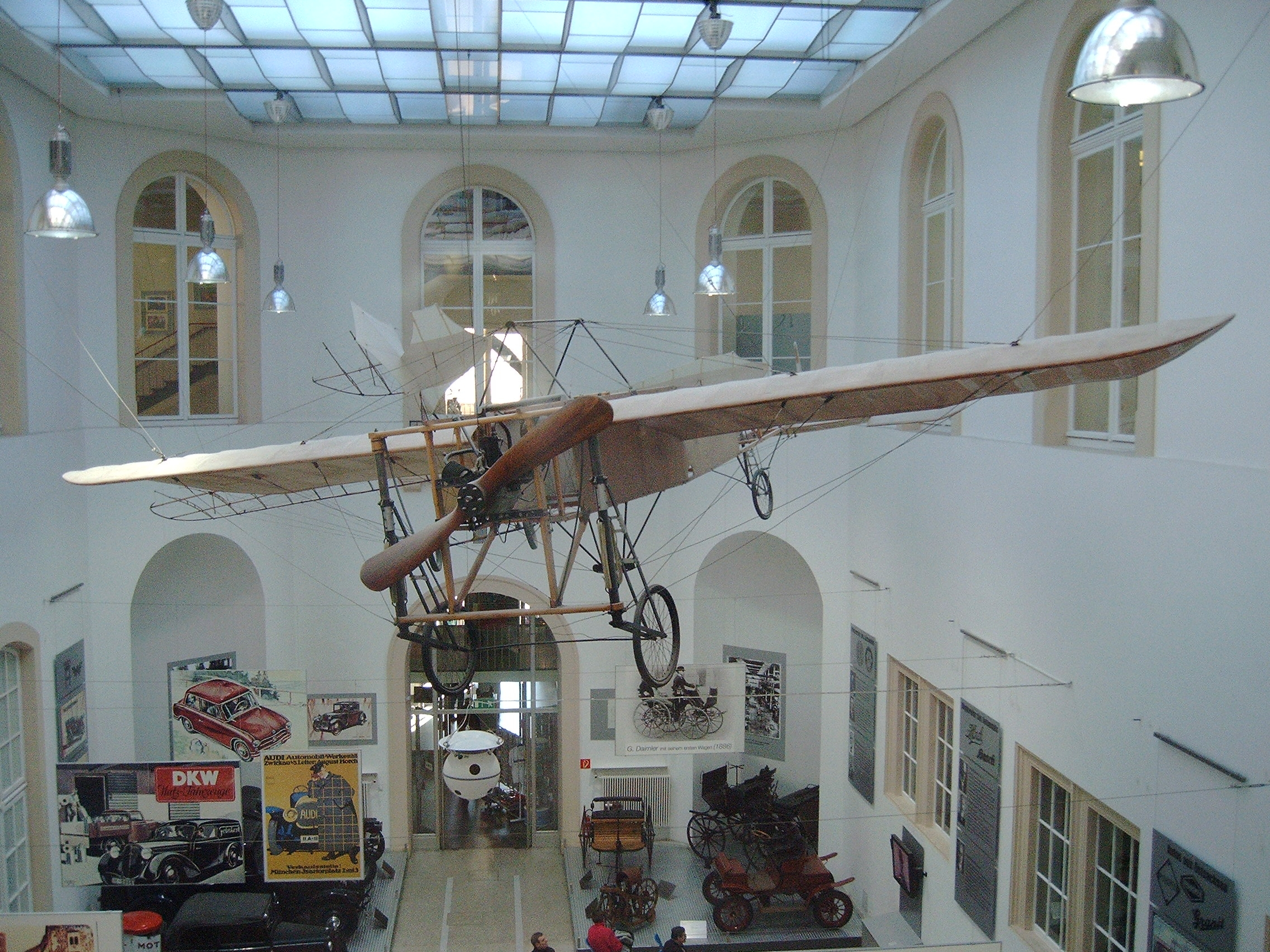
Historical aeroplane in the foyer

The museum is divided into the following exhibition areas:

- Railway
- Cars
- Trams - no longer displayed in the museum, transferred to Tram Museum Dresden e.V., Trachenberger Str. 38, 01129 Dresden
- Bicycles and motorbikes
- Air travel
- Sea travel

The German tourism website www.germany-tourism.de describes a visit to the museum as "like stepping into another world. Its unparalleled collection includes historical examples from pre-industrial eras, post-1850 vehicles, and unique exhibits with special historical significance - from delicate miniatures to colossal originals, such as the legendary Saxon "Muldenthal" locomotive (1861). A sedan chair dating from 1705, the museum's oldest exhibit, and a horse-drawn bus are milestones in the history of public transportation in Dresden. The museum also chronicles the history of aviation from the hot air balloon to the supersonic airliner."

The Dresden Transport Museum currently owns 116 different railway vehicles, of which only eight are on display in the Johanneum. A large number are kept at the depot or entrusted to other societies on loan. Examples include locomotive numbers 17 1055,19 017, 58 261, 24 004, V 15 1001, V 240 001, 120 338 and 130 002 as well as a catenary inspection railbus.

The road traffic exhibition displays Germany's pioneer automobiles, including a replica of Carl Benz's legendary tricycle of 1886, the predecessor of modern cars. The motorcycle exhibition shows, among others, a petroleum-powered Reitwagen ("riding car") motorcycle built by Gottlieb Daimler in 1885, the first internal combustion motorcycle.

The air traffic area provides visitors with a general overview of the development of civil aviation, with one focus being the Saxon contribution to it, particularly during the period from 1955 to 1961. The inauguration of our new permanent aviation exhibition is scheduled for 5 May 2012, the 60th anniversary of the Dresden Transport Museum.

The sea travel exhibition focuses on inland navigation on the Elbe river and maritime navigation on high seas. It also gives an overview of the past and present of sea travel.

== Gallery ==
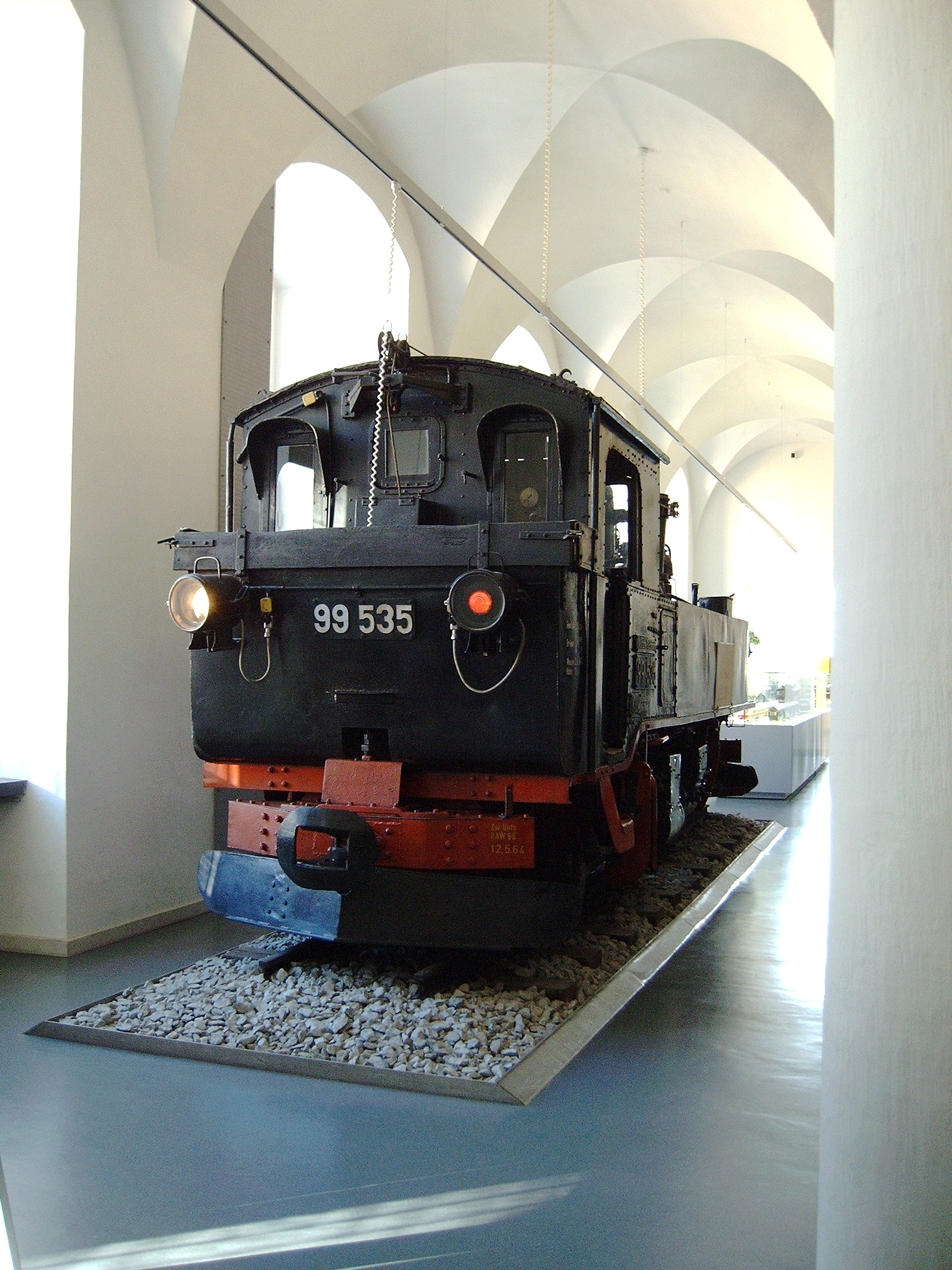
Saxon locomotive, class IV K in the railway section

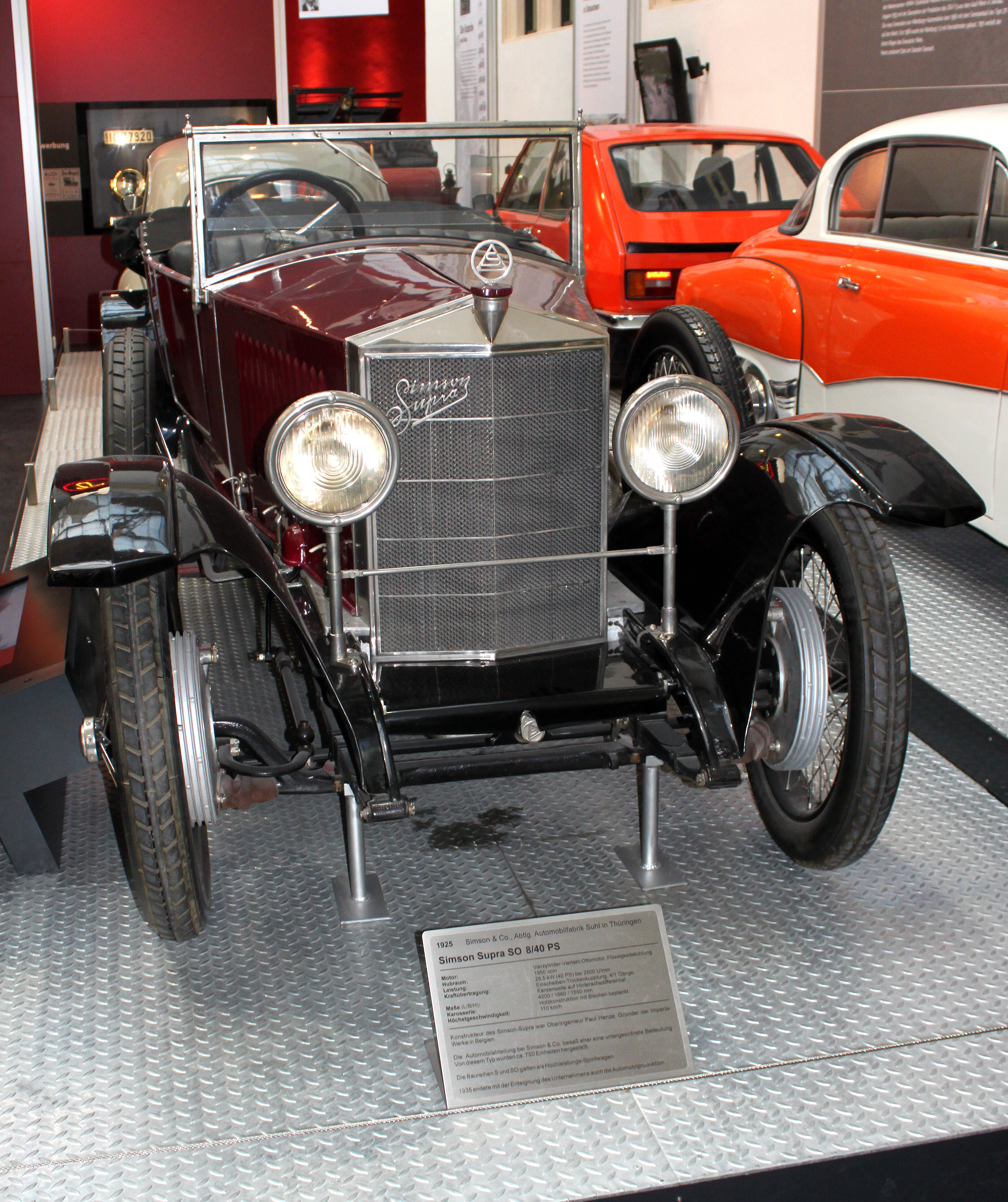
Historic cars

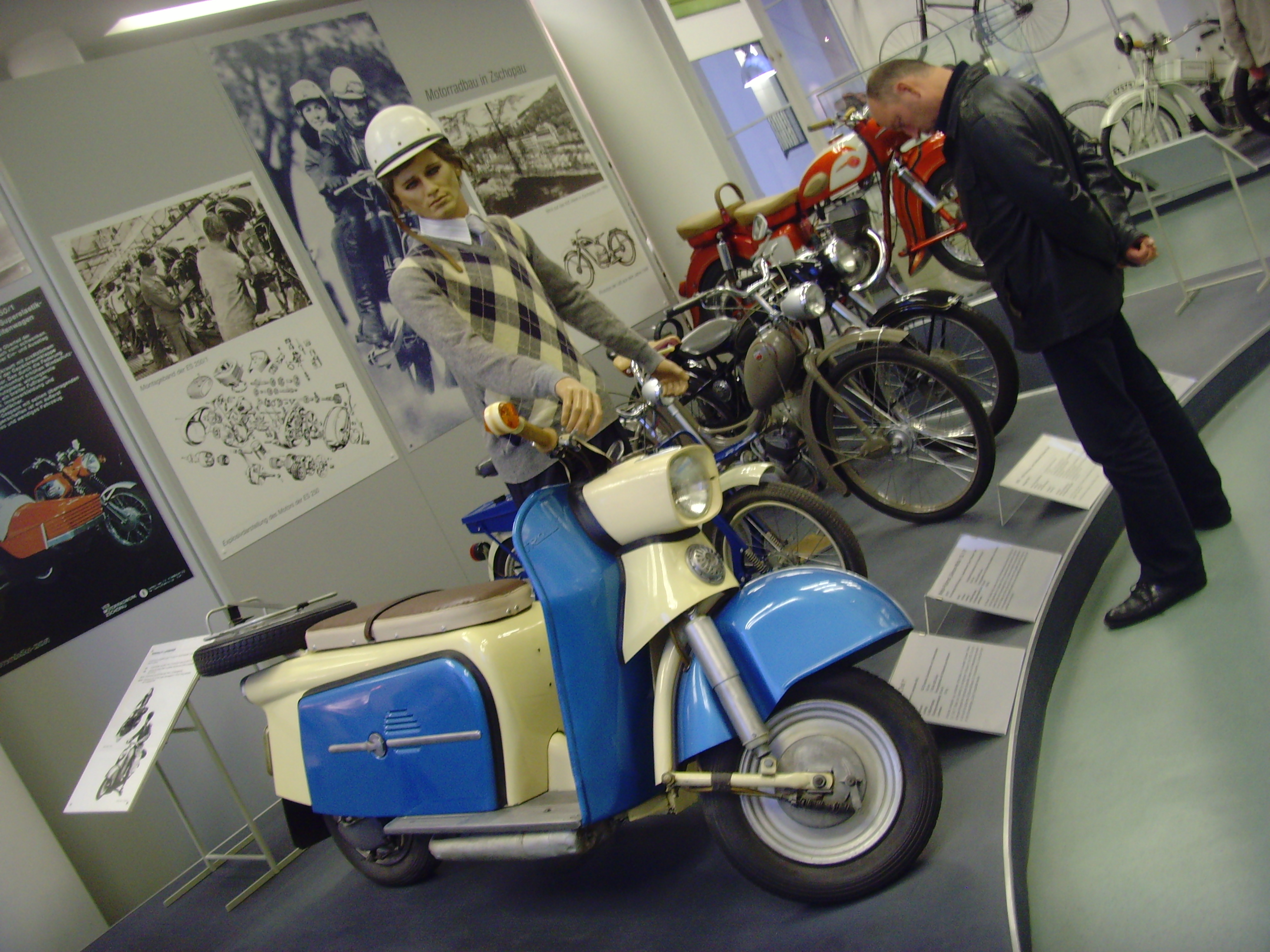
Motorcycles

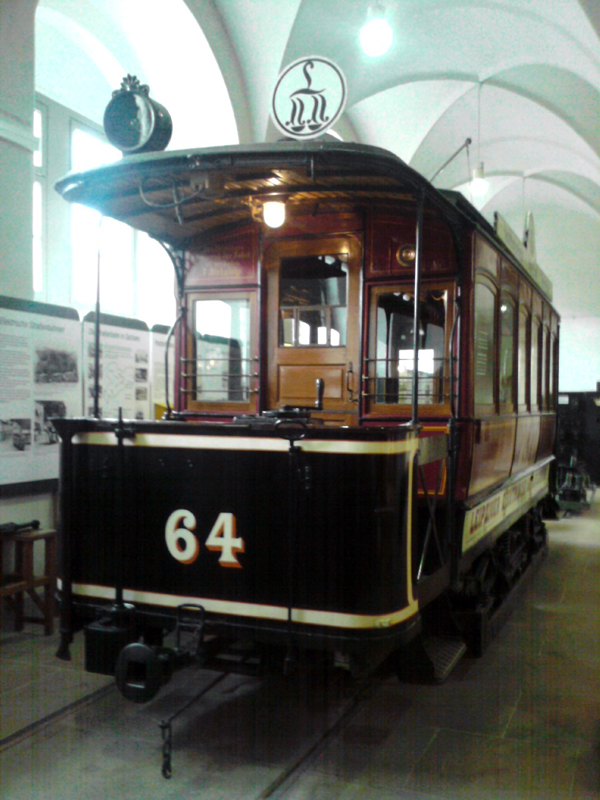
Historic tram "Berolina"

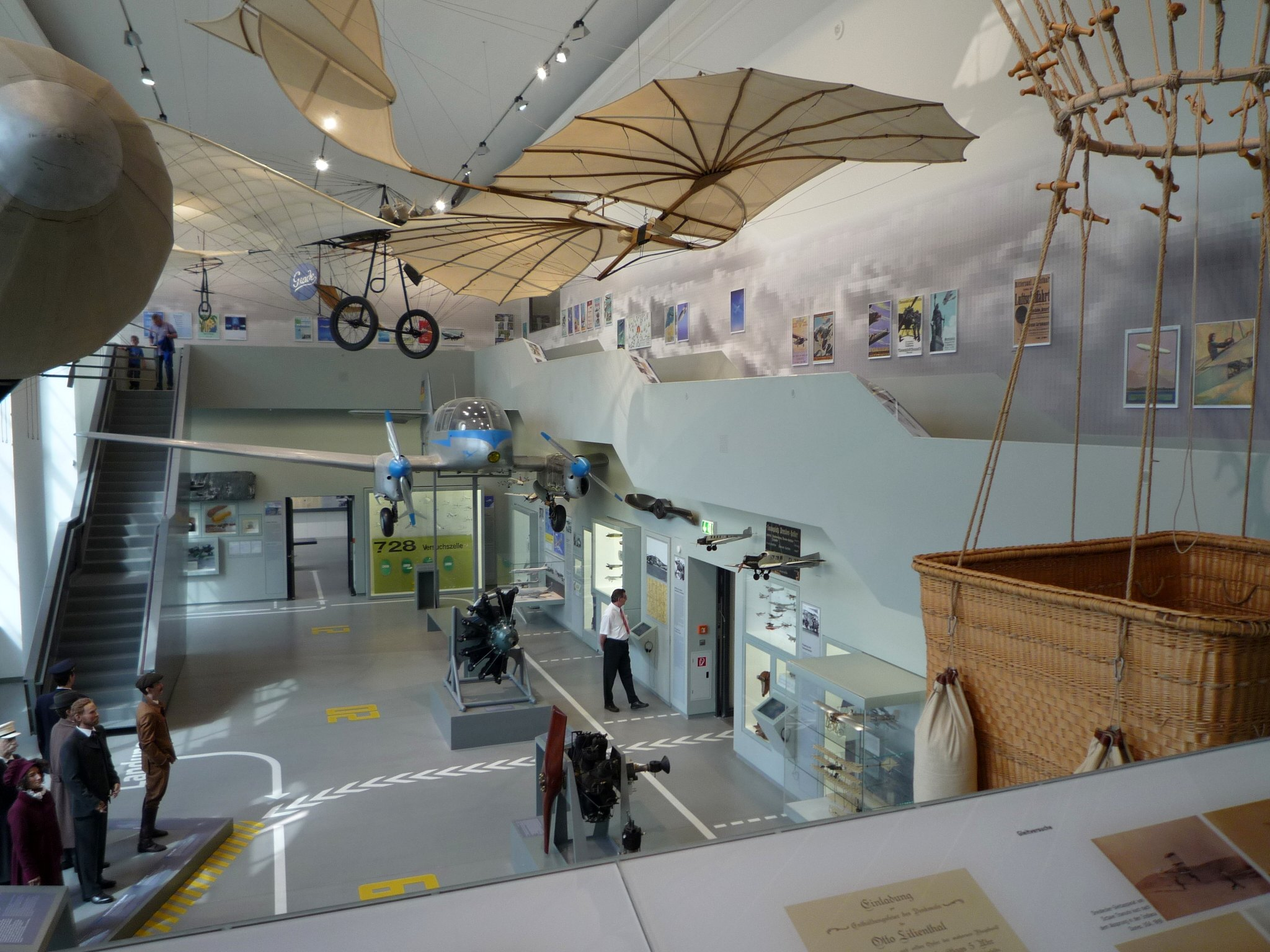
Aviation department

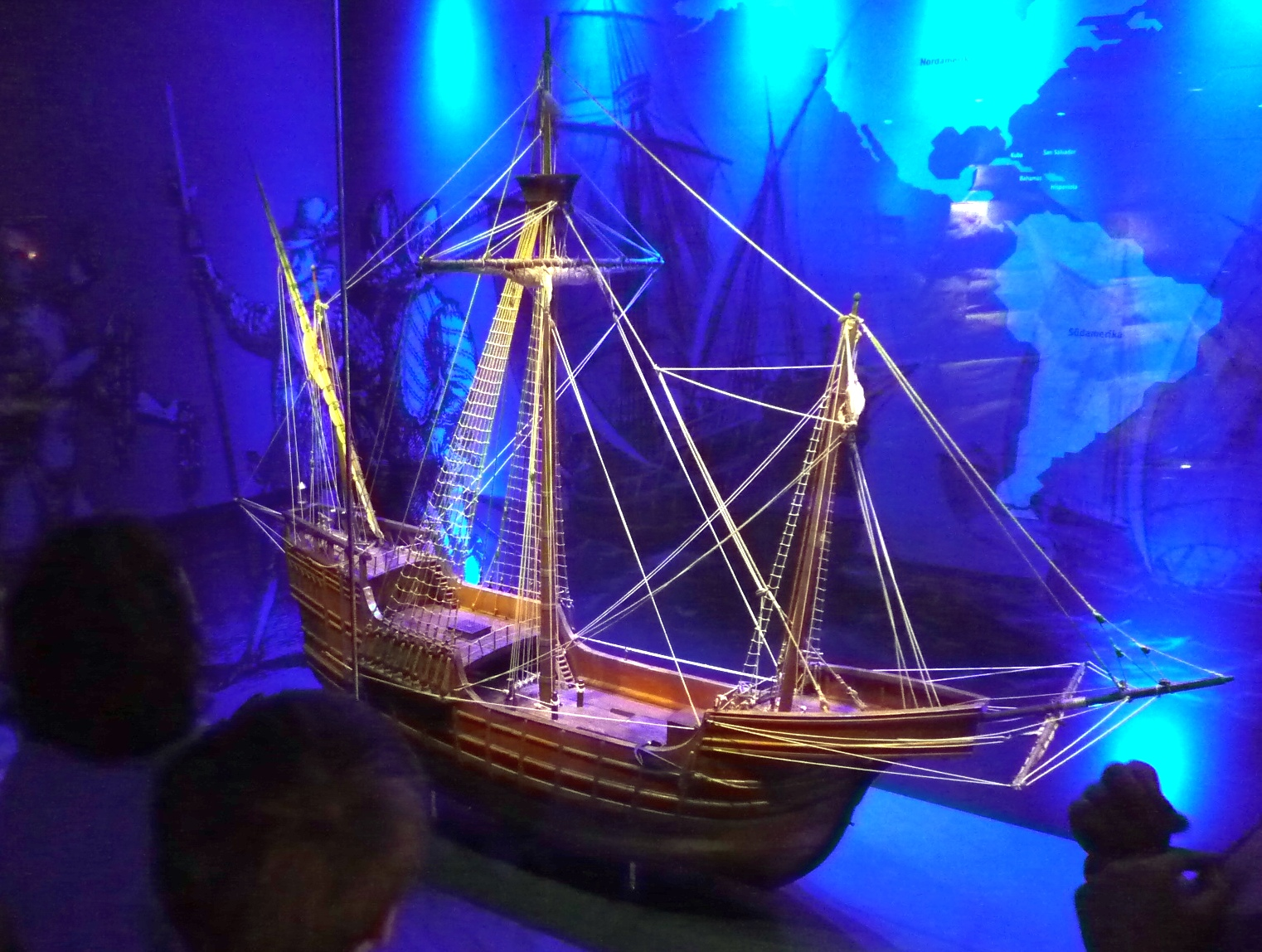
Replica of a historic sailing boat

== See also ==
- List of museums in Saxony
