= South Atlantic Invasive Species Project =

EU invasive species project

The South Atlantic Invasive Species Project (SAISP) was a three-year project (December 2006 - December 2009) funded under the European Union EDF 9. Its aim was to increase the capacity of the UK's South Atlantic Overseas Territories to deal with invasive species issues. The territories involved were Saint Helena, Tristan da Cunha, South Georgia and the South Sandwich Islands, the Falkland Islands and Ascension Island. The project was managed by the Royal Society for the Protection of Birds (RSPB) on behalf of the partner governments. In addition to the partner governments, two NGOs: Falklands Conservation and the Saint Helena National Trust were key stakeholders. It was also supported by the Royal Botanic Gardens, Kew.

== Project activities ==
The project started with the appointment of two project officers, Andrew Darlow, for Saint Helena, Ascension and Tristan da Cunha, and Brian Summers for the Falkland Islands, South Georgia and South Sandwich Islands. The focus of the project varied across the territories, depending on their needs.

During the course of the project, Dr Phil Lambdon discovered a living example of a type of sedge on Saint Helena, Bulbostylis neglecta, that had not been seen for over 200 years and was previously feared extinct.

Clare Miller who managed the South Atlantic Invasive Species project said:

Saint Helena’s wildlife has been ravaged by species introduced to the island. Goats, gorse, grasses, and cage birds have all been liberated on the island where they have wreaked havoc with the native species. Saint Helena is a noted extinction hotspot, driven largely by non-native species, and the native birds have suffered more here than many other islands. Of eight species of bird confined to the island, seven have become extinct since the island’s discovery in 1502.

The project involved surveys to identify and map naturalised and cultivated taxa, as well as risk assessment of introduced species and targeted control of some species.

A survey conducted in 2009 by Jo Osborne, Renata Borosova, Marie Briggs and Stuart Cable recorded 24 introduced vascular plant species on South Georgia. A report on the survey recommended the eradication of 20 out of 24 of these species. The report also recommended further survey to map the extent of the populations of these invasive species to determine the possibility of eradicating them, as well as regular monitoring of vegetation. As a result, a programme was conducted to eradicate wavy bittercress.

In addition to the survey conducted on South Georgia, botanical surveys were completed on Ascension Island, Tristan da Cunha, and Saint Helena. The SAIS Botanical Survey Report produced from the project summarised the state of plant invasions on Saint Helena and highlighted management issues, with suggestions for future actions.

On the Falkland Islands, island surveys, fox surveys, and garden plant surveys were conducted. Following the findings of these surveys, support for working towards rat and fox eradication on islands was provided. The island surveys discovered new populations of Cobb's wren, an endemic species of bird.

== Implications ==
In 2010, a South Atlantic Invasive Species Strategy and Action Plan was developed from the project findings. The aim of this was to encourage continuation of work after the project was completed and to act as the basis of a regional approach to invasive alien species. To implement the key actions of this plan successfully, a workshop was held on Ascension Island. The project also resulted in reviews of legislation related to invasive species for each Territory.

Since the completion of the South Atlantic Invasive Species Project in 2009, multiple projects have been carried out with similar aims to address invasive species in the region. For example, in 2011, the department for the Environment, Food, and Rural Affairs initiated a series of projects to address invasive species.
