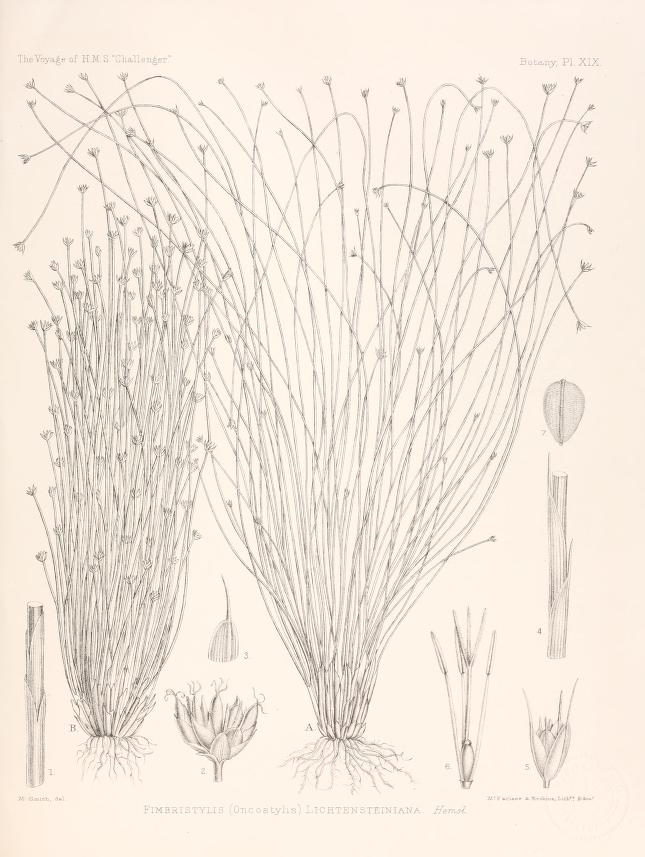

Conservation status
- Least Concern (IUCN 3.1)

Scientific classification
- Kingdom: Plantae
- Clade: Embryophytes
- Clade: Tracheophytes
- Clade: Spermatophytes
- Clade: Angiosperms
- Clade: Monocots
- Clade: Commelinids
- Order: Poales
- Family: Cyperaceae
- Genus: Bulbostylis
- Species: B. lichtensteiniana

Binomial name
- Bulbostylis lichtensteiniana (Kunth) C.B. Clarke, 1837

Synonyms
- Fimbristylis lichtensteiniana (Kunth) Hemsl.; Isolepis lichtensteiniana Kunth; Scirpus lichtensteinianus (Kunth) Boeckeler

= Bulbostylis lichtensteiniana =

Tussock sedge

Species of flowering plant in the sedge family

Bulbostylis lichtensteiniana is a species of flowering plant in the sedge family, Cyperaceae, that is endemic to Saint Helena. Unlike other species native to Saint Helena, such as Bulbostylis neglecta, Bulbostylis lichtensteiniana does not show obvious signs of decline due to the spread of invasive plants. However, the lack of decline is partially attributed to Bulbostylis lichtensteiniana being the only endemic plant to have expanded into new anthropogenic habitats.
