= A History of Western Architecture =

1986 textbook by David Watkin

- Author: David Watkin
- Language: English
- Subject: History of architecture
- Genre: Textbook
- Published: 1986 (original); 2023 (7th ed.)
- Publisher: Thames & Hudson (original), Laurence King Publishing (7th ed., 2022)
- Pages: 591 (original); 752 (7th ed.)
- ISBN: 978-1529420302

A History of Western Architecture is a textbook by British architectural historian David Watkin, first published in 1986. The seventh edition (2023) was revised and expanded by Owen Hopkins. The book is known for emphasising the classical tradition's importance for later architecture.

== Contents ==
As of the fourth edition (2005), the book has 11 chapters:

- Mesopotamia and Egypt
- The Classical Foundation: Greek, Hellenistic, Roman
- Early Christian and Byzantine
- Carolingian and Romanesque
- The Gothic Experiment
- Renaissance Harmony
- Baroque Expansion
- Eighteenth-Century Classicism
- The Nineteenth Century
- Art Nouveau
- The Twentieth Century and Beyond

== Publication ==
Seven editions have been published as of 2024. The seventh was revised and expanded in 2023 following Watkin's death in 2018 by Owen Hopkins, another British architectural historian. By then, a chapter on 21st-century architecture had split off the 20th-century one. Translations have been published in multiple languages such as Dutch.

== Reception ==
By the 2000s, Watkin's textbook became widely used in architectural schools in the Netherlands and Belgium for the standard introductory survey course on the history of Western architecture. In a 2002 article, architectural historians Hilde Heynen and Krista de Jonge noted that the textbook's use along with a few other standard ones promoted a standardization of the taught architectural canon of a small set of buildings that illustrated recognized periods of architectural history. At the same time, these schools were trying to move away from a standard canon.

British art historian Deborah Howard recommended A History of Western Architecture as a survey reference textbook in 2002.

== Bibliography ==
- Clement, Russell T. (August 1, 2011). "Watkin, David. A History of Western Architecture". Library Journal. 136 (13): 92.
- Goss, Peter L. (1988). "Review: A History of Western Architecture by David Watkin". Journal of the Society of Architectural Historians. 47 (1): 79–80. doi:10.2307/990261. JSTOR 990261.
- Heynen, Hilde; de Jonge, Krista (September 2002). "The Teaching of Architectural History and Theory in Belgium and the Netherlands". Journal of the Society of Architectural Historians. 61 (3): 335–345. doi:10.2307/991787. JSTOR 991787.
- Howard, Deborah (September 2002). "Teaching Architectural History in Great Britain and Australia: Local Conditions and Global Perspectives". Journal of the Society of Architectural Historians. 61 (3): 346–354. doi:10.2307/991788. JSTOR 991788.
- Watkin, David (2005). A History of Western Architecture (4th ed.). London: Laurence King Publishing. ISBN 978-1-85669-459-9.
