= B. neglecta =

B. neglecta may refer to:

- Bothrops neglecta, a synonym for Bothrops pirajai, the Piraja's lancehead, a venomous pitviper species found in Brazil
- Bulbostylis neglecta, the neglected tuft sedge, a plant species endemic to Saint Helena in the South Atlantic

== See also ==
- Neglecta (disambiguation)
