= Bulbostylis eleocharoides =

Scientific classification
- Kingdom: Plantae
- Clade: Tracheophytes
- Clade: Angiosperms
- Clade: Monocots
- Clade: Commelinids
- Order: Poales
- Family: Cyperaceae
- Genus: Bulbostylis
- Species: B. eleocharoides

Binomial name
- Bulbostylis eleocharoides Kral & M.T.Strong

Species of plant

Bulbostylis eleocharoides is a species of plant in the family Cyperaceae first described by Robert Kral and Mark T. Strong. Its native range is Bolivia to Paraguay. No subspecies are listed in the Catalogue of Life.
