= Johanneum =

Coordinates: 51°3′7.45″N 13°44′22.21″E

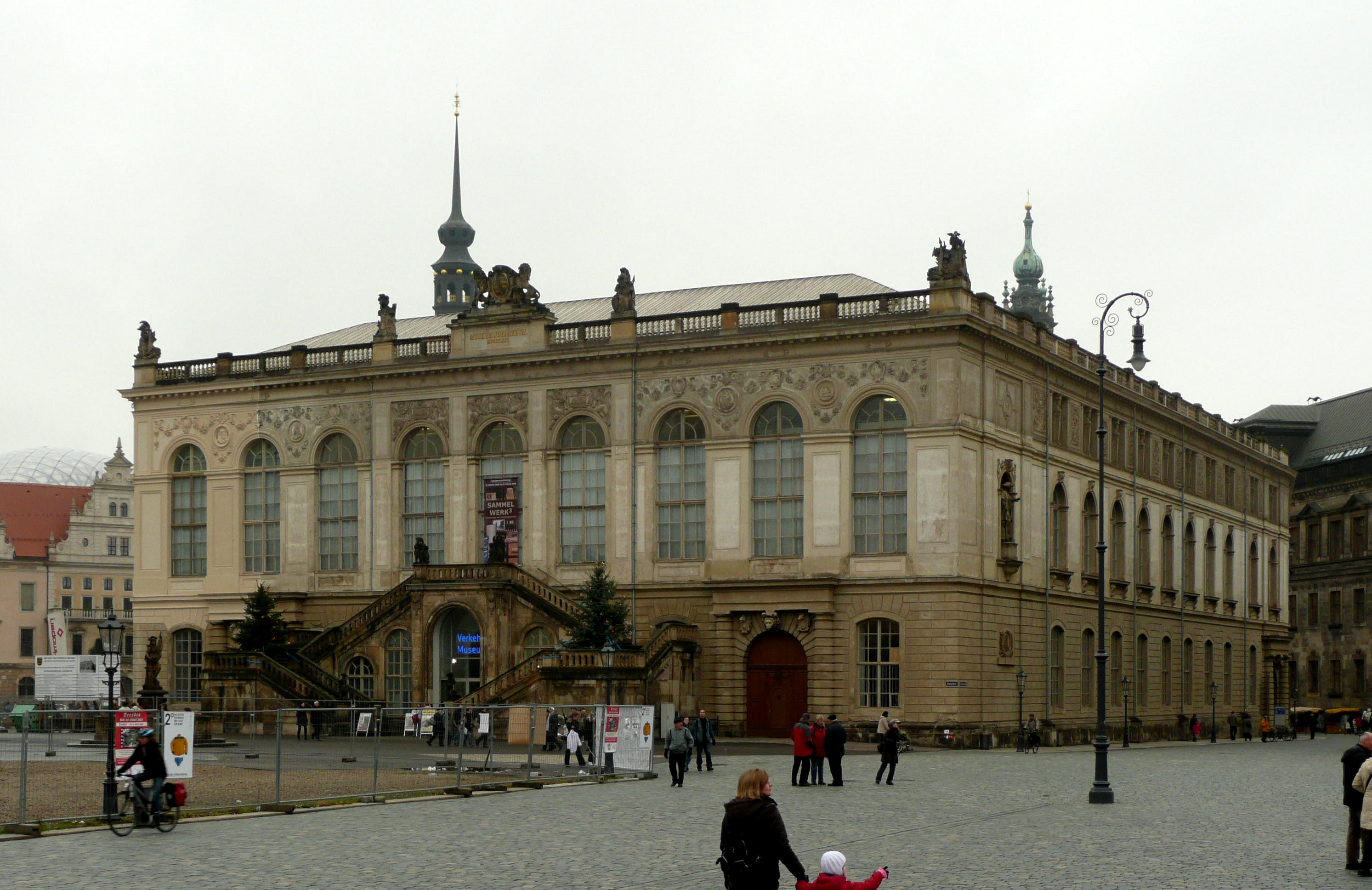
The Johanneum at the Neumarkt

The Johanneum is a Renaissance building, originally designated as Stallgebäude mit Harnischkammer because it was constructed as the elite part of the electoral mews. It was the first museum of modern times built in 1586-1588 and is located at the Neumarkt in Dresden.

Today the Johanneum is home to the Dresden Transport Museum (Verkehrsmuseum Dresden), which displays vehicles of all modes of transport and their history.

== History ==
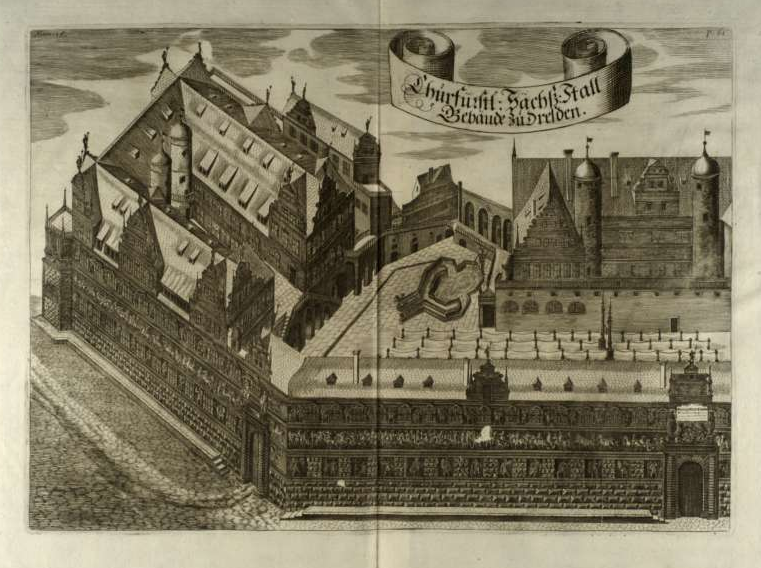
Dresden Stable building and courtyard, ca. 1680, A. Weck

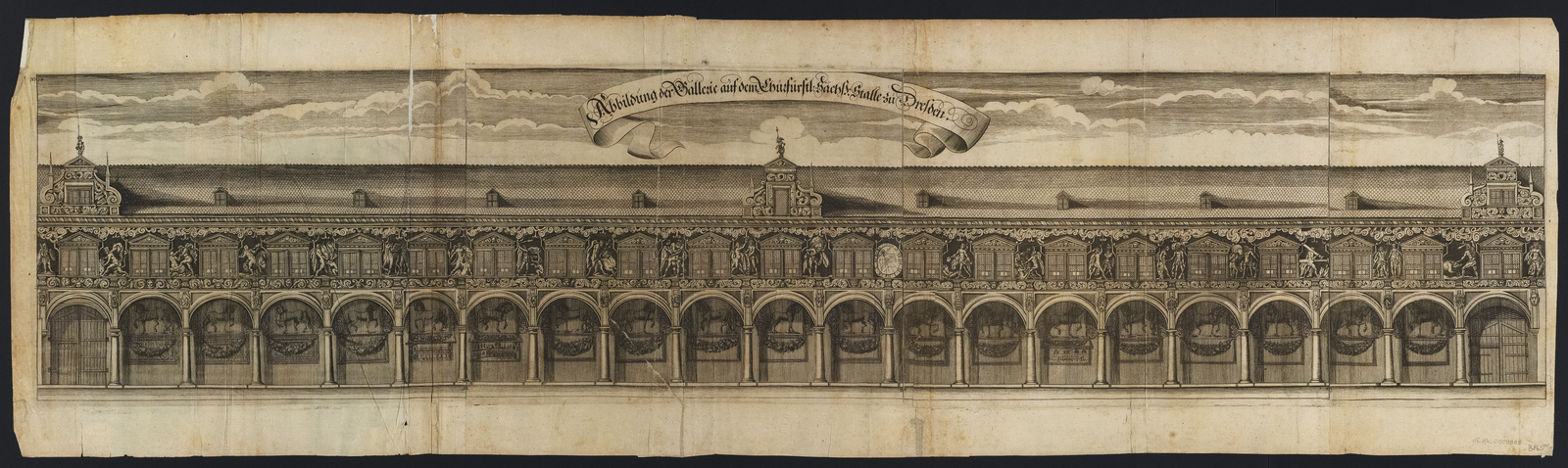
Dresden Long corridor on its courtyard side, ca. 1680, A. Weck. The arcades showed horse paintings, possibly after Tempesta.

The Johanneum was built between 1586 and 1590 as Stallgebäude mit Harnischkammer, the elite stables of the adjacent Dresden Castle.

The two halls on the building's ground floor provided space for 128 expensive riding-art horses imported in part from Italy. The stands for the horses were decorated with spectacular horse-paintings, modeled after the Sala dei cavalli in Mantua's Palazzo Té.

In the stable, that was designed as a princely exhibition of elite horses, 35 rooms were lavishly decorated to contain horse and rider figurines, elaborate sleighs as well as an expensive arms collection of the Saxon Electors. Later also stuffed horses, a stuffed bear and wax figurines of the electors were exhibited. One of the exhibited horses, the Merseburger, became famous for its 8 m long mane.

The upper floors were designed as collection rooms for the vast collection of princely armoury, wardrobe and utensils for pageants of the Dresden court. The Renaissance-era building was designed as the first public museum and designed by Paul Buchner on behalf of Prince Elector Christian I of Saxony.

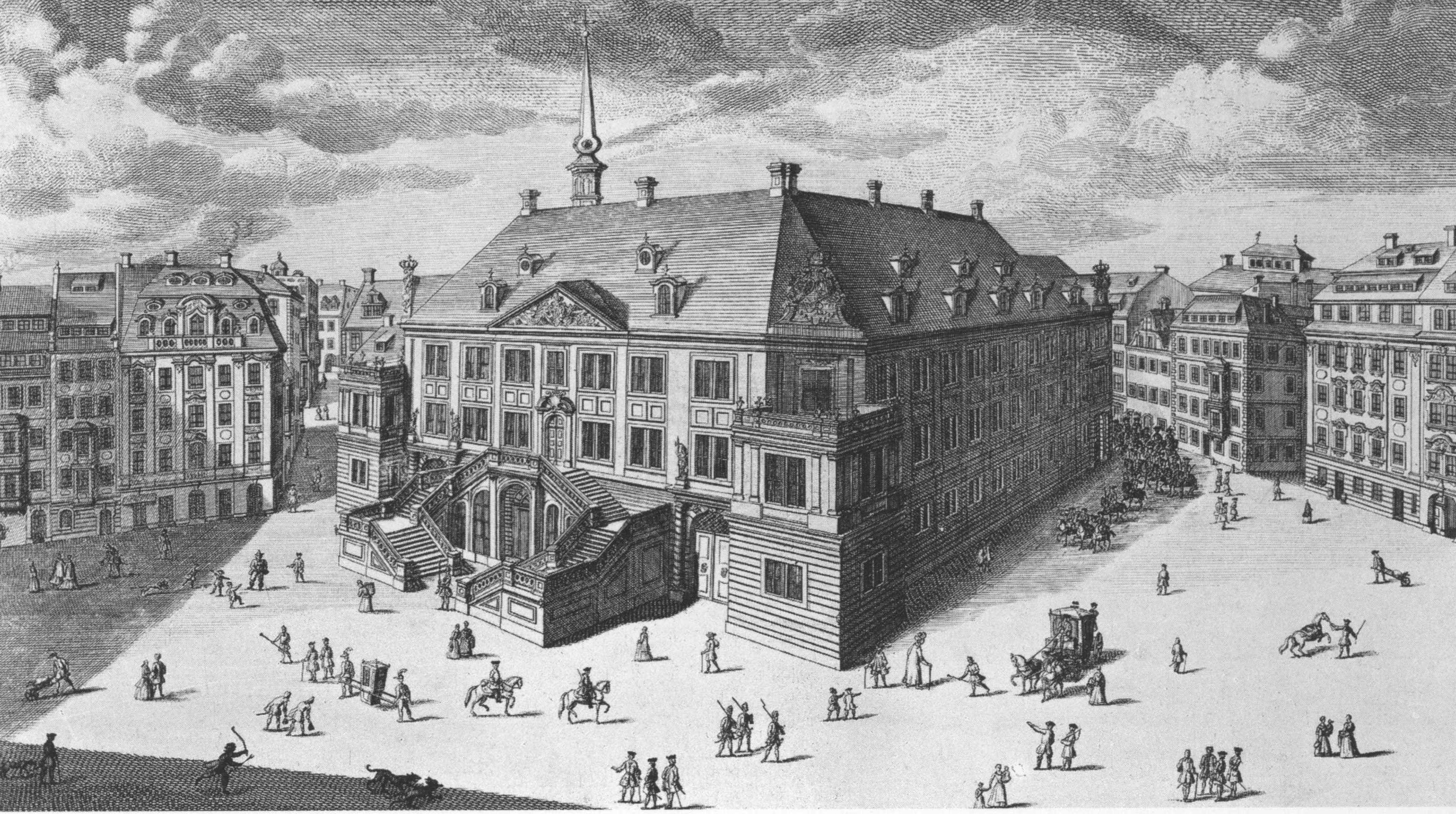
The Stallgebäude after its extension with an upper floor and a staircase in 1731

The upper floor was later changed in 1730 and 1731, when on Augustus II the Strong's request, the building was converted into a guest house and later into a painting gallery. The double-flight staircase was added in 1731. The royal painting collection was moved from the Dresden Castle to the Stallgebäude in 1747 and remained there until 1855.

After another building alteration between 1872 and 1876, the Stallgebäude was renamed the Johanneum, after the Saxonian King John (Johann in German). The Dresden Porcelain Collection was moved into the Johanneum in 1876, followed in 1877 by the Dresden Armory collection.

The building was severely damaged during the February 13, 1945 bombing of Dresden in World War II. Its reconstruction began in 1950, and the renovation of the facade was finished in 1960. Since this reconstruction, the Johanneum has been home to the Dresden Transport Museum.
