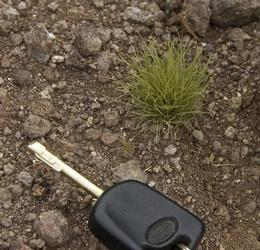
- Bulbostylis neglecta

Scientific classification
- Kingdom: Plantae
- Clade: Tracheophytes
- Clade: Angiosperms
- Clade: Monocots
- Clade: Commelinids
- Order: Poales
- Family: Cyperaceae
- Genus: Bulbostylis; Kunth

Type species
- Bulbostylis capillaris (L.) Kunth ex C.B. Clarke.

Species
- 100+; See text

Synonyms
- Stenophyllus Raf.; Oncostylis Nees

= Bulbostylis =

Hairsedges

Genus of grass-like plants

Bulbostylis is a genus of plants in the sedge family. They are sometimes called hairsedges. There are over 200 species of these clump-forming plants of dry grasslands and warm and tropical savannas worldwide. They have solid, rounded, grooved stems and long, thin basal leaves. They bear spikelets of flowers.

Selected species:

- Bulbostylis barbata - watergrass
- Bulbostylis bathiei
- Bulbostylis boeckleriana
- Bulbostylis burbidgeae
- Bulbostylis cangae
- Bulbostylis capillaris - densetuft hairsedge
- Bulbostylis ciliatifolia - capillary hairsedge
- Bulbostylis cioniana (Savi) Lye
- Bulbostylis coleotricha
- Bulbostylis curassavica - West Indian hairsedge
- Bulbostylis eleocharoides
- Bulbostylis fasciculata
- Bulbostylis fluviatilis
- Bulbostylis funckii - Funck's hairsedge
- Bulbostylis haitiensis
- Bulbostylis hispidula
- Bulbostylis junciformis - Caribbean hairsedge
- Bulbostylis juncoides - rush hairsedge
- Bulbostylis lichtensteiniana - tussock sedge
- Bulbostylis neglecta - neglected tuftsedge
- Bulbostylis pauciflora - fewflower hairsedge
- Bulbostylis schaffneri - Schaffner's hairsedge
- Bulbostylis stenophylla - sandy field hairsedge
- Bulbostylis turbinata
- Bulbostylis vestita - tufted hairsedge
- Bulbostylis warei - Ware's hairsedge
