= Bulbostylis fasciculata =

Scientific classification
- Kingdom: Plantae
- Clade: Tracheophytes
- Clade: Angiosperms
- Clade: Monocots
- Clade: Commelinids
- Order: Poales
- Family: Cyperaceae
- Genus: Bulbostylis
- Species: B. fasciculata

Binomial name
- Bulbostylis fasciculata Uittien

Species of grass-like plant

Bulbostylis fasciculata is a species of plant in the family Cyperaceae first described by Hendrik Uittien. It is found in South America. No subspecies are listed in the Catalogue of Life.
