= Dresden Historical Neumarkt Society =

German voluntary association

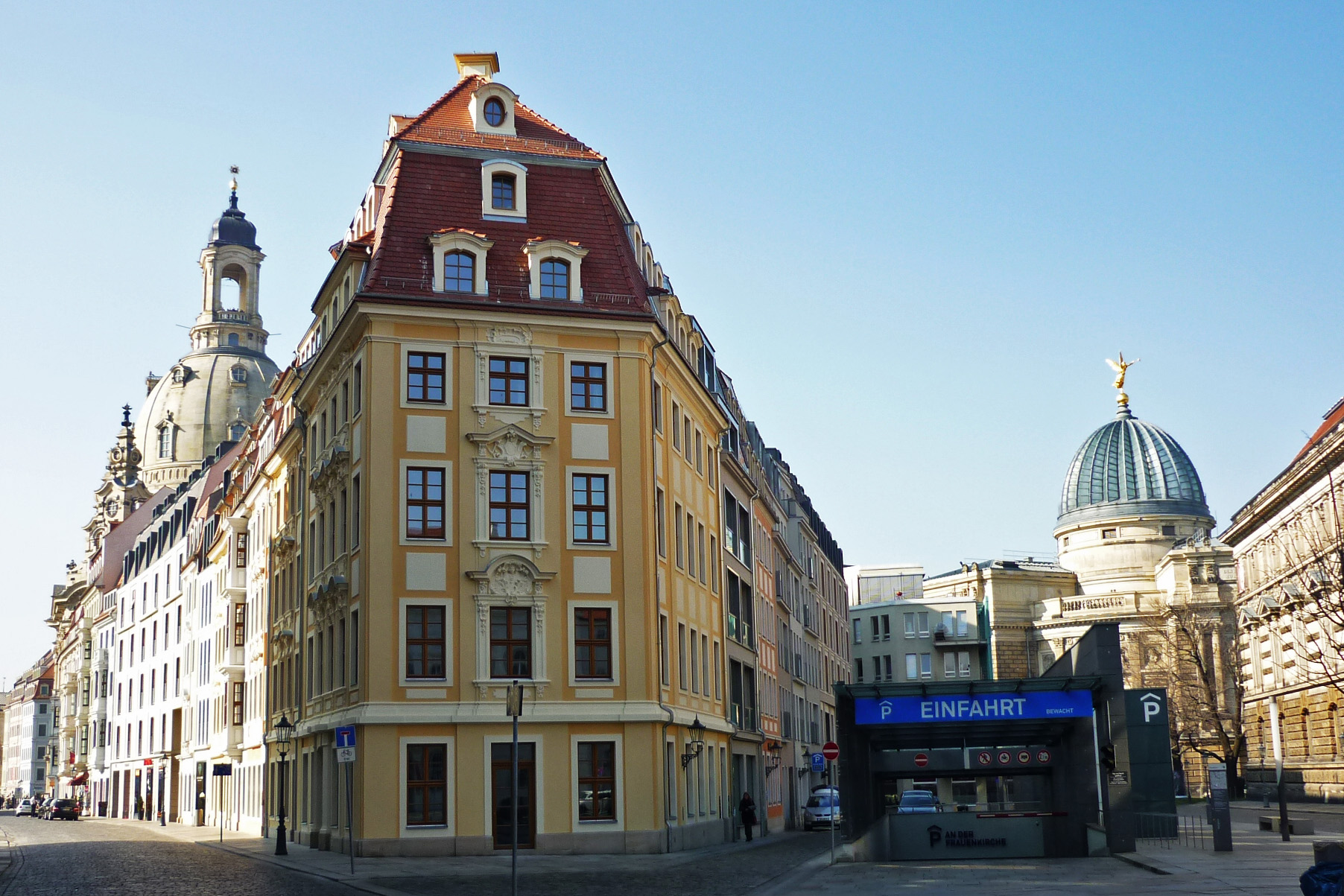
Reason for the foundation of GHND: the underground car park entrance in Salzgasse and the modernist extension behind the Coselpalais

The Dresden Historical Neumarkt Society e. V. (GHND) (German: Gesellschaft Historischer Neumarkt Dresden e. V.) is an association founded in 1999, which is committed to reconstructing the historic city centre of the German city of Dresden as much as possible.

== History ==
The World War Two destruction of Dresden's historic centre began the desire for its reconstruction. Before the war, Dresden was seen as a unique, remarkable and extraordinarily beautiful example of civic baroque architecture that was beyond compare in Northern Europe. The night of February 13/14 1945 destroyed the whole town centre with all the residential buildings in the Neumarkt area.

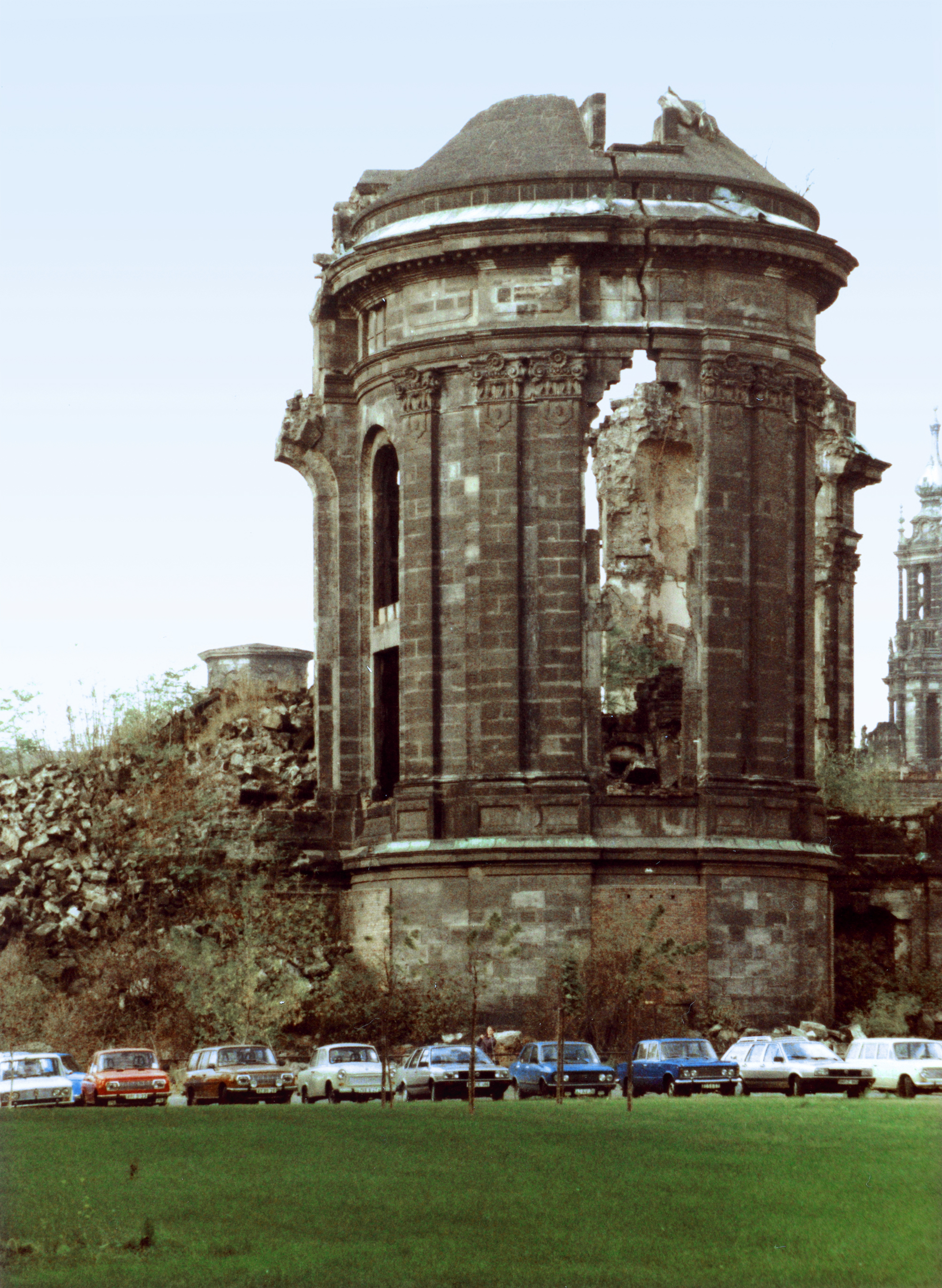
The still ruinous Dresden Frauenkirche in the undeveloped Neumarkt in October 1985

Following the war destruction, some historical buildings like the Zwinger Palace and the Semper Opera had been reconstructed by the GDR authorities, but very little development had taken place on the site of the former Neumarkt. The socialist authorities had demolished all but a few of the war ruins that had remained in the Neumarkt with plans of building a new socialist Dresden. These plans came to nothing and the site remained undeveloped into the 1980s. This provided the opportunity for its reconstruction on the original historic footings.

== Work ==
When plans for the rebuilding of Dresden's Frauenkirche became certain, the (GHND) began calls for the reconstruction of the historic buildings that surrounded it. They wanted the Neumarkt to be redesigned according to the model of the site, with small plots and the possible restoration of the facades and roof landscape from before 1945. This began a fiery debate in Dresden. Architects protested against reconstructing baroque buildings, arguing that rebuilding would be a form of "cultural bankruptcy".

However, in 2003, a petition in support of reconstructing the Neumarkt area was created and when it was given to the mayor of Dresden, it had been signed, within a few months, by nearly 68,000 people, amounting to 15% of the entire electorate. This had ground breaking results because it demonstrated a broad support for the aims of the initiative and a widespread appreciation for historical Dresden.

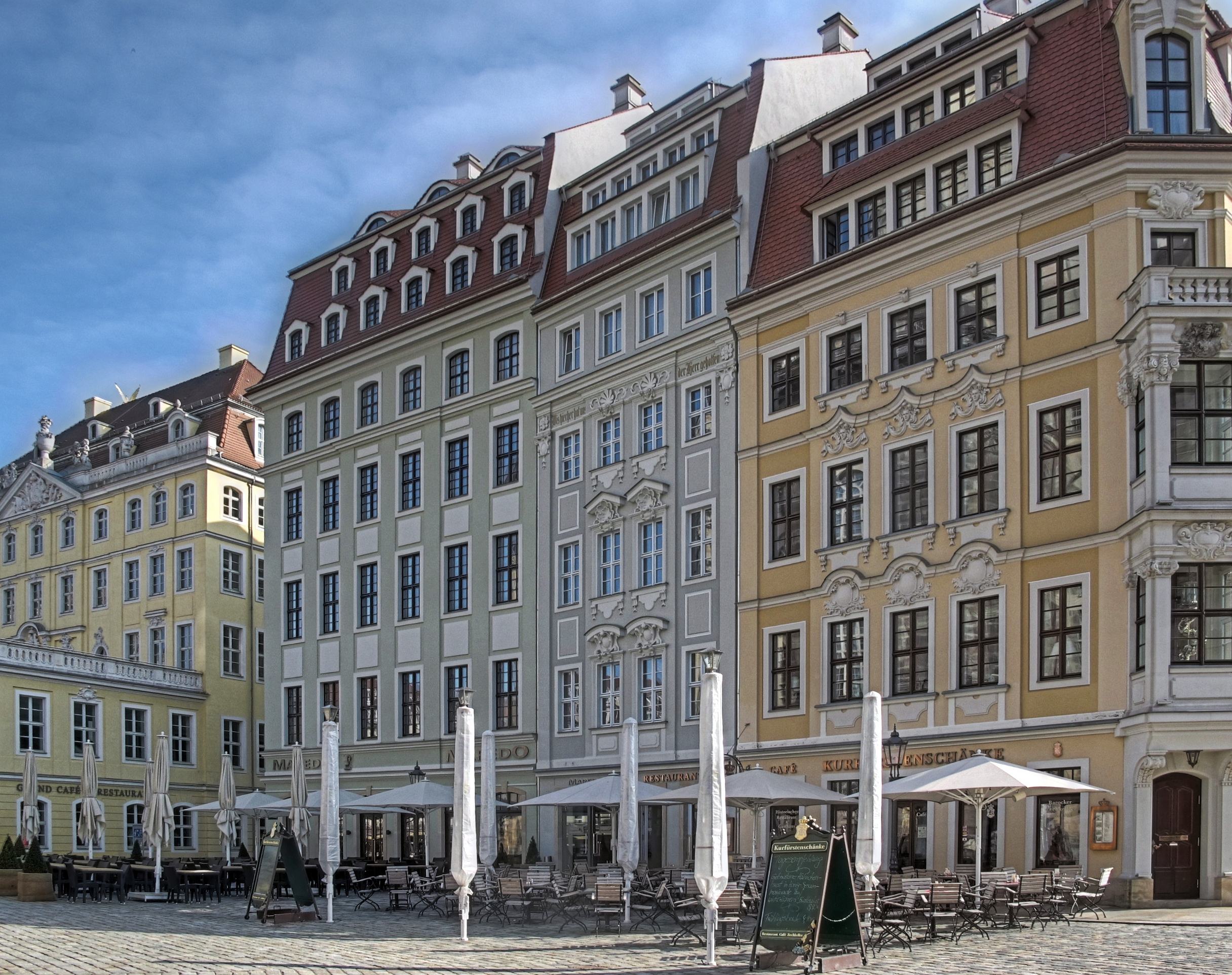
The Neumarkt with buildings designed according to historical models, thanks to work by the GDND, 2011

Eventually, the city council decided on a concept for rebuilding a large amount of baroque buildings in accordance to historical designs, but with modern buildings in between them. The council set up a commission to ensure that reconstructions were built and that modern buildings had to fit in with them and did not clash with the historic designs.

The association provided the necessary documentation for the reconstruction of the historic baroque buildings. The association has able to achieve partial success, however, the local design commission of the city has in many cases prevailed with its demands for modernist breaks within the baroque quarters.

Outside the Neumarkt, the GHND is also campaigning for reconstructions on the Königsufer (Neustädter Elbufer) and on the Neustädter Markt on the other side of the Elbe, in particular for the former Baroque town hall and other valuable community centre buildings.

The GHND operates its own information sites, with extensive lectures and publications and aims to be strong instrument of civil society engagement. It is nationally and internationally networked, such as with Stadtbild Deutschland e. V., INTBAU, with A Vision of Europe and Friends of Dresden in the USA. It is also financially supported by the Max Kade Foundation New York. Since 2009, the society has expanded its programmatic objectives: It is now generally committed to the "preservation and reconstruction of the historical evidence of architecture and urban development in the inner city of Dresden that characterises the cityscape". On December 11, 2010, a "friend and generous sponsor", the German-American Nobel Prize winner and President of the "Friends of Dresden", Günter Blobel was elected honorary member of the society.

GHND Chairman Torsten Kulke received the Henry Hope Reed Award from the University of Notre Dame in 2018 for his commitment.

== Literature ==
- Hans Joachim Neidhardt: Ten Years of Society Historischer Neumarkt Dresden 1st episode. in: Harald Streck: New Urbanism: Yearbook 2011 - Cityscape Germany. Books on Demand, 2012, S. 9ff.
- Ulrich Schönemann: Ten Years of Society Historischer Neumarkt Dresden 3rd episode. in: Harald Streck: New Urbanism: Yearbook 2013 - Cityscape Germany. Books on Demand, 2014, S. 9 ff.
