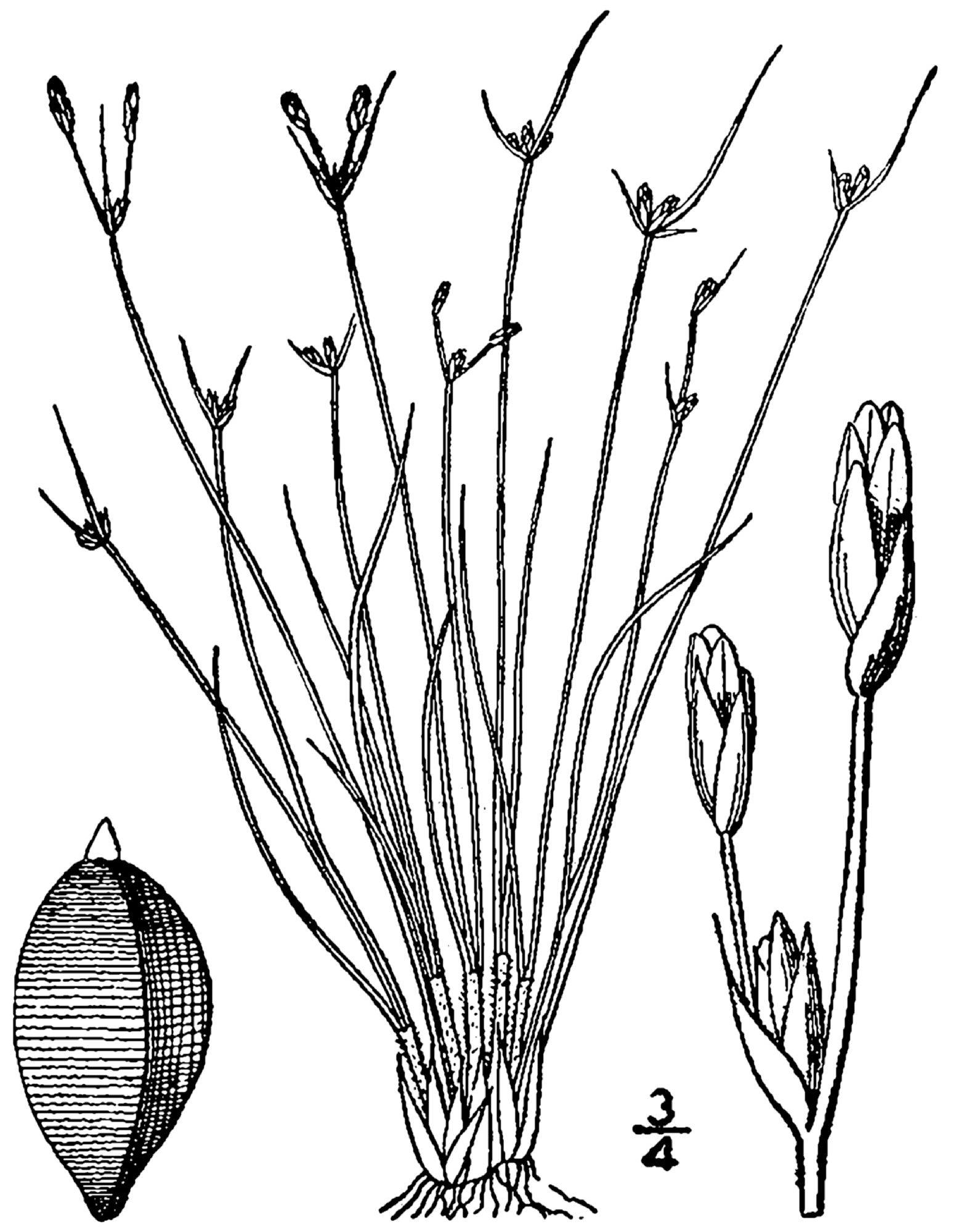
- 1913 illustration

Conservation status
- Least Concern (IUCN 3.1)

Scientific classification
- Kingdom: Plantae
- Clade: Tracheophytes
- Clade: Angiosperms
- Clade: Monocots
- Clade: Commelinids
- Order: Poales
- Family: Cyperaceae
- Genus: Bulbostylis
- Species: B. capillaris

Binomial name
- Bulbostylis capillaris (L.) Kunth ex C.B.Clarke

Synonyms
- Scirpus capillaris L.; Isolepis capillaris (L.) Roem. & Schult.; Trichelostylis capillaris (L.) Alph.Wood.; Fimbristylis capillaris (L.) A.Gray; Iria capillaris (L.) Kuntze; Stenophyllus capillaris (L.) Britton; Abildgaardia capillaris (L.) Lye; Cyperus minimus L.; Isolepis fusca Link; Fimbristylis tenella Raddi; Fimbristylis coarctata Schwein. in L.C.Beck; Isolepis muehlenbergii A.Dietr.; Isolepis coarctata Torr.; Oncostylis ciliata Nees; Oncostylis dubia Nees; Isolepis radiciflora Steud.; Scirpus trifidus Hance; Scirpus microstachys Boeckeler

= Bulbostylis capillaris =

Densetuft hairsedge

Species of grass-like plant

Bulbostylis capillaris is a species of sedge known by the common names densetuft hairsedge and threadleaf beakseed. It is native to much of North America, South America and the West Indies from Canada to Bolivia.

Bulbostylis capillaris grows in many types of habitat, generally in moist areas such as streamside meadows. It is an annual herb which is somewhat variable in appearance but generally takes the form of a small, upright tuft of green herbage growing close to the ground, between 10 and 24 centimeters tall. There are several stems surrounded by thready, thin leaves. The inflorescence occurs at the tip of the stem and is composed of tiny spikelets which are green washed with rusty red. The fruit is about a millimeter long.

== Uses ==
Along with Piptochaetium montevidense and Juncus capillacaeus, Bulbostylis capillaris is used in Rio Grande do Sul as a medicinal plant in the form of a tisane to treat urinary tract infections (UTIs). This claim of antimicrobial activity against two common causes of UTIs, E. coli and Klebsiella pneumoniae, was investigated by Vogel et al. (2011) but found no evidence of effectiveness in treating bacterial infections.
