= Bulbostylis cangae =

Conservation status
- Endangered (IUCN 2.3)

Scientific classification
- Kingdom: Plantae
- Clade: Embryophytes
- Clade: Tracheophytes
- Clade: Spermatophytes
- Clade: Angiosperms
- Clade: Monocots
- Clade: Commelinids
- Order: Poales
- Family: Cyperaceae
- Genus: Bulbostylis
- Species: B. cangae

Binomial name
- Bulbostylis cangae C.S. Nunes & A. Gil - 2016

Species of flowering plant in the sedge family

Bulbostylis cangae is a species of flowering plant in the sedge family, Cyperaceae, that is endemic to the Serra dos Carajás in Brazil. It was first identified by Nunes et al. (2016) as part of a joint project with the Museu Paraense Emílio Goeldi and the Instituto Tecnológico Vale which identified 55 species of Cyperaceae in the Carajás National Forest and surrounding areas. The majority of these species were associated with ironstone outcrops, which are known as cangas locally.

Herbarium records of Bulbostylis cangae were collected from the municipalities of and around Parauapebas, including Serra Norte. However the species collected from Serra Norte were collected in the late 1970s and the species were never found again on the plateau, suggesting a decline in population in the area related to human settlement, iron ore extraction, and the entry of invasive species.

== Description ==
Bulbostylis cangae is a perennial sedge grass that grows from 11 to 48 centimeters (4.3 to 18.9 in) tall. It is found on the mountaintops of the Carajás area inside the clefts of the cangas. Phenotypically it resembles other members of the Bulbostylis genus, such as Bulbostylis medusae and Bulbostylis sellowiana.

== Ecology ==
So far this species is only known from the Serra dos Carajás region and has a projected decline in its area and quality of habitat due to current and planned mining in the area. However it has been suggested that Bulbostylis cangae, as a fast-growing plant that grows directly in the canga (rock), could be useful in iron ore mine remediation efforts.
