= Bulbostylis turbinata =

Scientific classification
- Kingdom: Plantae
- Clade: Tracheophytes
- Clade: Angiosperms
- Clade: Monocots
- Clade: Commelinids
- Order: Poales
- Family: Cyperaceae
- Genus: Bulbostylis
- Species: B. turbinata

Binomial name
- Bulbostylis turbinata S.T.Blake

Species of grass-like plant

Bulbostylis turbinata is a flowering plant in the sedge family, Cyperaceae that is native to Western Australia.

The annual grass-like plant has an erect and spreading habit and typically grows to a height of 5 to 15 centimetres (0 to 0 ft). It blooms between February and April producing brown flowers.

It is found in rock-holes and along creeks and rivers and on low-lying flats throughout a large area of the Pilbara, Mid West and Goldfields-Esperance regions where it grows in sandy-loamy-clay soils.
