= Ruan Yisan Heritage Foundation =

Non-governmental, non-profit organization

The Ruan Yisan Heritage Foundation is a non-governmental, non-profit organization created on June 9, 2006 (18 years ago), "to support and promote urban heritage conservation in China. It is a private foundation supervised by the Shanghai Administration Bureau of NGOs and Shanghai Municipal Urban Planning Administration Bureau." The Foundation is a member of the International National Trusts Organisation.

Founder Ruan Yisan is a former professor of urban planning at Tongji University of Shanghai and director of the National Research Center for Historic Cities in Shanghai. Nisan was awarded the renowned Henry Hope Reed Award in 2014.
