= High Knoll Fort =

Coordinates: 15.9440°S 5.7168°W

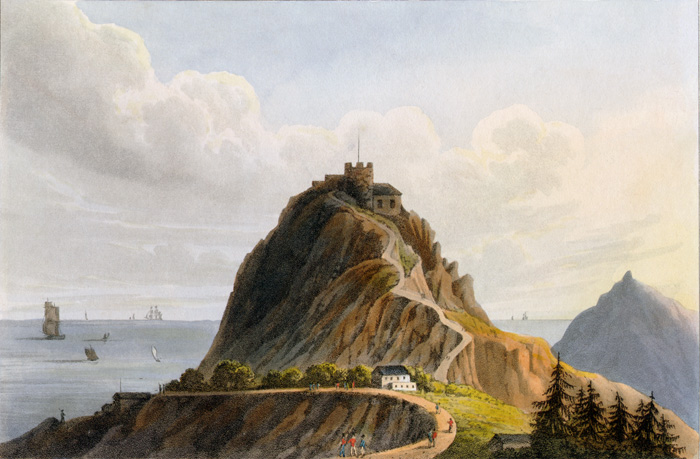
High Knoll Fort, 1821, by James Wathen

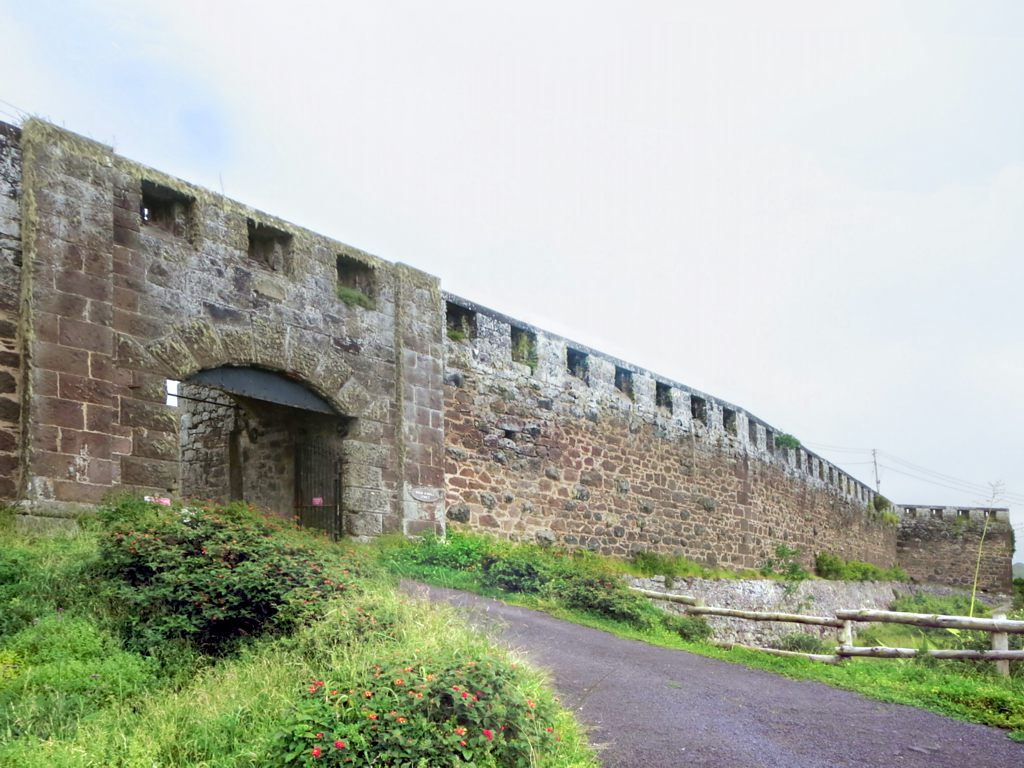
High Knoll Fort Gate

High Knoll Fort is a redoubt-style fort of the English East India Company on Saint Helena, an island and British overseas territory in the South Atlantic Ocean. High Knoll is 584 metres (1,916 ft) above sea level and is approximately one mile (1.6 km) south of historic Lower Jamestown. Reopened on 18 December 2010, it is now a tourist attraction for visitors, especially those on the tourist ships that come in the summer (January through April).

It looms over Jamestown, and was built to assist in defending the island against potential French invaders, being a redoubt for the islanders. The original fort was built in 1799 as a circular tower, sometimes referred to as a Martello tower, and along the lines of the tower at Simon's Town in South Africa. The purpose of the tower was to protect the rear approaches to the battery at Ladder Hill. The High Knoll tower was incorporated into the present structure, which dates from 1874, when the Royal Engineers rebuilt it.

During the Second Boer War, Boer prisoners from South Africa were briefly incarcerated at the Fort. (In addition, there were prisoner-of-war camps at Broadbottom, Deadwood No. 1, Deadwood No.2, and Jamestown.) Much later, the Fort served to quarantine imported chickens, sheep, and cattle. Then in the mid-1980s, NASA had a technician at the fort who ran a small tracking station.

Before it was rebuilt in the late 19th century, High Knoll Fort was known as the Citadel. It is the largest, most prominent, and most complete of the forts and military installations on the island. The Saint Helena National Trust has initiated a project to restore the fort. The fort is designated as a Grade I listed building.
