= Dresden Porcelain Collection =

Museum in Germany

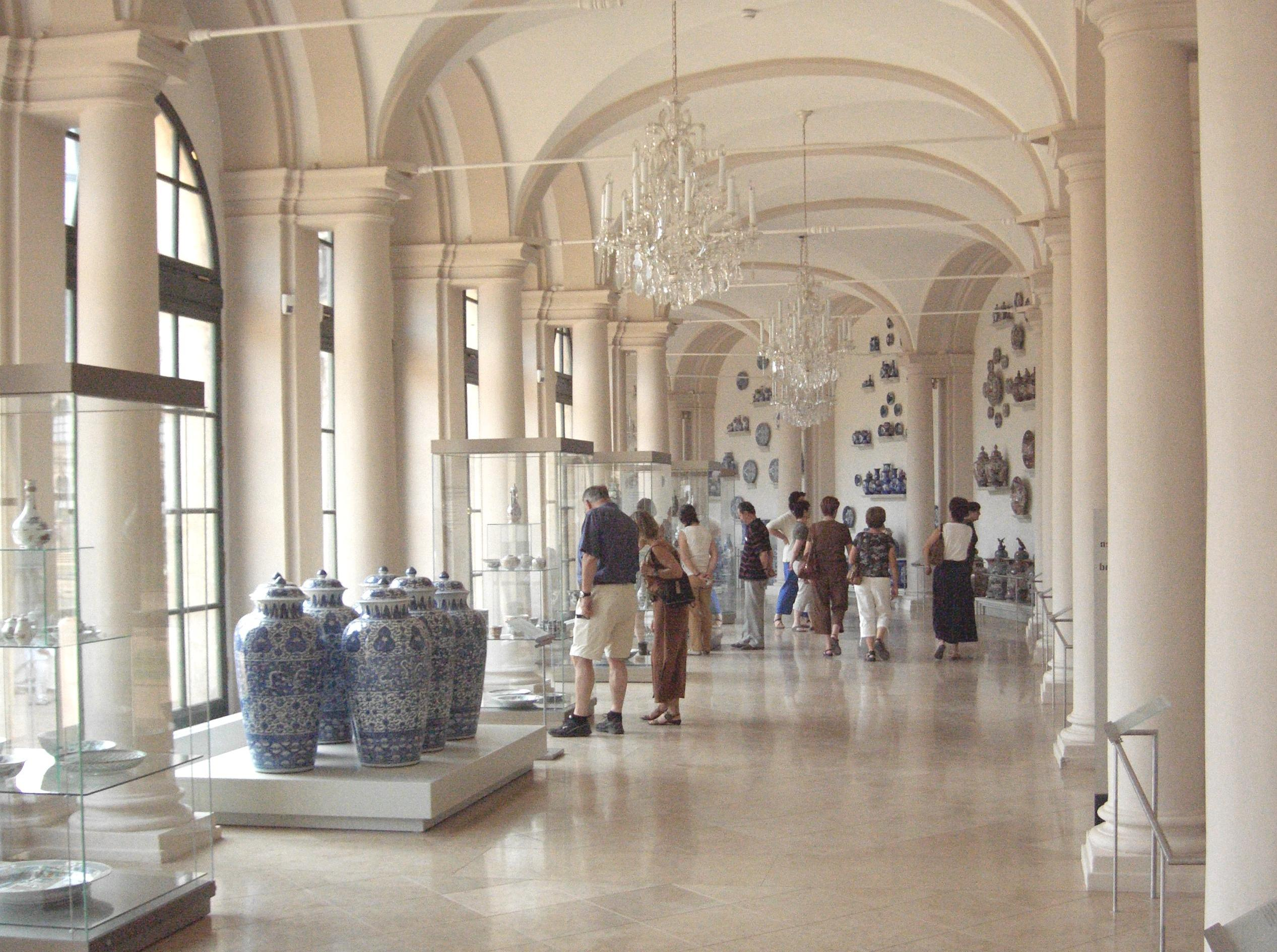
- Porzellansammlung
- Interactive fullscreen map
- Location: Dresden, Germany
- Coordinates: 51°03′08″N 13°44′05″E

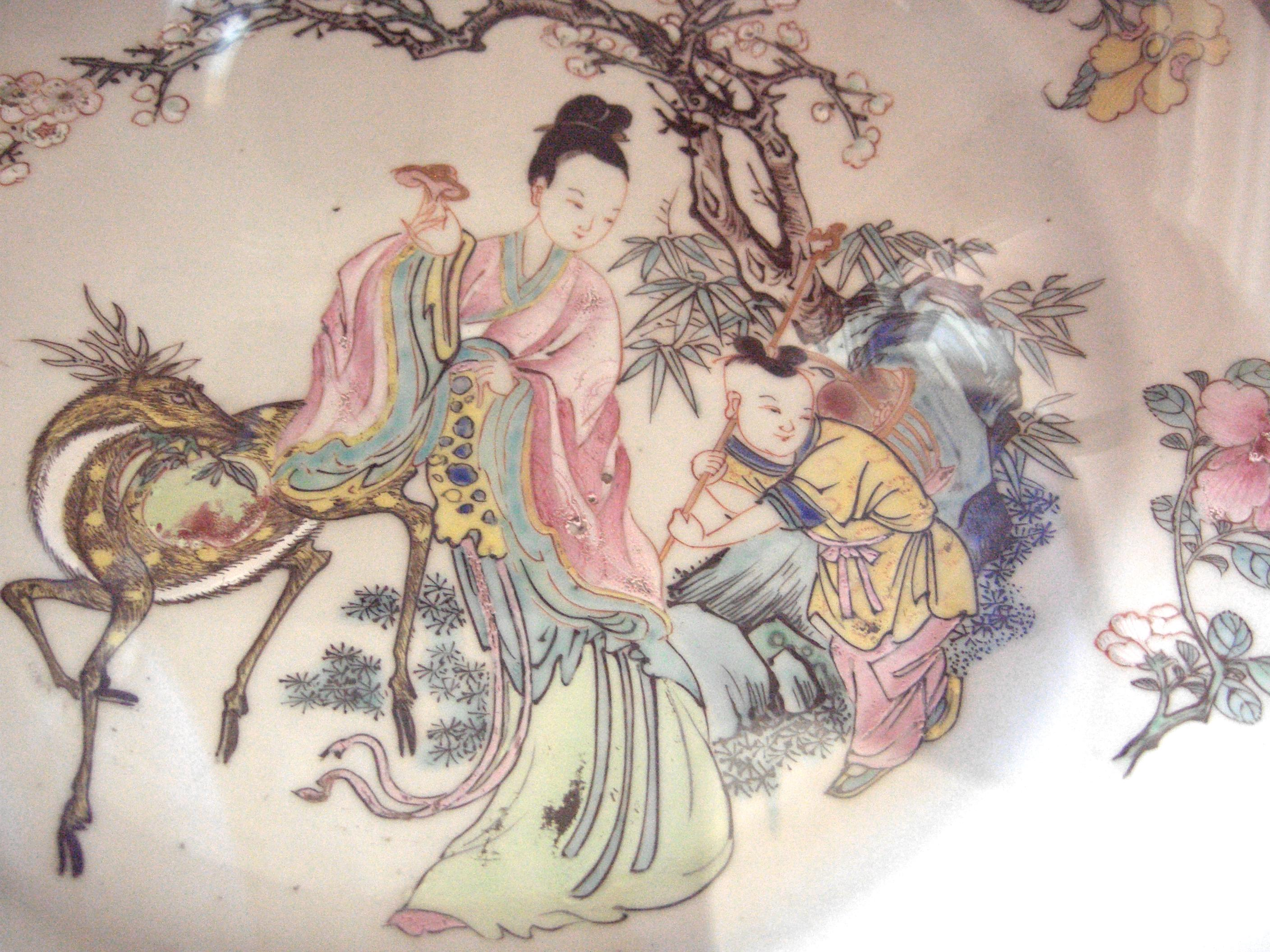
Chinese porcelain from the Qing period.

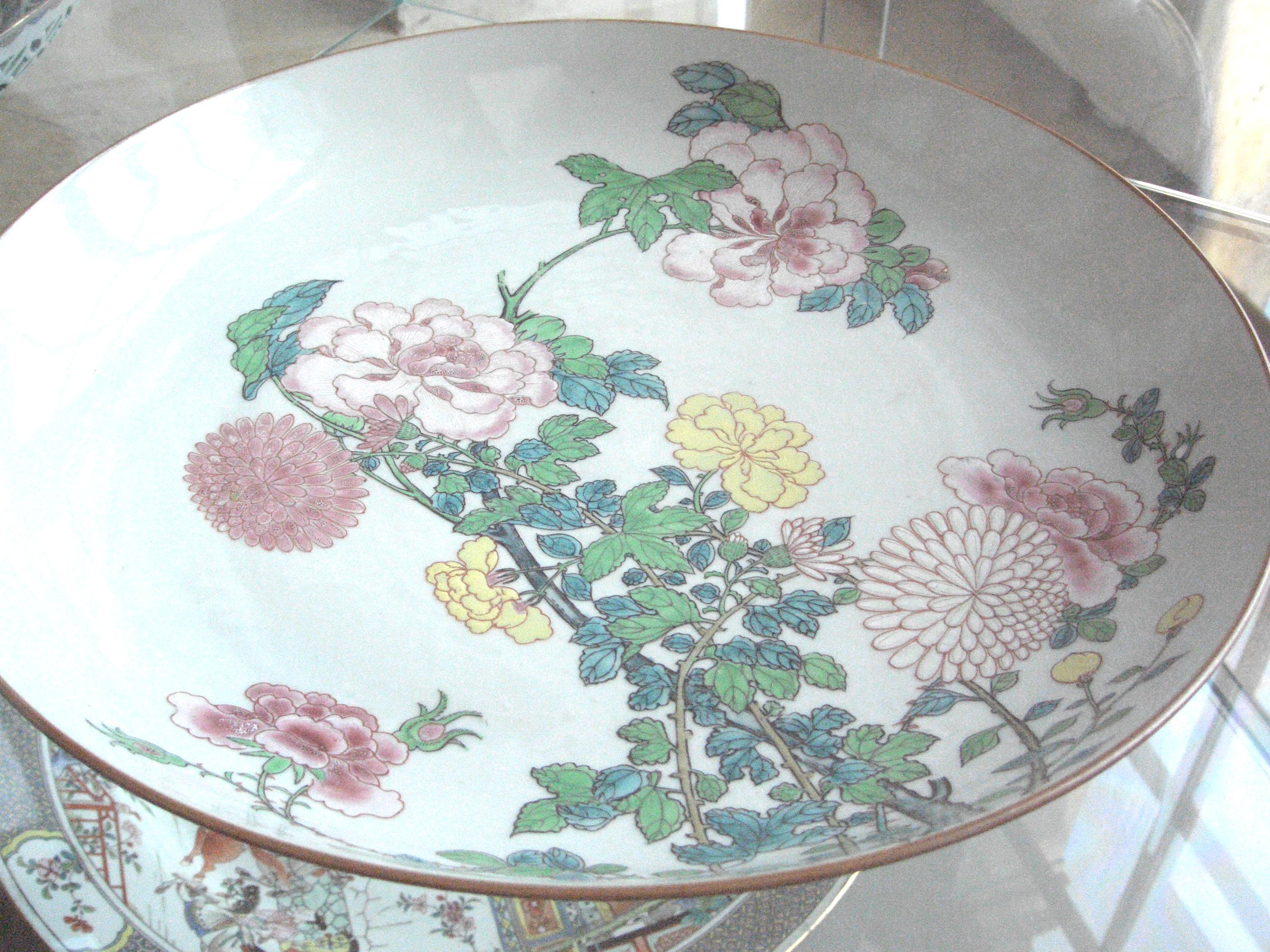

The Dresden Porcelain Collection (German: Porzellansammlung) is part of the Staatliche Kunstsammlungen (State Art Collections) of Dresden, Germany. It is located in the Zwinger Palace.

== History ==
The collection was founded in 1715 by the Saxon Prince-Elector Augustus the Strong, and was originally housed in the Japanese Palace (then known as the "Dutch Palace") on the banks of the Elbe. It moved into the Johanneum in 1876. The collection largely survived World War II thanks to evacuation, and moved into its current home in the south part of the Zwinger in 1962.

== Collection ==
Today the collection features about 20,000 porcelain artefacts.

One strength is the collection of traditional Chinese and Japanese porcelain acquired by Augustus the Strong. Above all this includes blue-and-white porcelain from the Ming and Qing Dynasties, in particular the "Dragoon Vases" acquired by Augustus from King Frederick William I in exchange for a regiment of dragoons. There are also colourful famille-verte and famille-rose items, white Dehua ceramics, Japanese Arita porcelain, and ceramics made especially for export.

The other strongpoint is the collection of Saxon porcelain, in particular Meissen porcelain. This crockery is decorated partly with Chinese patterns, but also with various European motifs such as scenes from mythology or rococo idylls. There are also numerous sculptures made of pure white or painted porcelain, including miniature comedians, musicians and court jesters (Schmiedel and Fröhlich), a table set created for King Frederick Augustus III, and a tableau of riders belonging to King Augustus III.

== Exhibition ==
Due to lack of space, not all the items are on permanent display. Today’s exhibition comprises around 2,000 artefacts, representing about 10 percent of the entire holdings.

A new gallery for the East Asian collection was opened in 2006, increasing the exhibition space by a quarter. It was created in a matter of months by the New York architect Peter Marino with a mixture of classical and modern elements. In the modern section, Japanese blue-and-white porcelain is presented on historic tables, in front of panels lacquered with anthracite grey and cinnabar. Marino carried out further redesigns in 2010.
