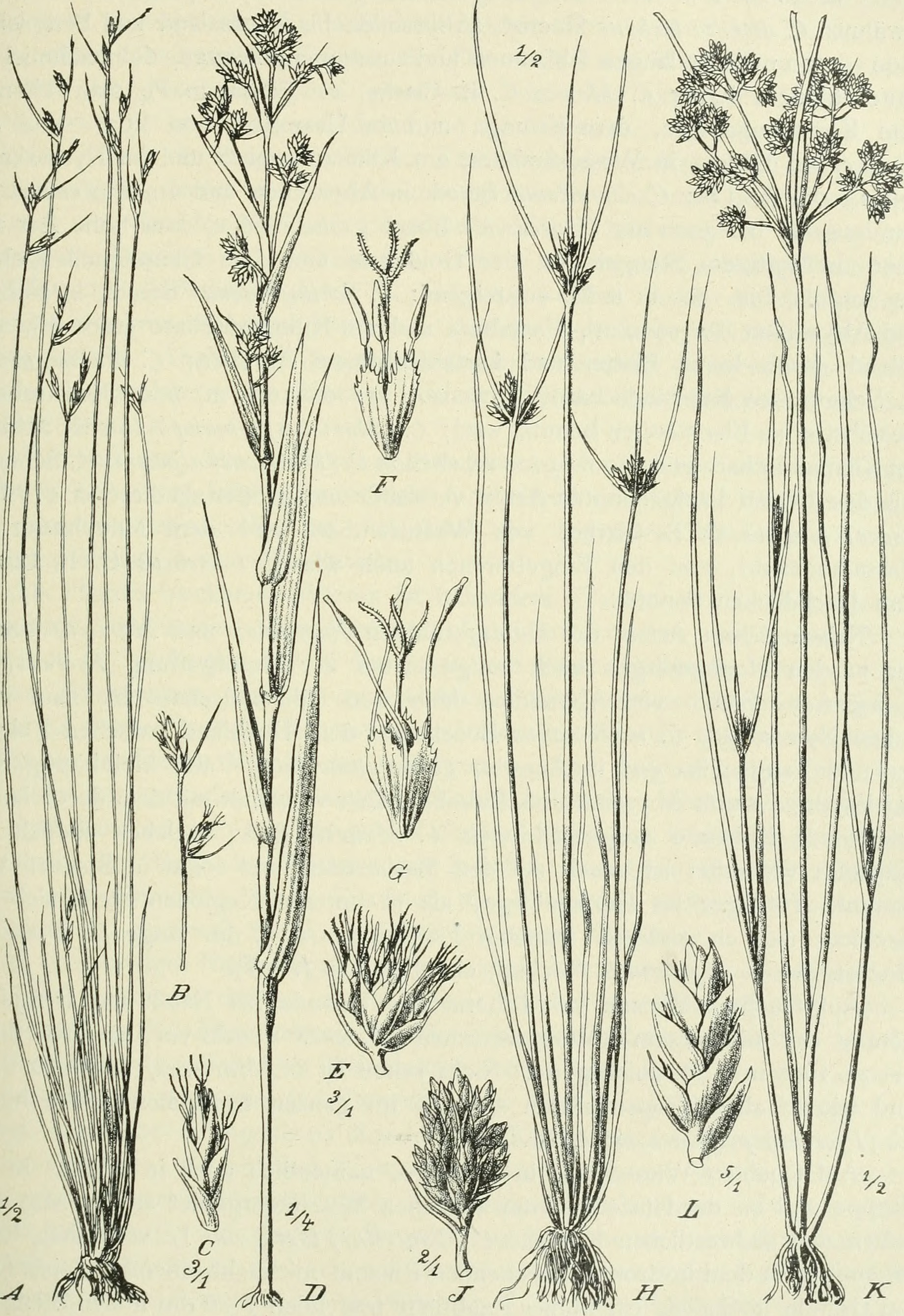

Scientific classification
- Kingdom: Plantae
- Clade: Tracheophytes
- Clade: Angiosperms
- Clade: Monocots
- Clade: Commelinids
- Order: Poales
- Family: Cyperaceae
- Genus: Bulbostylis
- Species: B. hispidula

Binomial name
- Bulbostylis hispidula (Vahl) R.W. Haines

= Bulbostylis hispidula =

Fynbiesie

Species of plant

Bulbostylis hispidula (Afrikaans: fynbiesie, "fine rush") is a plant native to South Africa, Eswatini, Botswana, and Namibia. The subspecies pyriformis can be found in all South African provinces except Western Cape. On the SANBI Red List, it is listed as "safe" (LC).

The species has an almost pan-tropical range: Central and northern South America; western, central, northeastern, eastern, and southern Africa, and southern Madagascar. There are several subspecies with somewhat narrower rangers, but this is not completely certain. They grow everywhere from grasslands with a rainy season and deserts to dry grasslands and marshes along the coast.

Bulbostylis hispidula is an annual or perennial plant with clumped seeds and a woody, fragrant root stock. The stem is 50–80 cm long and around 0.5-1.5 mm in diameter. The leaves are attached to the base of the stem. Sepals are light green and range from very hairy to almost bare. The leaves are 0.5 mm wide and less than 15 cm, often just 1–2 cm, long. The ovoid thorns are 4–15 mm long and 2–4 mm wide. The chromosomes are n=5.
