= Carl Laubin =

American-British painter (born 1947)

- Born: 1947 (age 78–79); New York City, US
- Education: Cornell University
- Style: architectural painting; capriccio
- Website: https://www.carllaubin.com/

Carl Laubin (born in 1947) is an American-British painter who specializes in architectural painting. He studied architecture and worked for architectural firms in London before he became a full-time painter in 1988. In the 1980s and 1990s, he made oil paintings that were used as architectural illustrations, notably for proposed buildings and redevelopments by Jeremy Dixon, Léon Krier and John Simpson.

As an independent painter, Laubin is known for his capricci in oil, depicting real and imaginary buildings. He has painted groups of buildings by individual architects composed into imaginary cities. Laubin received the Arthur Ross Prize for Fine Art in 2017 and the Henry Hope Reed Award in 2019.

== Early life and career ==
Carl Laubin was born in New York City in 1947. After graduating with a Bachelor of Arts degree in architecture from Cornell University in 1973, he moved to London and worked for British architectural firms. He worked for Douglas Stephen and Partners in 1973–1983 and Jeremy Dixon of Building Design Partnership in 1984–1986. In the 1980s and 1990s he worked prominently as a perspective illustrator for architects and developers. He became a British citizen in 2000.

== Paintings ==
At first, Laubin painted in oil in his spare time while studying and working for architectural firms. He was able to make it his primary occupation after he received attention for his oil paintings made as illustrations for projected buildings, notably Dixon's redevelopment of the Royal Opera House in London in 1986, Léon Krier's Atlantis project in Tenerife in 1987 and John Simpson's proposal for the Paternoster Square in London in 1988 and 1992. He became a full-time painter in 1988.

Laubin specializes in architectural painting, notably capricci. His subjects have included existing, proposed, modified and entirely imaginary buildings. He has created large capricci that depict imaginary cities consisting entirely of buildings by a single architect. Architects whose works have been the subjects of Laubin's paintings include Andrea Palladio, Christopher Wren, Nicholas Hawksmoor, Claude Nicolas Ledoux, Charles Robert Cockerell, Leo von Klenze, Edwin Lutyens, John Outram, Krier and John Nash. In A Classical Perspective (2012), he depicted buildings designed by recipients of the Driehaus Architecture Prize.

Among major influences, Laubin has mentioned Giovanni Battista Piranesi for his way of creating imaginary worlds and Canaletto for his urban compositions. According to Matthew Marani of The Architect's Newspaper, there are "plainly evident" influences from Joseph Gandy's "phantasmagoric visions". When Laubin makes a capriccio, he begins by collecting information about the subject by reading, visiting sites and sketching. He then creates and repeatedly re-organises collages of his sketches until he finds a satisfactory composition that represents the chronology and hierarchy of the buildings. He sketches landscapes from the sites of the buildings and incorporates these in the pictures. For the landscapes, Laubin uses a formula he learned from Outram. According to this model for classical landscapes, a picture should include a river or bridge that the viewer crosses into an area that ascends through different levels of human society, from cave dwellings, to agrarian culture, into urban society, and at the highest location a place of worship. Each cappricio takes one-and-a-half to three years to make.

The architectural historian David Watkin placed Laubin in a tradition of depicting good government and peace through cityscapes that goes back to the frescoes The Allegory of Good and Bad Government (1338–1340) by Ambrogio Lorenzetti. According to the architectural historian Amy Thomas, Laubin's paintings have traits of architectural perspective illustrations, capricci and English landscape painting. Thomas writes that they "brought character and liveliness to the standard repertoire of architectural media", not merely portraying a building as an object but "as a stage set for small everyday spectacles of human contact".

== Accolades ==
Laubin was awarded the 2017 Arthur Ross Prize for Fine Art from the Institute of Classical Architecture and Art. He received the Henry Hope Reed Award in 2019.
