= Bulbostylis haitiensis =

Scientific classification
- Kingdom: Plantae
- Clade: Tracheophytes
- Clade: Angiosperms
- Clade: Monocots
- Clade: Commelinids
- Order: Poales
- Family: Cyperaceae
- Genus: Bulbostylis
- Species: B. haitiensis

Binomial name
- Bulbostylis haitiensis Kük.

Species of grass-like plant

Bulbostylis haitiensis is a species of plant in the family Cyperaceae first described by Georg Kükenthal. No subspecies are listed in the Catalogue of Life.
