= Bulbostylis burbidgeae =

Conservation status
- Priority Four — Rare Taxa (DEC)

Scientific classification
- Kingdom: Plantae
- Clade: Tracheophytes
- Clade: Angiosperms
- Clade: Monocots
- Clade: Commelinids
- Order: Poales
- Family: Cyperaceae
- Genus: Bulbostylis
- Species: B. burbidgeae

Binomial name
- Bulbostylis burbidgeae K.L.Wilson

Species of grass-like plant

Bulbostylis burbidgeae is a flowering plant in the sedge family, Cyperaceae, that is native to Western Australia.

The annual grass-like plant has a tufted to erect and spreading habit and typically grows to a height of 3 to 25 centimetres (1 to 10 in). It blooms between March and August producing brown flowers.

It is found among granite outcrops and at cliff bases in the Pilbara region north of Newman where it grows in granitic soils.

The species was first described in 1980 by Karen Wilson, and the species epithet, burbidgeae, honours Nancy Burbidge.
