= Bulbostylis bathiei =

Scientific classification
- Kingdom: Plantae
- Clade: Tracheophytes
- Clade: Angiosperms
- Clade: Monocots
- Clade: Commelinids
- Order: Poales
- Family: Cyperaceae
- Genus: Bulbostylis
- Species: B. bathiei

Binomial name
- Bulbostylis bathiei Cherm.

Species of grass-like plant

Bulbostylis bathiei is a species of plant in the family Cyperaceae first described by Henri Chermezon. No subspecies listed in the Catalogue of Life.
