= The Old-House Journal =

American magazine

- Publisher: Active Interest Media; Home Buyer Publications
- Founded: 1973
- Company: Active Interest Media
- Country: United States
- Based in: Denver
- Website: oldhouseonline.com
- ISSN: 0094-0178
- OCLC: 10107662

The Old-House Journal is an American magazine that specializes in information about the restoration of old houses.

Its first issue was published in 1973 in Brooklyn, New York, as a black-and-white, advertising-free newsletter for devotees of the urban Brownstone Revival Movement in East Coast cities that reacted against the urban renewal devastation of the 1960s. Among the early, small group of publications devoted to the new field of Historic Preservation, in its first decade Old-House Journal was also representative of the "alternative press" of the era, which included music publications Rolling Stone and Crawdaddy, and even shelter magazines like Mother Earth News and the early Fine Homebuilding, in the way it featured content-rich (often reader-written editorial) with a non-mainstream format and perspective.

Its longtime editors are Clem Labine (founder), Patricia Poore (current) and Gordon Bock. By the early 1990s, as historic building restoration grew more mainstream and attracted competing coverage in TV and other print vehicles, Old-House Journal evolved into a nationally published glossy magazine. The magazine is currently part of Active Interest Media and is jointly published by Active Interest Media and Home Buyer Publications. Around 2010 its headquarters moved to Denver after a brief stint in Chantilly, Virginia.
