= Krista De Jonge =

Belgian architectural historian

- Born: 1959
- Awards: Member of the Royal Flemish Academy of Belgium for Science and the Arts; member of Academia Europaea
- Scientific career
- Fields: History of architecture
- Institutions: KU Leuven
- Thesis: La travée alternée dans l'architecture de la Renaissance (1987)

Krista De Jonge (born 1959) is a Belgian architectural historian and full professor of architectural history at KU Leuven.

== Career ==
She received a master's degree in engineering and architecture at KU Leuven in 1982, a Master of Advanced Studies at the Centre d'Études Supérieures de la Renaissance at François Rabelais University, Tours in 1983 and a PhD in engineering/architecture at KU Leuven in 1987. She was a French government grant holder from 1982 to 1984, a junior research fellow at the Research Foundation - Flanders (FWO) from 1984 to 1988 and an associate professor (hoofddocent) of architectural history at KU Leuven from 1988 to 1996. She was promoted to professor (hoogleraar) in 1996 and to full professor (gewoon hoogleraar) in 2001.

Her research focuses on Netherlandish Renaissance architecture, the construction history of the Middle Ages and early modern period, and Burgundian/Habsburg court residences within a European context. She is a member of the Royal Academy of Archaeology of Belgium, the Royal Flemish Academy of Belgium for Science and the Arts (since 2001) and Academia Europaea (since 2013).
