= Saint Helena National Trust =

Environmental organization on Saint Helena

Coordinates: 15.92553°S 5.71754°W

- Type: Nonprofit organization
- Founded: May 22, 2002; 24 years ago in Saint Helena
- Headquarters: Jamestown, Saint Helena
- Key people: Michel Dancoisne-Martineau (president); Neil Fantom (vice president); Helena Bennett (director)
- Website: www.trust.org.sh

The Saint Helena National Trust is an independent not-for-profit organisation which aims to preserve Saint Helena's environmental and cultural heritage. It was founded on 22 May 2002, the 500th anniversary of Saint Helena's discovery.

The trust was established under the St Helena National Trust Ordinance, 2001. Its principle objectives are to preserve, maintain, manage, protect and augment, tender advice, promote access to and enjoyment of land, buildings, animal life, plant life, marine life, furniture, pictures, and documents and chattels of any description having national or historic or artistic interest. It is a member of the International National Trusts Organisation.

== Activities ==
The Millennium Forest is a 250-hectare area of replanting on the island, which aims to restore part of what was the Great Wood. The trust continues to repopulate the forest and uses it for community engagement, connecting the endemic species and invertebrates, in lesson planning, and for general awareness.

The trust is committed to the conservation of the Saint Helena plover, the national bird of the island, which is locally known as the wirebird. The Darwin Plus 107 project assists the Trust with the reduction of invasive vertebrate species that serve as a threat to the wirebird population. The Trust undertakes an annual census of plovers. Numbers averaged around 250 between 2006 and 2016 but in the 250 census the number was estimated at 583 adult birds. The Royal Society for the Protection of Birds is working with the Trust to improve habitat management to support plovers.

In 2006, Michel Dancoisne-Martineau donated the heart-shaped Waterfall Valley to the trust. A new pathway was constructed through the valley, which opened in December 2010.

In 2018 the trust established a marine conservation section, working in partnership with Blue Marine Foundation, with a key focus being whale sharks, known locally as "bone sharks".

On 30 August 2024, the short documentary film Bone Shark Island, a co-production between Saint Helena National Trust and Swimming Head Productions, was released, and in 2025, it was declared the joint winner of the Houston Underwater Film Festival.

The trust also wants to preserve and promote the island's built heritage, especially that from the 17th and 18th centuries. The trust have begun a project to restore High Knoll Fort near Jamestown.

The trust is currently working on the digitisation of the archives, particularly focusing on the East India Company records of St Helena from 1673 and 1834. It also runs guided tours of Rupert's Valley, teaching visitors about Saint Helena's role in the freeing of slaves from the Atlantic slave trade.
