= David Watkin (architectural historian) =

British architectural historian

David John Watkin, FRIBA FSA (7 April 1941 – 30 August 2018) was a British architectural historian. He was an emeritus fellow of Peterhouse, Cambridge, and professor emeritus of History of Architecture in the Department of History of Art at the University of Cambridge. He also taught at the Prince of Wales's Institute of Architecture.

Watkin's main research interest was neoclassical architecture, particularly from the 18th century to the present day, and he published widely on that topic. He also published on general topics including A History of Western Architecture (7th ed. 2023) and English Architecture: A Concise History (2nd ed. 2001), as well as more specialised monographs on architects. He was an honorary fellow of the Royal Institute of British Architects. He was vice-chairman of the Georgian Group, and was a member of the Historic Buildings Council and its successor bodies in English Heritage from 1980 to 1995.

His work Morality and Architecture (1977) inspired the title of English electronic band Orchestral Manoeuvres in the Dark's third studio album, Architecture & Morality, after a suggestion from a friend of the band, Martha Ladly, who is also credited with the title of their 1984 single Tesla Girls.

== Biography ==
He was born in Salisbury, the son of Thomas Watkin, a director of a builders' merchants, and his wife Vera. He was brought up in Farnham, and educated at Farnham Grammar School. He entered Trinity Hall, Cambridge, where he was an exhibitioner, and in Part I of the Tripos read English.

Watkin then took a first in Part II of the Fine Arts Tripos. He went on to write a Ph.D. under Nikolaus Pevsner on Thomas Hope, which was published in 1968 as Thomas Hope and the Neo-Classical Idea, 1769–1831.

Watkin spent his career at Cambridge. He was Librarian of the Fine Arts Faculty from 1967 to 1972, University Lecturer in the History of Art between 1972 and 1993, and Reader in the History of Architecture between 1993 and 2001. He was head of the Department of History of Art from 1989 to 1992 and from 2006 to 2007.

From 1970 to 2008, he was a fellow of Peterhouse, Cambridge, where he belonged to a circle of right-wing intellectuals centred on the historian Maurice Cowling.

== Views ==
In a lecture of 1968, Watkin began to develop a critique of modernism, in an attack on Pevsner, his research supervisor. His views came to wider attention with his book Morality and Architecture: The Development of a Theme in Architectural History and Theory from the Gothic Revival to the Modern Movement (1977); it was re-published in expanded form as Morality and Architecture Revisited (2001). A polemical work, it identified a context for Pevsner of French and British authors using deterministic arguments. Pevsner was defended in a review of Morality and Architecture by Reyner Banham, another pupil, who called it "offensive".

Relying on The Poverty of Historicism by Karl Popper, Watkin argued that use of the Zeitgeist concept in architectural history was fallacious. He traced back culprits to Augustus Pugin.

Among the contemporary architects Watkin championed were John Simpson and Quinlan Terry, as well as theorist Léon Krier. In his book on Terry, Radical Classicism: The Architecture of Quinlan Terry (2006) Watkin was forthright: "The modernism with which Quinlan Terry has had to battle is, like the Taliban, a puritanical religion."

== Works ==
- David Watkin, English Architecture, 'The World of Art Library' series, Thames & Hudson, London, 1979.
- David Watkin, The Rise of Architectural History, Eastview Editions, London, Reprint edition, 1980.
- David Watkin, The English Vision. John Murray, London, 1982.
- David Watkin, Athenian Stuart: Pioneer of the Greek Revival. Harper Collins, New York, 1982.
- David Watkin, Morality and Architecture: The Development of a Theme in Architectural History and Theory from the Gothic Revival to the Modern Movement. University of Chicago Press, Chicago, (1984/original 1977).
- David Watkin, The Royal Interiors of Regency England. Rizzoli, New York, 1985.
- David Watkin, A History of Western Architecture, various editions and publishers, 1st edn 1986, 7th edn, revised by Owen Hopkins, 2023
- David Watkin (Ed), Sir John Soane: Enlightenment Thought and the Royal Academy Lectures (Cambridge Studies in the History of Architecture) Cambridge University Press, 1996.
- David Watkin (Ed). Sir John Soane: The Royal Academy Lectures, Cambridge University Press, Cambridge, 2000.
- David Watkin, Morality and Architecture Revisited, University of Chicago Press, Chicago, 2001.
- David Watkin, English Architecture: A Concise History, W. W. Norton and Co. Inc., New York, 2001.
- David Watkin and Robin Middleton, Architecture of the Nineteenth Century. Phaidon Inc Ltd, London, 2003.
- David Watkin, The Architect King: George III and the Culture of the Enlightenment. Royal Collection, London. 2004.
- David Watkin, Radical Classicism: The Architecture of Quinlan Terry. Rizzoli, New York, 2006.
- Christopher Hartop, Philippa Glanville, Diana Scarisbrick, Charles Truman, David Watkin, and Matthew Winterbottom, Royal Goldsmiths: The Art of Rundell & Bridge. John Adamson, Cambridge, 2006.
- David Watkin, Carl Laubin: The Poetry of Art And Architecture. Philip Wilson Publishers, London, 2007.
- David Watkin, The Roman Forum, Profile Books, London, 2009.
- David Watkin, The Practice of Classical Architecture: The Architecture of Quinlan and Francis Terry, 2005–2015. Rizzoli, New York, 2015. ISBN 978-0-8478-4490-6.
- David Watkin, The Architecture of John Simpson: The Timeless Language of Classicism. Rizzoli, New York, 2016. ISBN 978-0-8478-4869-0.
