= National Trust Sri Lanka =

Heritage organisation

The National Trust – Sri Lanka or National Trust for Cultural and Natural Heritage is a non-profit organisation, which works to preserve and protect the natural and cultural heritage of Sri Lanka and to increase public awareness of the country's historic and architectural treasures. The Trust was founded on 25 May 2005 by archaeologists, Professor Senake Bandaranayake and Doctor Roland Silva.

These activities of the Trust are primarily directed towards what is not already protected or safeguarded by the Government, through the Archaeological Department of Sri Lanka and the Central Cultural Fund.

The National Trust – Sri Lanka has built a good working relationship with other National Trusts worldwide, equally with the organisations and their members, in places such as Canada, Scotland, England, Ireland, Wales, and the United States.

== Projects ==
=== Malwana fort ===
The National Trust has completed the first stage of conservation of the colonial fort at Malwana, with funds provided by the Prince Claus Foundation of Netherlands.

=== Lawton's photographs ===
The National Trust has completed the conservation of photographs of national heritage sites taken by Joseph Lawton between 1867 and 1875. The photographs are of sites in Anuradhapura, Mihintale, Polonnaruwa and Sigiriya and are contained in four volumes kept at the Department of Archaeology.

=== Artifacts index ===
The National Trust has prepared an index of over 500 artifacts found in several temples in the Gampaha District.

== Published works ==
- Raheem, Ismeth (2009). Archaeology & Photography - the early years 1868 -1880. National Trust, Sri Lanka. ISBN 978-955-0093-03-8.
- De Silva, Nimal; Chandrasekera, D. P. (2009). Heritage Buildings of Sri Lanka. National Trust, Sri Lanka. ISBN 978-955-0093-01-4.
- Bandaranayake, Senake; Dharmasiri, Albert (2009). Sri Lankan Painting in the 20th Century. National Trust, Sri Lanka. ISBN 978-955-0093-02-1.
- Wijeyaratne, Gehan de Silva (2009). Birds of Sri Lanka. National Trust, Sri Lanka. ISBN 978-955-0093-00-7.
- Miththapala, Sriyanie; Wijesundara, Siril; Galappatti, Janaki (2011). Flowering Plants commonly encountered in Sri Lankan habitats. National Trust, Sri Lanka. ISBN 978-955-9937-81-4.
- Perera, Nishan (2011). Coral Reefs of Sri Lanka. National Trust, Sri Lanka. ISBN 978-955-0093-04-5.
- De Silva, Nimal (Ed); Fernando, Sarala (Ed) (2013). Maritime Heritage of Lanka: Ancient Ports and Harbours. National Trust, Sri Lanka. ISBN 978-955-0093-07-6.
- Bentharage, Lionel (2015). The Art of Mask Making in Sri Lanka. National Trust, Sri Lanka.
