= International National Trusts Organisation =

The International National Trusts Organisation (INTO) is a network of national trusts and similar non-governmental organisations committed to preserving cultural heritage, "built and natural, tangible and intangible," including architecturally or historically significant items, and areas of natural beauty. INTO's mandate includes developing and promoting best practices, supporting existing national trust organisations, establishing new trusts, and advocating for heritage conservation.

INTO was formally established in December 2007 at the 12th International National Trusts Conference in New Delhi, India. It operates as a non-profit corporation registered in England and Wales, with headquarters in London.

INTO's secretary general and secretariat are supported by a board of trustees. Since 2015, the chair of the trustees has been Dame Fiona Reynolds, master of Emmanuel College Cambridge and former director general of the National Trust.

INTO membership represents more than 80 trusts spread across the globe.
