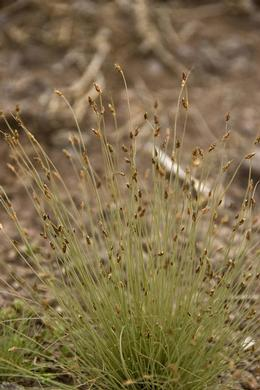
- Mature plant in flower

Conservation status
- Critically Endangered (IUCN 3.1)

Scientific classification
- Kingdom: Plantae
- Clade: Embryophytes
- Clade: Tracheophytes
- Clade: Spermatophytes
- Clade: Angiosperms
- Clade: Monocots
- Clade: Commelinids
- Order: Poales
- Family: Cyperaceae
- Genus: Bulbostylis
- Species: B. neglecta

Binomial name
- Bulbostylis neglecta (Hemsl.) C.B.Clarke

Synonyms
- Fimbristylis neglecta Hemsl.

= Bulbostylis neglecta =

Neglected tuft sedge

Species of grass-like plant

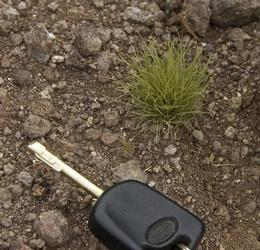
Scale picture of immature plant

Bulbostylis neglecta, neglected tuft sedge locally, is an endemic member of the Cyperaceae of Saint Helena in the South Atlantic.

Bulbostylis neglecta was first collected by William John Burchell in 1806, although the specimen was not described as a new species until 1884. Since then, it had not been recorded again and was presumed extinct until, in May, 2008, during a botanical survey of St Helena, a small population of the sedge was rediscovered by botanists Philip Lambdon and Andrew Darlow of the European Union's South Atlantic Invasive Species Project and by local naturalist Pat Joshua. Subsequent work by the project team located five distinct populations totalling about 4000 plants. The rediscovery was timely as the existing populations were being encroached on by an invasive African fountain grass Pennisetum setaceum.
