= Neumarkt (Dresden) =

Square in Dresden, Germany

Coordinates: 51°03′06″N 13°44′25″E

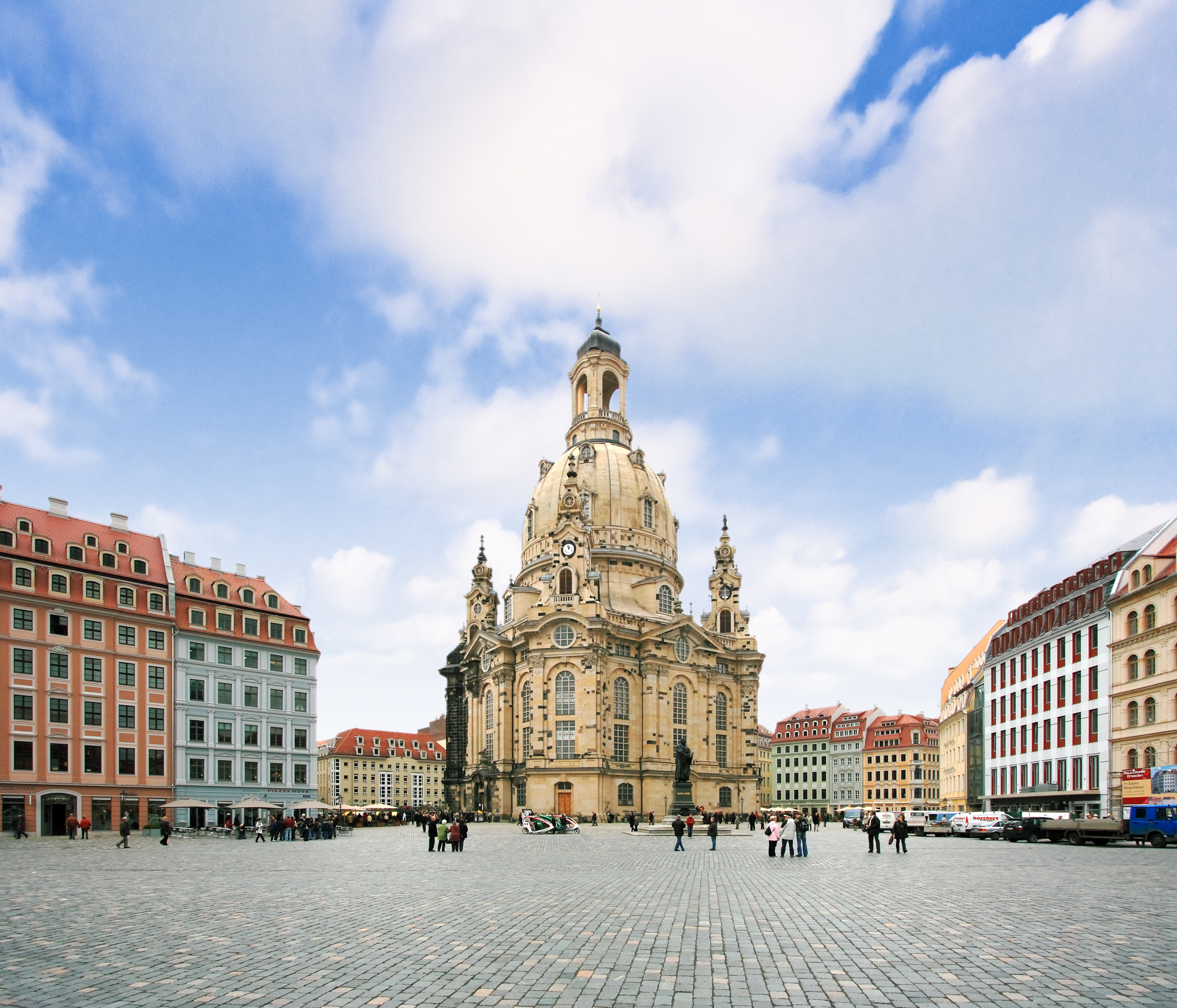
The Dresden Neumarkt in spring 2008

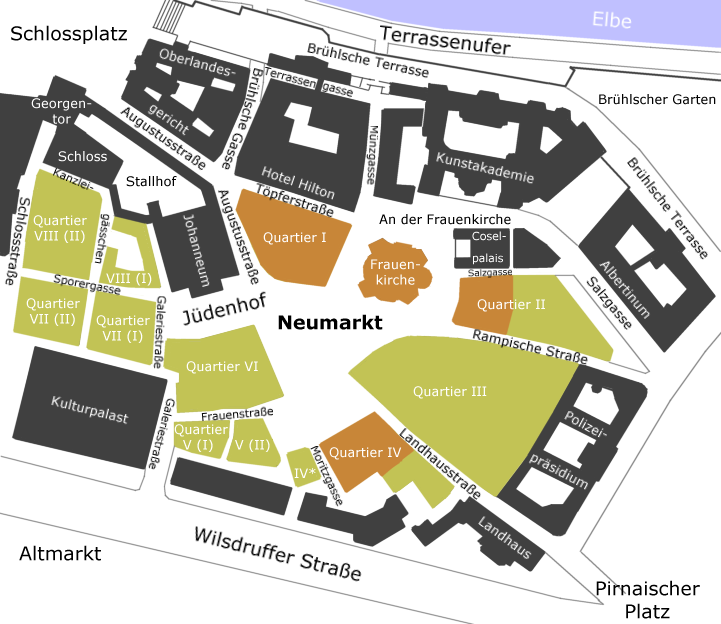
The quarters of Dresden's Neumarkt area

The Neumarkt (German pronunciation: [ˈnɔʏmaʁkt]) is a square and culturally significant section of central Dresden, Germany. The historic area was almost completely wiped out during the Allied bombing during the Second World War. After the war, Dresden fell under Soviet occupation, and later the communist German Democratic Republic, which rebuilt the Neumarkt area in socialist realist style and partially with historic buildings. However, huge areas and parcels of the place remained untilled. After the fall of Communism and German reunification, the decision was made to restore the Neumarkt to its pre-war look.

== History ==
Due to its location on a slight rise above the flood-prone Elbe River, the Neumarkt was one of the first areas of Dresden's old city to be settled, with a small village arising around the old Frauenkirche. However, it was not actually located within the city walls until the city was expanded in 1530, from which point on, the old town contained two market squares. The square located around the Kreuzkirche was renamed Altmarkt (German for "Old Market"), and the square surrounding the Frauenkirche was named the Neumarkt ("New Market").

During the reign of August II the Strong, a great number of structures in Dresden were built in Baroque style, including the present-day Frauenkirche, and numerous other houses surrounding the Neumarkt. After damage sustained to buildings through artillery fire in the Seven Years' War, a number of structures on the Neumarkt were rebuilt in the Rococo/Late Baroque style.

During the 19th century and into the early 20th century, the Neumarkt remained largely unchanged, except for renovations to the Johanneum completed in 1873 and the construction of the Albertinum and Academy of Fine Arts completed by the end of the 19th century.

=== Nazi era, bombing of Dresden, and communist era ===
The magnificent Romanesque Revival Semper Synagogue, the largest in Dresden, was destroyed by the Nazi government during Kristallnacht on the evening of November 9, 1938. During the bomb attack on Dresden in February 1945, the area around the Neumarkt was almost entirely destroyed in the resulting firestorm. The main structure of the Frauenkirche survived the initial bombing and firestorm, before collapsing a few days later. During the 1950s and 60s under rule of the German Democratic Republic, the Neumarkt and Altmarkt formed a mostly vacant area through the middle of the old city, save for the ruins of the Frauenkirche standing as a memorial to the horrors of war. The two squares were separated by the widened Wilsdruffer Strasse, then from 1969 by the Palace of Culture, and then later by new apartment blocks.

== Reconstruction ==
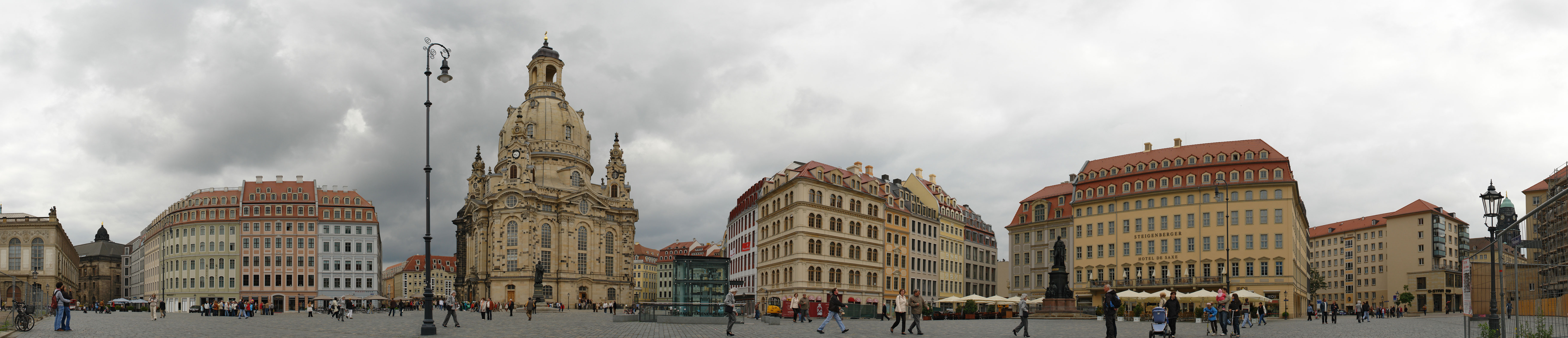
Panorama of reconstructed sections of the Dresdner Neumarkt in May 2008

The completion of the reconstructed Dresden Frauenkirche in 2005 marked the first step in rebuilding the Neumarkt. Organisations such as the Dresden Historical Neumarkt Society (GHND) actively encourage an historically-faithful reconstruction of the structures around the Neumarkt, giving an outward appearance as close as possible to that from before 1945.

The areas around the square have been divided into eight "quarters", with each being rebuilt as a separate project, the majority of buildings to be rebuilt either to the original structure or at least with a facade similar to the original.

Quarter III and quarter VII/1 are currently (2020) under construction. All other quarters have been completed.

=== Controversy and criticism ===
The reconstruction of the structures surrounding the Neumarkt has created some controversy, with architecture critic Andreas Ruby criticising the attempt to reconstruct the historic character of the city as inauthentic.

There has also been extensive debate as to what extent contemporary architecture should be present on the rebuilt Neumarkt.
