= Bombing of Dresden =

Aerial bombing attacks in 1945

- Part of the strategic bombing during World War II
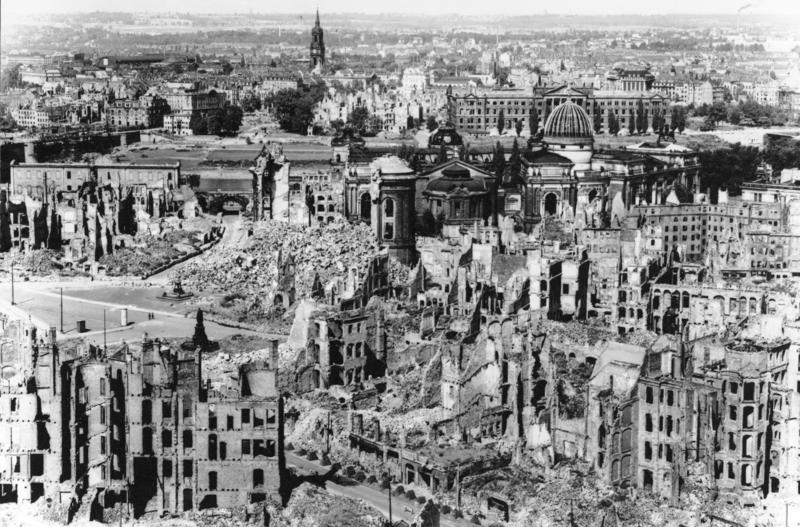
- Dresden after the bombing
Date	13–15 February 1945
Location	Dresden, Germany 51°03′00″N 13°44′24″E

Belligerents
United Kingdom; United States	Germany

Strength
769 RAF Lancaster heavy bombers; 9 RAF Mosquito medium bombers; 527 USAAF B-17 Flying Fortress heavy bombers; 784 USAAF P-51 Mustang fighters	28 Messerschmitt Bf 110 night fighters; Anti-aircraft guns

Casualties and losses
7 aircraft (1 B-17 and 6 Lancasters, with crews)	Up to 25,000 people killed

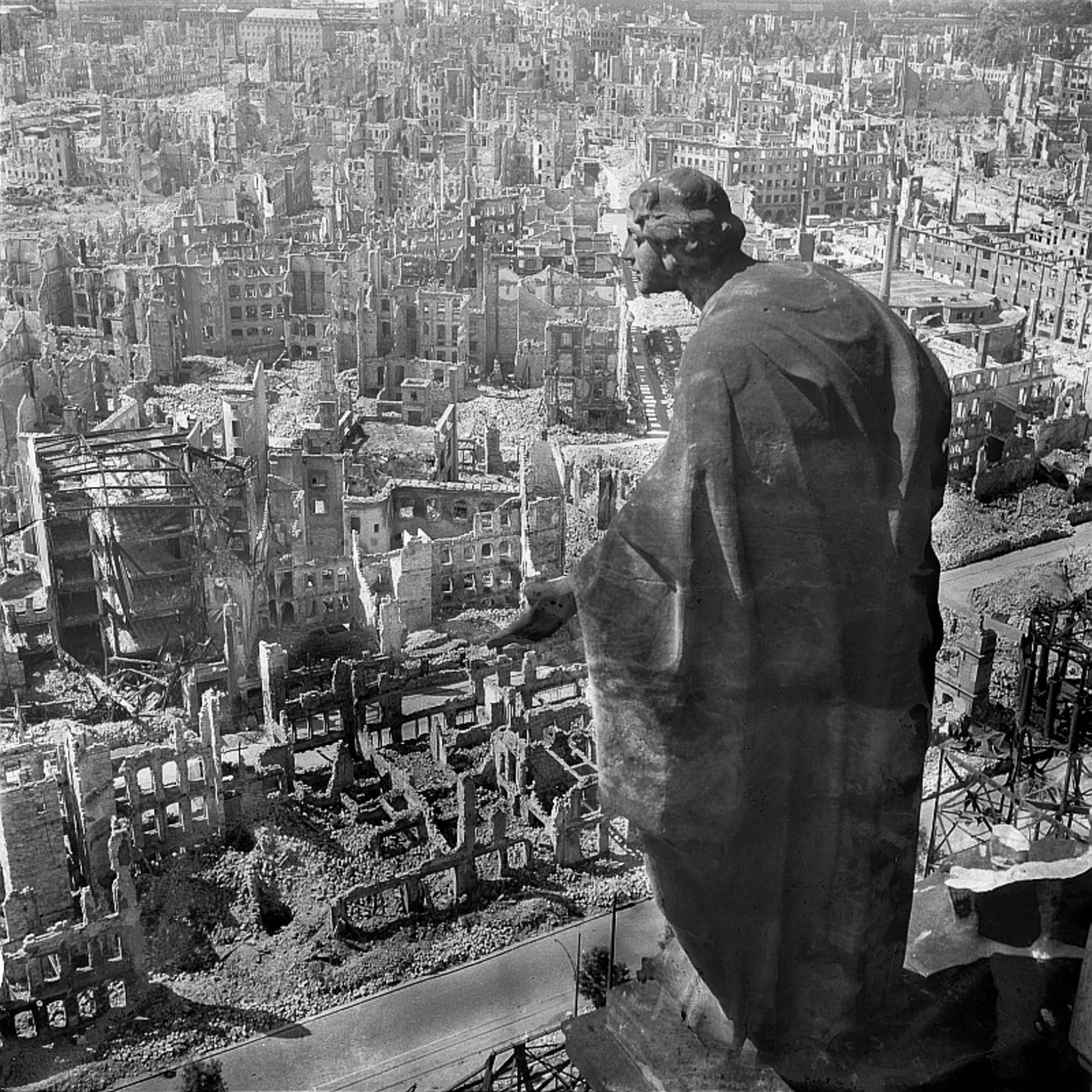
Destruction visible from the Rathaus ('townhall') in 1945

In four raids between 13 and 15 February 1945, 772 heavy bombers of the Royal Air Force (RAF) and 527 of the United States Army Air Forces (USAAF) dropped more than 3,900 tons of high-explosive bombs and incendiary devices on the German city of Dresden. (Note: The number of bombers and tonnage of bombs are taken from Angell (1953), a USAF document written in 1945 and classified secret until 1978. Taylor (2005) gives the figures 1,100 heavy bombers and 4,500 tons. Webster & Frankland (1994) give 805 Bomber Command aircraft 13 February 1945 and 1,646 US bombers 16 January – 17 April 1945.) The bombing and the resulting firestorm destroyed more than 1,600 acres (6.5 km^{2}) of the city centre. Up to 25,000 people were killed. (Note: Casualty figures have varied mainly due to false information spread by Nazi German and Soviet propaganda. Some figures from historians include: 18,000+ (but less than 25,000) from Antony Beevor in "The Second World War"; 20,000 from Anthony Roberts in "The Storm of War"; 25,000 from Ian Kershaw in "The End"; 25,000–30,000 from Michael Burleigh in "Moral Combat"; 35,000 from Richard J. Evans in "The Third Reich at War: 1939–1945".) Three more USAAF air raids followed, two occurring on 2 March aimed at the city's railway marshalling yard and one smaller raid on 17 April aimed at industrial areas.

Postwar discussions about whether the attacks were justified made the event a moral cause célèbre of the war. Nazi Germany's desperate struggle to maintain resistance in the closing months of the war is widely understood today, but Allied intelligence assessments at the time painted a different picture. There was uncertainty over whether the Soviets could sustain their advance on Germany, and rumours of the establishment of a Nazi redoubt in Southern Germany were taken too seriously.

The Allies saw the Dresden operation as the justified bombing of a strategic target, which USAAF reports, declassified decades later, noted as a major rail transport and communication centre, housing 110 factories and 50,000 workers supporting the German war effort. Several researchers later asserted that not all communications infrastructure was targeted, and neither were the extensive industrial areas located outside the city centre. Critics of the bombing argue that Dresden was a cultural landmark with little strategic significance, and that the attacks were indiscriminate area bombing and were not proportionate to military gains, thus amounting to a war crime.

The death toll of the bombing has been exaggerated by both Nazi and Soviet propaganda, with the post-war East German Communist government presenting it as an example of "Anglo-American barbarism". At the present time, the modern German far-right continues to occasionally refer to it as "Dresden's holocaust of bombs" (German: Bombenholocaust). In the decades following the war, large variations in the claimed death tolls have led to controversy, though the numbers themselves are no longer a major point of contention among historians. City authorities at the time estimated that there were as many as 25,000 victims, a figure that subsequent investigations supported, including a 2010 study commissioned by the city council. In March 1945, the German government ordered its press to publish a falsified casualty figure of 200,000, and death tolls as high as 500,000 have been claimed. These inflated figures were disseminated in the West for decades, notably by David Irving, a Holocaust denier.

== Background ==
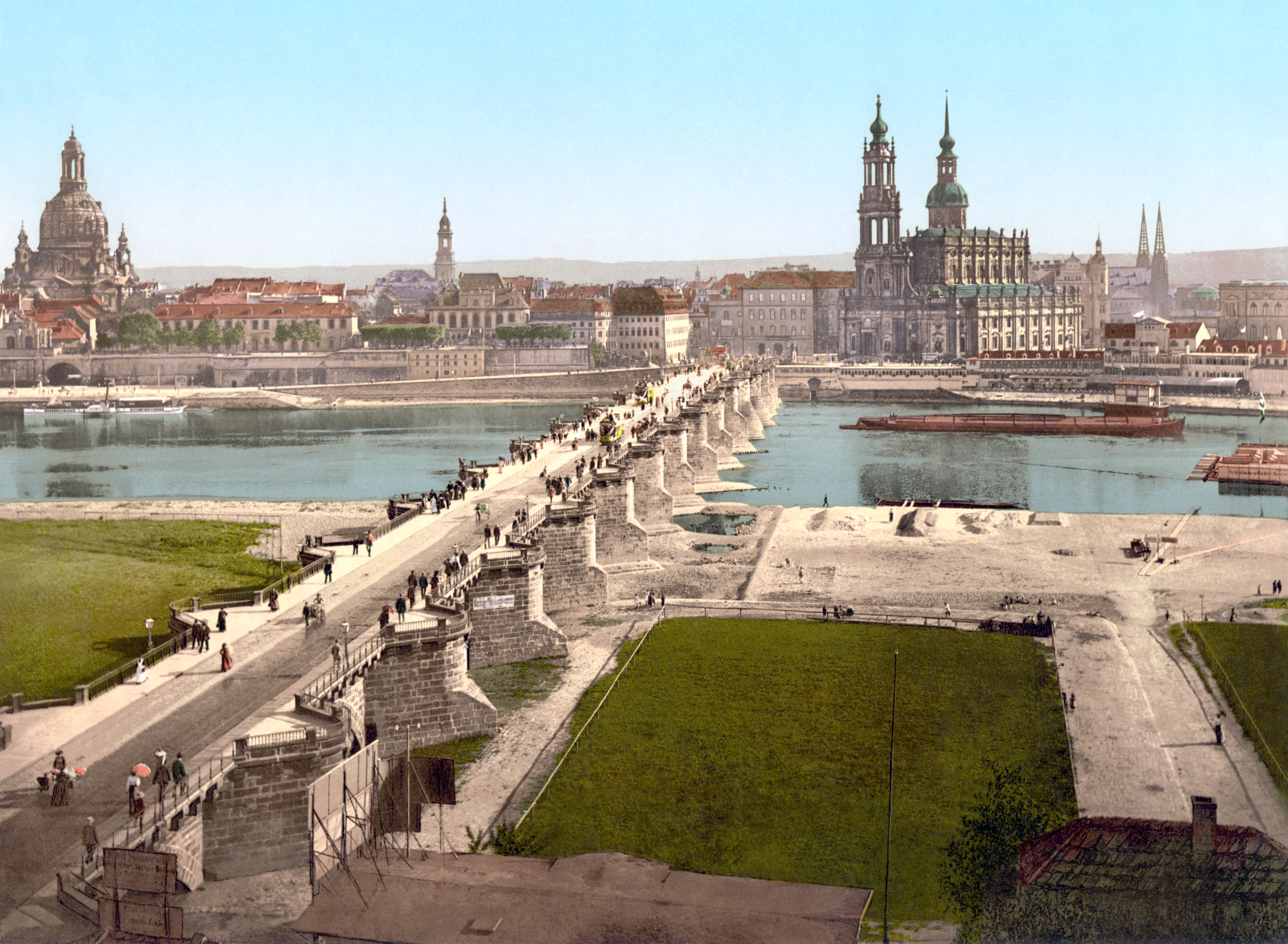
Colourised photograph of Dresden during the 1890s with the Frauenkirche, Augustus Bridge, and Katholische Hofkirche visible

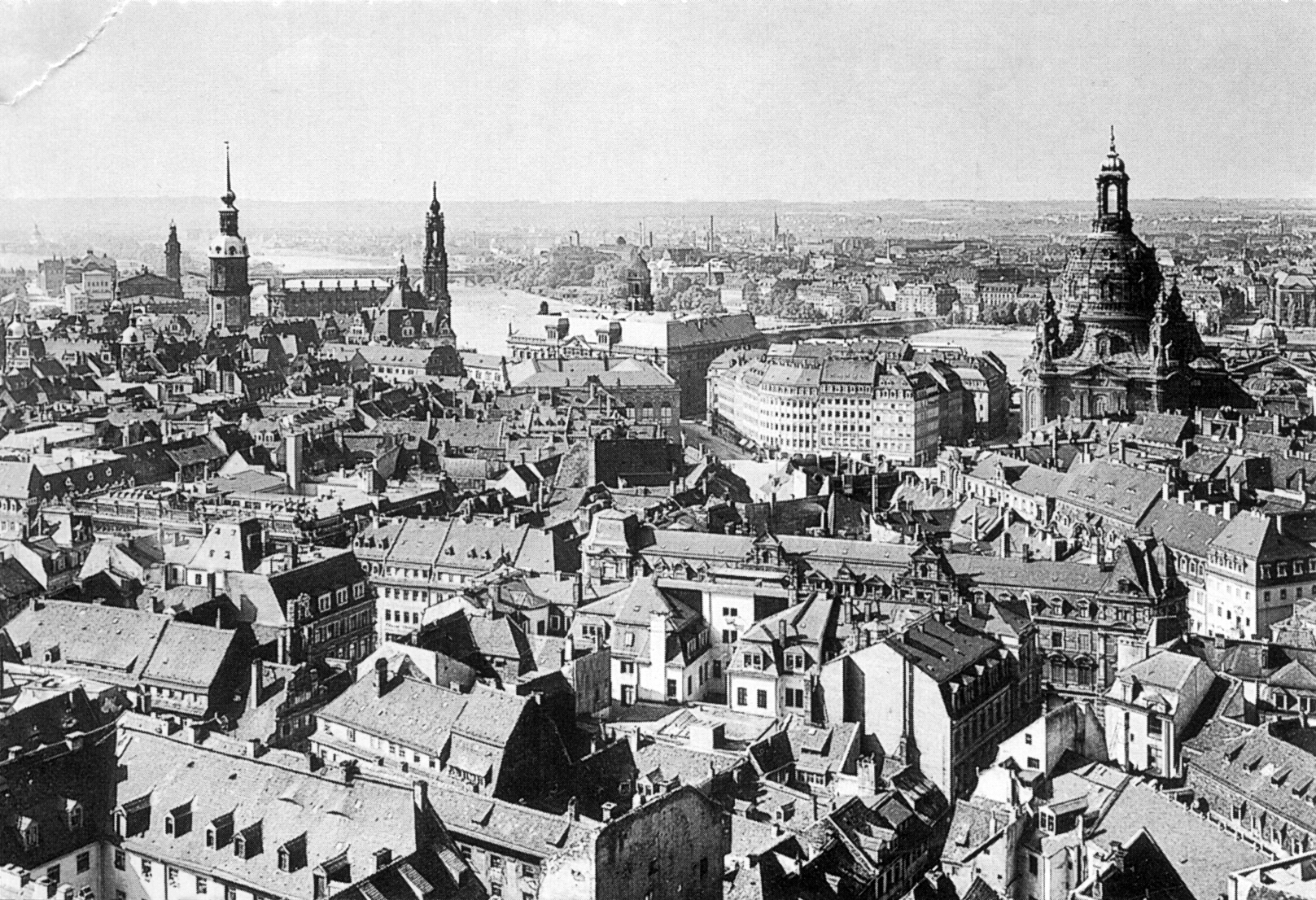
The Altstadt ('old town') in 1910 from the town hall

Early in 1945, the German offensive known as the Battle of the Bulge had been exhausted, as was the Luftwaffe's failed New Year's Day attack. The Red Army had launched its Silesian Offensives into pre-war German territory. The German army was retreating on all fronts, but still resisting. On 8 February 1945, the Red Army crossed the Oder River, with positions just 70 km (43 mi) from Berlin. A special British Joint Intelligence Subcommittee report, German Strategy and Capacity to Resist, prepared for Winston Churchill's eyes only, predicted that Germany might collapse as early as mid-April if the Soviets overran its eastern defences. Alternatively, the report warned that the Germans might hold out until November if they could prevent the Soviets from taking Silesia. Despite the postwar assessment, there were serious doubts in Allied intelligence as to how well the war was going for them, with fears of a "Nazi redoubt" being established, or of the Russian advance faltering. Hence, any assistance to the Soviets on the Eastern Front could shorten the war.

A large-scale aerial attack on Berlin and other eastern cities was considered under the code name Operation Thunderclap in mid-1944 but was shelved on 16 August. This was later reexamined, and the decision was made to pursue a more limited operation. The Soviet Army continued its push towards the Reich despite severe losses, which they sought to minimize in the final phase of the war. On 5 January 1945, two North American B-25 Mitchell bombers dropped 300,000 leaflets over Dresden with the "Appeal of 50 German generals to the German army and people".

On 22 January 1945, the RAF director of bomber operations, Air Commodore Sydney Bufton, sent Deputy Chief of the Air Staff Air Marshal Sir Norman Bottomley a minute suggesting that if Thunderclap was timed so that it appeared to be a coordinated air attack to aid the current Soviet offensive, then the effect of the bombing on German morale would be increased. On 25 January, the Joint Intelligence Committee supported the idea, as Ultra-based intelligence had indicated that dozens of German divisions deployed in the west were moving to reinforce the Eastern Front, and that interdiction of these troop movements should be a "high priority". Air Chief Marshal Sir Arthur Harris, AOC-in-C Bomber Command, nicknamed "Bomber Harris", was known as an ardent supporter of area bombing; when asked for his view, he proposed a simultaneous attack on Chemnitz, Leipzig and Dresden. That evening, Churchill asked the Secretary of State for Air, Sir Archibald Sinclair, what plans had been drawn up to carry out these proposals. Marshal of the Royal Air Force Sir Charles Portal, the Chief of the Air Staff, answered: "We should use available effort in one big attack on Berlin and attacks on Dresden, Leipzig, and Chemnitz, or any other cities where a severe blitz will not only cause confusion in the evacuation from the East, but will also hamper the movement of troops from the West." He mentioned that aircraft diverted to such raids should not be taken away from the current primary tasks of destroying oil production facilities, jet aircraft factories, and submarine yards.

Churchill was not satisfied with this answer and on 26 January pressed Sinclair for a plan of operations: "I asked [last night] whether Berlin, and no doubt other large cities in east Germany, should not now be considered especially attractive targets ... Pray, report to me tomorrow what is going to be done".

In response to Churchill's inquiry, Sinclair approached Bottomley, who asked Harris to undertake attacks on Berlin, Dresden, Leipzig, and Chemnitz as soon as moonlight and weather permitted, "with the particular object of exploiting the confused conditions which are likely to exist in the above-mentioned cities during the successful Russian advance". This allowed Sinclair to inform Churchill on 27 January of the Air Staff's agreement that, "subject to the overriding claims" on other targets under the Pointblank Directive, strikes against communications in these cities to disrupt civilian evacuation from the east and troop movement from the west would be made.

On 31 January, Bottomley sent Portal a message saying a heavy attack on Dresden and other cities "will cause great confusion in civilian evacuation from the east and hamper movement of reinforcements from other fronts". British historian Frederick Taylor mentions a further memo sent to the Chiefs of Staff Committee by Air Marshal Sir Douglas Evill on 1 February, in which Evill states interfering with mass civilian movements was a key factor in the decision to bomb the city centre. Attacking main railway junctions, telephone systems, city administration and utilities would result in "chaos". Britain had ostensibly learned this after the Coventry Blitz, when loss of this crucial infrastructure had supposedly longer-lasting effects than attacks on war plants.

During the Yalta Conference on 4 February, the Deputy Chief of the Soviet General Staff, General Aleksei Antonov, raised the issue of hampering the reinforcement of German troops from the Western Front by paralyzing the junctions of Berlin and Leipzig with aerial bombardment. In response, Portal, who was in Yalta, asked Bottomley to send him a list of objectives to discuss with the Soviets. Bottomley's list included oil plants, tank and aircraft factories and the cities of Berlin and Dresden. However, according to Richard Overy, the discussion with Antonov, recorded in the minutes, only mentions the bombing of Berlin and Leipzig. The bombing of Dresden was a Western plan, but the Soviets were told in advance about the operation.

An alternative account, by historian Martin Gilbert, is that Bletchley Park codebreaking had shown the Germans ordering large bodies of troops to move towards Breslau. When the Soviet Union were advised of this, they requested bombing raids to prevent this movement. This was received whilst Portal and Churchill were travelling to the Yalta conference. The raids were therefore authorised by Clement Attlee, the Deputy Prime Minister, and by Portal's deputy.

=== Military and industrial profile ===
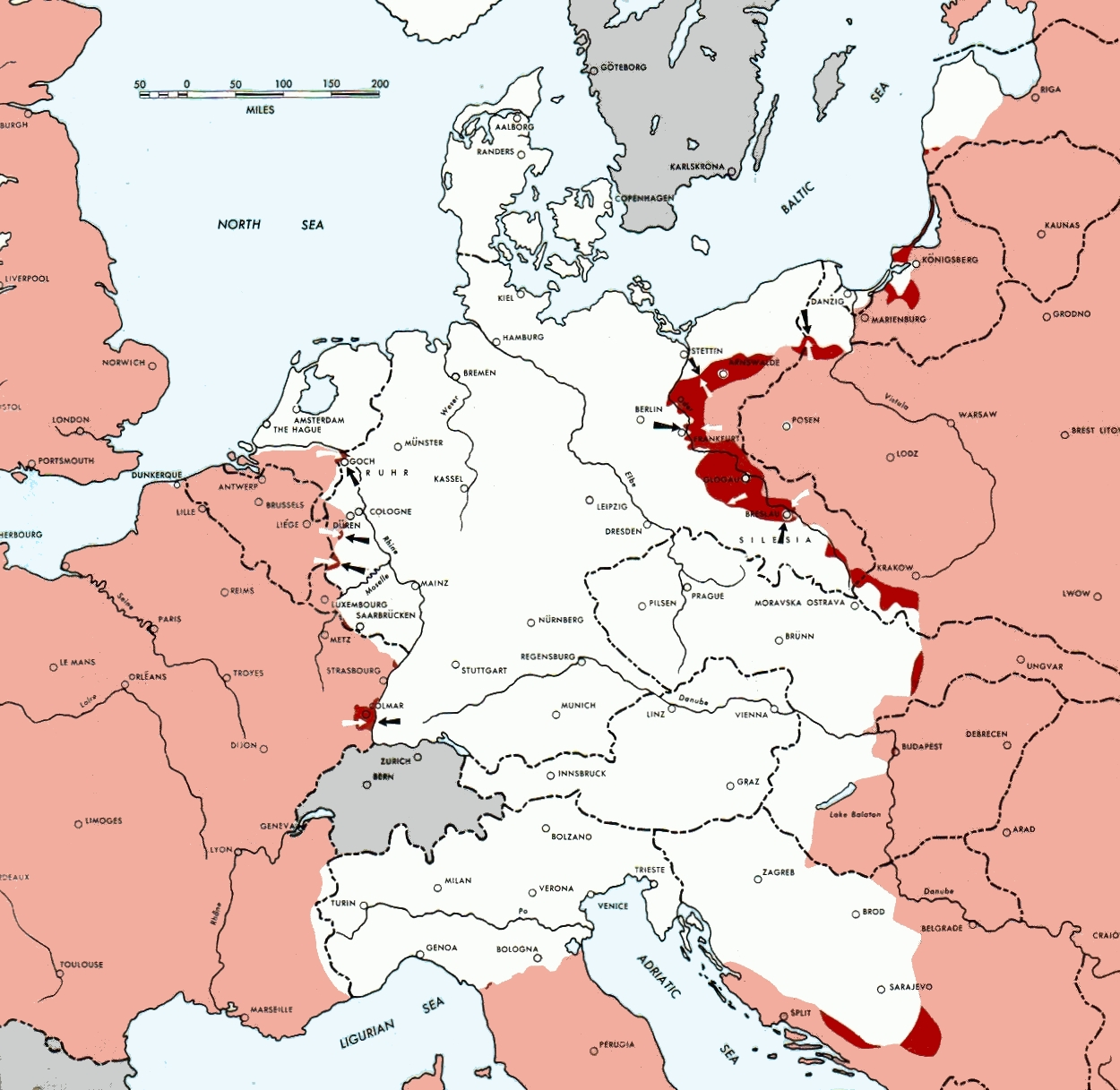
European front lines during Dresden raids. German controlled territory Allied territory Recent Allied advances Neutral

According to the RAF at the time, Dresden was Germany's seventh-largest city and the largest remaining unbombed, built-up area. Taylor writes that an official 1942 guide to the city described it as "one of the foremost industrial locations of the Reich", and in 1944, the German Army High Command's Weapons Office listed 127 medium-to-large factories and workshops that were supplying the army with matériel. Nonetheless, according to some historians, the contribution of Dresden to the German war effort may not have been as significant as the planners thought.

The US Air Force Historical Division wrote a report, which remained classified until December 1978, in response to international concern about the bombing. It said that there were 110 factories and 50,000 workers in the city supporting the German war effort at the time of the raid. According to the report, there were aircraft components factories; a poison gas factory (Chemische Fabrik Goye and Company); an anti-aircraft and field gun factory (Lehman); an optical goods factory (Zeiss Ikon AG); and factories producing electrical and X-ray apparatus (Koch & Sterzel AG); gears and differentials (Saxoniswerke); and electric gauges (Gebrüder Bassler). The report also mentioned barracks, hutted camps, and a munitions storage depot.

The USAF report also states that two of Dresden's traffic routes were of military importance: north–south from Germany to Czechoslovakia, and east–west along the central European uplands. The city was at the junction of the Berlin–Prague–Vienna railway line, as well as the Munich–Breslau, and Hamburg–Leipzig lines. Colonel Harold E. Cook, a US POW held in the Friedrichstadt marshaling yard the night before the attacks, later said that "I saw with my own eyes that Dresden was an armed camp: thousands of German troops, tanks and artillery and miles of freight cars loaded with supplies supporting and transporting German logistics towards the east to meet the Russians".

An RAF memo issued to airmen on the night of the attack gave some reasoning for the raid:

Dresden, the seventh largest city in Germany and not much smaller than Manchester is also the largest unbombed builtup area the enemy has got. In the midst of winter with refugees pouring westward and troops to be rested, roofs are at a premium, not only to give shelter to workers, refugees, and troops alike, but to house the administrative services displaced from other areas. At one time well known for its china, Dresden has developed into an industrial city of first-class importance ... The intentions of the attack are to hit the enemy where he will feel it most, behind an already partially collapsed front, to prevent the use of the city in the way of further advance, and incidentally to show the Russians when they arrive what Bomber Command can do.

In the raid, major industrial areas in the suburbs, which stretched for miles, were not targeted. According to historian Donald Miller, "the economic disruption would have been far greater had Bomber Command targeted the suburban areas where most of Dresden's manufacturing might was concentrated".

In his biography of Attlee and Churchill, Leo McKinstry wrote:

When Churchill arrived at Yalta on 4 February 1945, the first question that Stalin put to him was: 'Why haven't you bombed Dresden?' His enquiry reflected the importance that the Soviet Union attached to an attack on the city, following intelligence reports that Germany was moving large numbers of troops towards the Breslau Front. Churchill assured Stalin that an Allied attack was imminent.

== The attacks ==
=== Night of 13/14 February ===
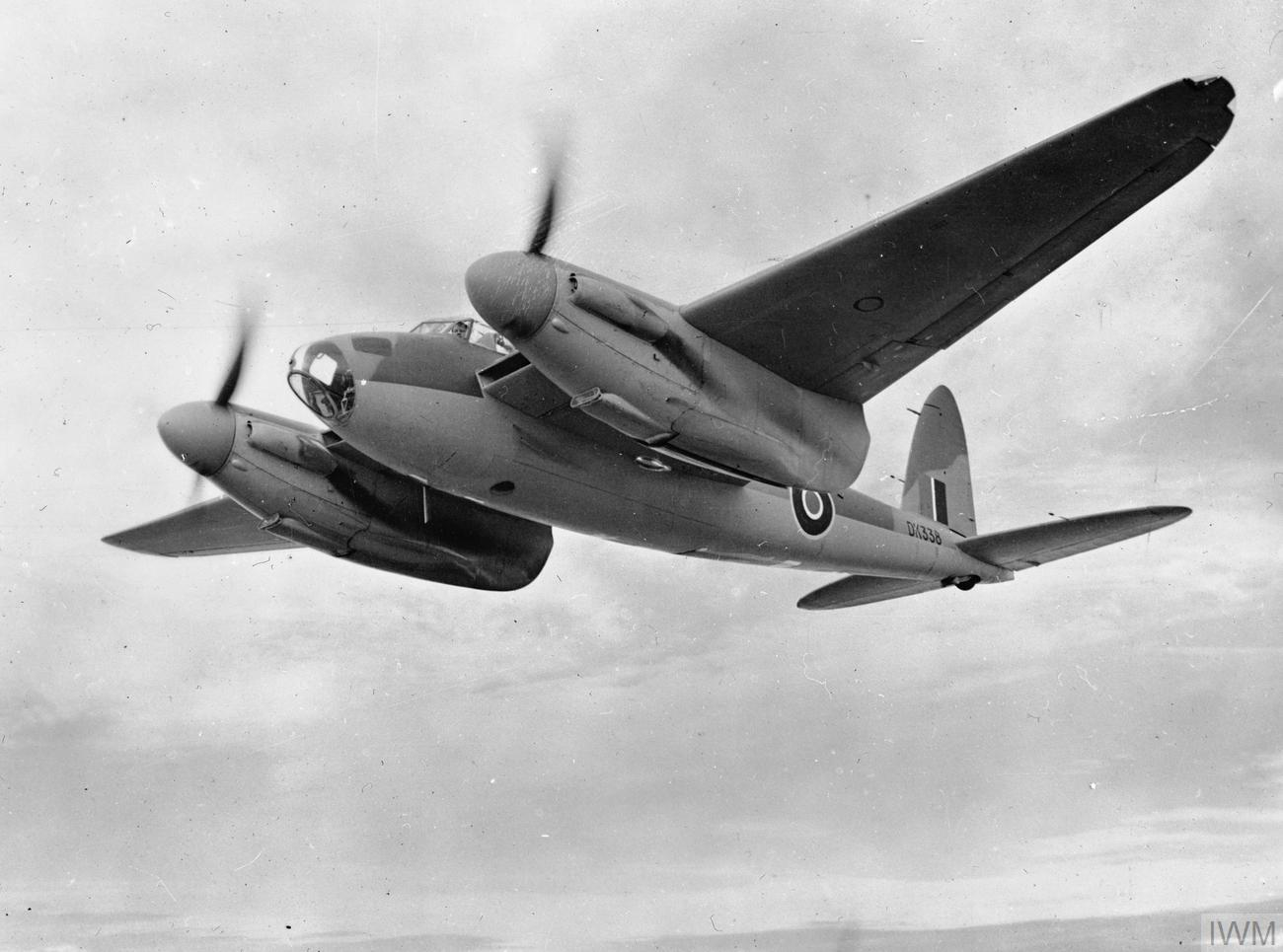
Mosquito marker aircraft dropped target indicators, which glowed red and green to guide the bomber stream.

The Dresden attack was to have begun with a USAAF Eighth Air Force bombing raid on 13 February 1945. The Eighth Air Force had already bombed the railway yards near the centre of the city twice in daytime raids: once on 7 October 1944 with 70 tons of high-explosive bombs killing more than 400, then again with 133 bombers on 16 January 1945, dropping 279 tons of high-explosives and 41 tons of incendiaries.

On 13 February 1945, bad weather over Europe prevented any USAAF operations, and it was left to RAF Bomber Command to carry out the first raid. It had been decided that the raid would be a double strike, in which a second wave of bombers would attack three hours after the first, just as the rescue teams were trying to put out the fires. As was standard practice, other raids were carried out that night to confuse German air defences. Three hundred and sixty heavy bombers (Lancasters and Halifaxes) bombed a synthetic oil plant in Böhlen, 60 mi (97 km) from Dresden, while 71 de Havilland Mosquito medium bombers attacked Magdeburg with small numbers of Mosquitos carrying out nuisance raids on Bonn and Misburg, near Hanover and Nuremberg.

When Polish crews of the designated squadrons were preparing for the mission, the terms of the Yalta agreement were made known to them. There was a huge uproar, since the Yalta agreement handed parts of Poland over to the Soviet Union. There was talk of mutiny among the Polish pilots, and their British officers removed their side arms. The Polish government ordered the pilots to follow their orders and fly their missions over Dresden, which they did.

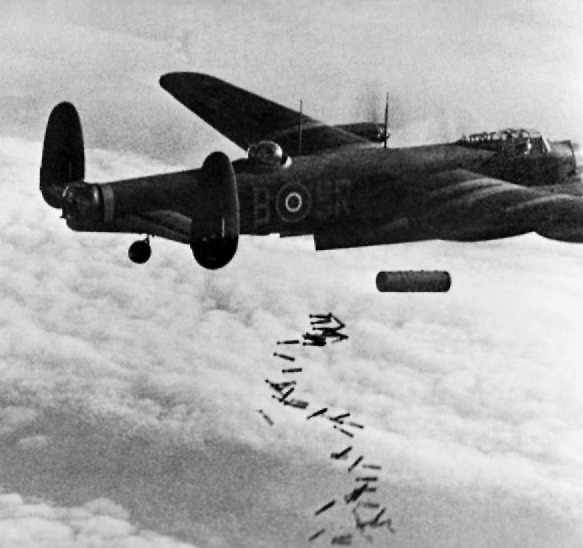
A Lancaster bomber releases a 4,000 lb (1,800 kg) HC "cookie" and 108 30 lb (14 kg) "J" incendiaries over Duisburg 1944.

The first of the British aircraft took off at around 17:20 hours CET for the 700-mile (1,100 km) journey. (Note: All raid times are CET; Britain was on double summer time in early 1945, which was the same time as CET.) This was a group of Lancasters from Bomber Command's 83 Squadron, No. 5 Group, acting as the Pathfinders, or flare force, whose job it was to find Dresden and drop magnesium parachute flares, known to the Germans as "Christmas trees", to mark and light up Dresden for the aircraft that would mark the target itself. The next set of aircraft to leave England were twin-engined Mosquito marker planes, which would identify target areas and drop 1,000-pound (450 kg) target indicators (TIs) that marked the target for the bombers to aim at. The attack was to centre on the Ostragehege sports stadium, next to the city's medieval Altstadt (old town), with its congested and highly combustible timbered buildings.

The main bomber force, called Plate Rack, took off shortly after the Pathfinders. This group of 254 Lancasters carried 500 tons of high explosives and 375 tons of incendiaries ("firebombs"). There were 200,000 incendiaries in all, with the high-explosive bombs ranging in weight from 500 to 4,000 lb (230 to 1,810 kg) – the two-ton "cookies", also known as blockbusters because they could destroy an entire large building or street. The high explosives were intended to rupture water mains and blow off roofs, doors, and windows to expose the interiors of the buildings and create an air flow to feed the fires caused by the incendiaries that followed.

The Lancasters crossed into France near the Somme, then into Germany just north of Cologne. At 22:00 hours, the force heading for Böhlen split away from Plate Rack, which turned south-east toward the Elbe. By this time, ten of the Lancasters were out of service, leaving 244 to continue to Dresden.

The sirens started sounding in Dresden at 21:51 (CET). (Note: During the Second World War, Britain was on summer time and double summer time or UTC+01:00 and UTC+02:00, the same as CET and CET+01:00.) The 'Master Bomber' Wing Commander Maurice Smith, flying in a Mosquito, gave the order to the Lancasters: "Controller to Plate Rack Force: Come in and bomb glow of red target indicators as planned. Bomb the glow of red TIs as planned".

In the first attack, the first bombs were released at 22:13, the last at 22:28. The Lancasters delivered 881.1 tons of bombs, of which 57% were high explosive and 43% incendiary. The fan-shaped area that was bombed was 1.25 mi (2.01 km) long, and at its extreme about 1.75 mi (2.82 km) wide. The shape and total devastation of the area was created by the bombers of No. 5 Group flying over the head of the fan (Ostragehege stadium) on prearranged compass bearings and releasing their bombs at different prearranged times.

The second attack, three hours later, was by Lancaster aircraft of 1, 3, 6 and 8 Groups, 8 Group being the Pathfinders. By now, the thousands of fires from the burning city could be seen more than 60 mi (97 km) away on the ground. From the air, the second wave of bombers sighted the fires from a distance of over 90 mi (140 km). The Pathfinders therefore decided to expand the target, dropping flares on either side of the firestorm, including the Hauptbahnhof, the main train station, and the Großer Garten, a large park, both undamaged by the first raid. The German sirens sounded again at 01:05, but these were small handheld sirens that were heard within only a block. Between 01:21 and 01:45, 529 Lancasters dropped more than 1,800 tons of bombs.

=== 14–15 February ===
On the morning of 14 February, 431 United States Army Air Force bombers of the Eighth Air Force's 1st Bombardment Division were scheduled to bomb Dresden near midday, and the 457 aircraft of 3rd Bombardment Division were to follow to bomb Chemnitz, while the 375 bombers of the 2nd Bombardment Division would bomb a synthetic oil plant in Magdeburg. Another 84 bombers would attack Wesel. The bomber groups were protected by 784 North American P-51 Mustangs of the Eighth Air Force's VIII Fighter Command, 316 of which covered the Dresden attack – a total of almost 2,100 Eighth Army Air Force aircraft over Saxony during 14 February. The smoke plume over Dresden by now reached 15,000 ft (4,600 m) and was plainly visible to the approaching raid.

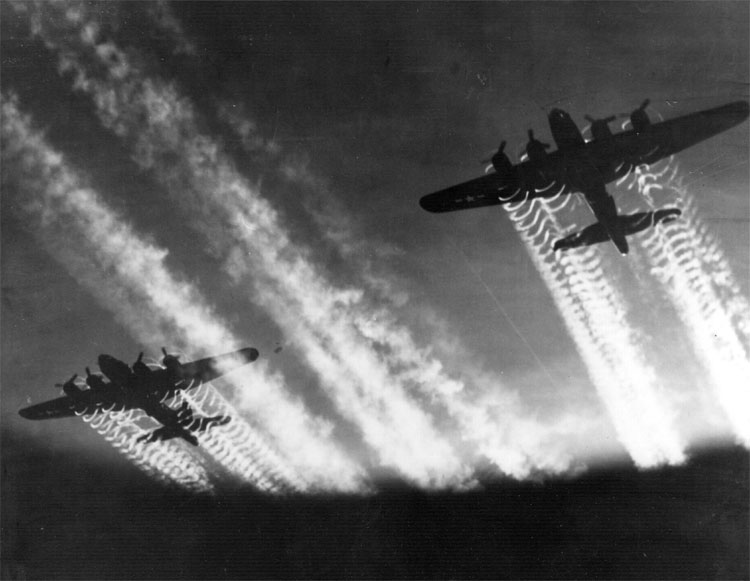
USAAF Boeing B-17 Flying Fortress bombers over Europe

Primary sources disagree as to whether the aiming point was the marshalling yards near the centre of the city or the centre of the built-up urban area. The report by the 1st Bombardment Division's commander to his commander states that the targeting sequence was the centre of the built-up area in Dresden if the weather was clear. If clouds obscured Dresden but Chemnitz was clear, Chemnitz would be targeted. If both were obscured, they were to bomb the centre of Dresden using H2X radar. The mix of bombs for the Dresden raid was about 40 per cent incendiaries—much closer to the RAF city-busting mix than the USAAF usually used in precision bombardment. Taylor compares this 40 per cent mix with the raid on Berlin on 3 February, where the ratio was 10 per cent incendiaries. This was a common mix when the USAAF anticipated cloudy conditions over the target.

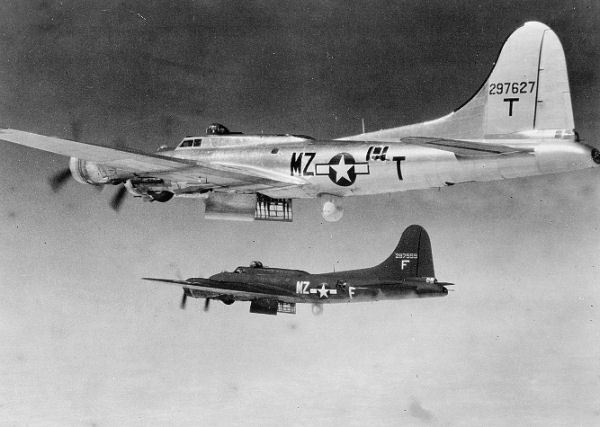
B-17s similar to some of the Dresden raiders, with H2X radars extended from the belly where a turret would normally have been. Other B-17s relied on signals from those with radar.

Three hundred sixteen B-17 Flying Fortresses bombed Dresden, dropping 771 tons of bombs. The remaining 115 bombers from the stream of 431 misidentified their targets. Sixty bombed Prague, dropping 153 tons of bombs, while others bombed Brüx and Pilsen. The 379th bombardment group started to bomb Dresden at 12:17, aiming at marshalling yards in the Friedrichstadt district west of the city centre, as the area was unobscured by smoke or cloud. The 303rd group arrived over Dresden two minutes after the 379th and found their view obscured by clouds, so they bombed Dresden using H2X radar. The groups that followed the 303rd (92nd, 306th, 379th, 384th and 457th) also found Dresden obscured by clouds, and they too used H2X. H2X aiming caused the groups to bomb with a wide dispersal over the Dresden area. The last group to attack Dresden was the 306th, and they finished by 12:30.

No evidence of strafing of civilians has ever been found, although a March 1945 article in the Nazi-run weekly newspaper Das Reich claimed this had occurred. (Note: Civilian strafing was a regular practice of the Luftwaffe throughout the war.) Historian Götz Bergander, an eyewitness to the raids, found no reports on strafing for 13–15 February by any pilots or the German military and police. He asserted in Dresden im Luftkrieg (1977) that only a few tales of civilians being strafed were reliable in detail, and all were related to the daylight attack on 14 February. He concluded that some memory of eyewitnesses was real, but that it had misinterpreted the firing in a dogfight as deliberately aimed at people on the ground. In 2000, historian Helmut Schnatz found an explicit order to RAF pilots not to strafe civilians on the way back from Dresden. He also reconstructed timelines with the result that strafing would have been almost impossible due to lack of time and fuel. Frederick Taylor in Dresden (2004), basing most of his analysis on the work of Bergander and Schnatz, concludes that no strafing took place, although some stray bullets from aerial dogfights may have hit the ground and been mistaken for strafing by those in the vicinity. The official historical commission collected 103 detailed eyewitness accounts and let the local bomb disposal services search according to their assertions. They found no bullets or fragments that would have been used by planes of the Dresden raids.

On 15 February, the 1st Bombardment Division's primary target—the Böhlen synthetic oil plant near Leipzig—was obscured by clouds, so its groups diverted to their secondary target, Dresden. Dresden was also obscured by clouds, so the groups targeted the city using H2X. The first group to arrive over the target was the 401st, but it missed the city centre and bombed Dresden's southeastern suburbs, with bombs also landing on the nearby towns of Meissen and Pirna. The other groups all bombed Dresden between 12:00 and 12:10. They failed to hit the marshalling yards in the Friedrichstadt district and, as in the previous raid, ordnance was scattered over a wide area. Railroad operations at Dresden resumed within three days.

=== German defensive action ===
Dresden's air defences had been depleted as anti-aircraft guns were requisitioned for use against the Red Army in the east, and the city lost its last massive flak battery in January 1945. The Luftwaffe was largely ineffective, with planes that were unsafe to fly due to lack of parts and maintenance and a critical shortage of aviation fuel. The German radar system was also degraded, lowering the warning time to prepare for air attacks. The RAF also had an advantage over the Germans in the field of electronic radar countermeasures. The lack of opposition meant that, unlike defended targets, where typically only 40% of bombs were dropped within the target area, in this case, every bomb fell within the city.

Of 796 British bombers that participated, six were lost, three of those hit by bombs dropped by aircraft flying over them. The following day, only a single US bomber was shot down, as the large escort force was able to prevent Luftwaffe day fighters from disrupting the attack.

=== On the ground ===
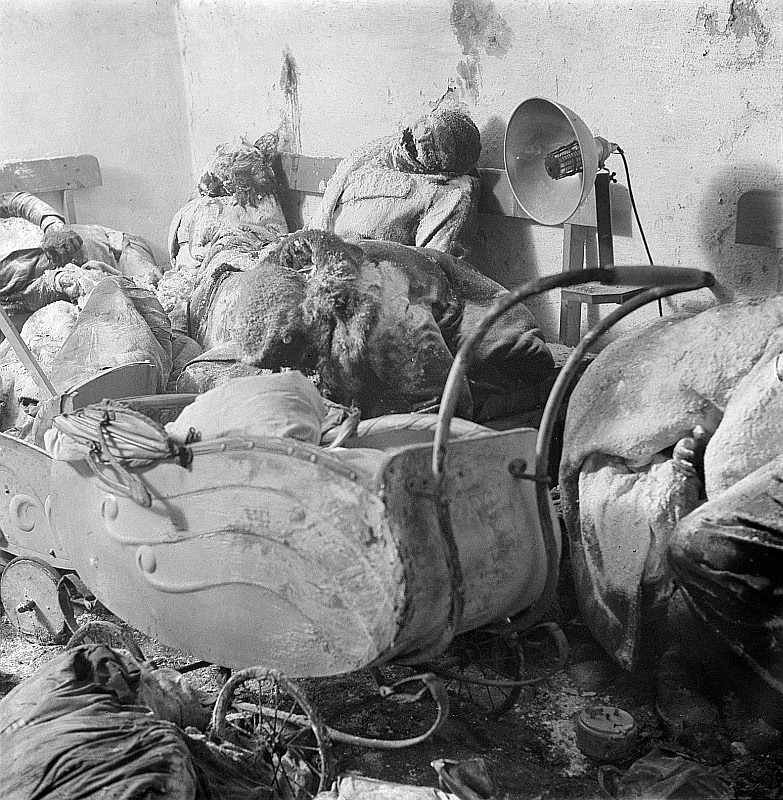
Bodies, including a mother and children

"It is not possible to describe! Explosion after explosion. It was beyond belief, worse than the blackest nightmare. So many people were horribly burnt and injured. It became more and more difficult to breathe. It was dark and all of us tried to leave this cellar with inconceivable panic. Dead and dying people were trampled upon, luggage was left or snatched up out of our hands by rescuers. The basket with our twins covered with wet cloths was snatched up out of my mother's hands and we were pushed upstairs by the people behind us. We saw the burning street, the falling ruins and the terrible firestorm. My mother covered us with wet blankets and coats she found in a water tub."

"We saw terrible things: cremated adults shrunk to the size of small children, pieces of arms and legs, dead people, whole families burnt to death, burning people ran to and fro, burnt coaches filled with civilian refugees, dead rescuers and soldiers, many were calling and looking for their children and families, and fire everywhere, everywhere fire, and all the time the hot wind of the firestorm threw people back into the burning houses they were trying to escape from."

"I cannot forget these terrible details. I can never forget them."

— Lothar Metzger, survivor.

The sirens started sounding in Dresden at 21:51 (CET). Frederick Taylor writes that the Germans could see that a large enemy bomber formation—or what they called "ein dicker Hund" (lit: a fat dog, a "major thing")—was approaching somewhere in the east. At 21:39, the Reich Air Defence Leadership issued an enemy aircraft warning for Dresden, although at that point, it was thought Leipzig might be the target. At 21:59, the Local Air Raid Leadership confirmed that the bombers were in the area of Dresden-Pirna. Taylor writes the city was largely undefended; a night fighter force of ten Messerschmitt Bf 110Gs at Klotzsche airfield was scrambled, but it took them half an hour to get into an attack position. At 22:03, the Local Air Raid Leadership issued the first definitive warning: "Warning! Warning! Warning! The lead aircraft of the major enemy bomber forces have changed course and are now approaching the city area". Some 10,000 fled to the great open space of the Großer Garten, the royal park of Dresden, nearly 1.5 square miles (3.9 km^{2}) in all. Here, they were caught by the second raid, which started without an air-raid warning, at 1:22 a.m. At 11:30 a.m., the third wave of bombers, the two hundred and eleven American Flying Fortresses, began their attack.

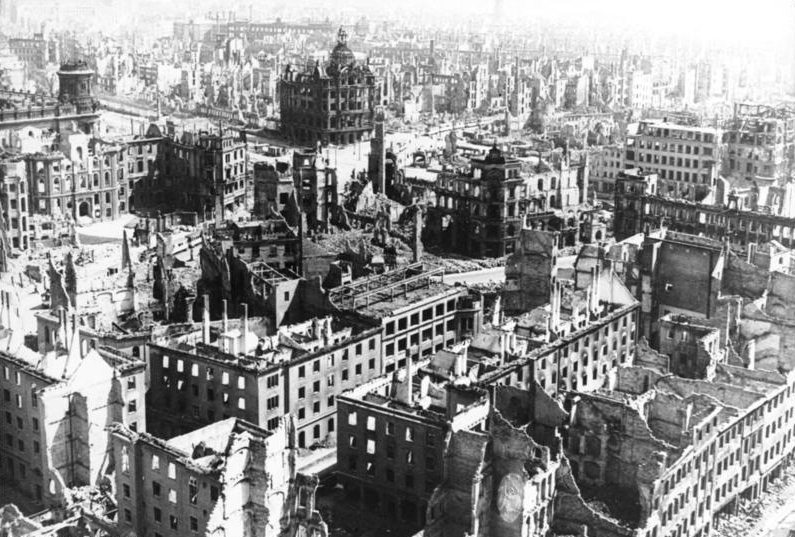
Over ninety per cent of the city centre was destroyed.

To my left I suddenly see a woman. I can see her to this day and shall never forget it. She carries a bundle in her arms. It is a baby. She runs, she falls, and the child flies in an arc into the fire.

Suddenly, I saw people again, right in front of me. They scream and gesticulate with their hands, and then—to my utter horror and amazement—I see how one after the other they simply seem to let themselves drop to the ground. (Today I know that these unfortunate people were the victims of lack of oxygen.) They fainted and then burnt to cinders.

Insane fear grips me and from then on I repeat one simple sentence to myself continuously: "I don't want to burn to death". I do not know how many people I fell over. I know only one thing: that I must not burn.

— Margaret Freyer, survivor.

Suddenly, the sirens stopped. Then flares filled the night sky with blinding light, dripping burning phosphorus onto the streets and buildings. It was then that we realized we were trapped in a locked cage that stood every chance of becoming a mass grave.

— Victor Gregg, British POW, survivor.

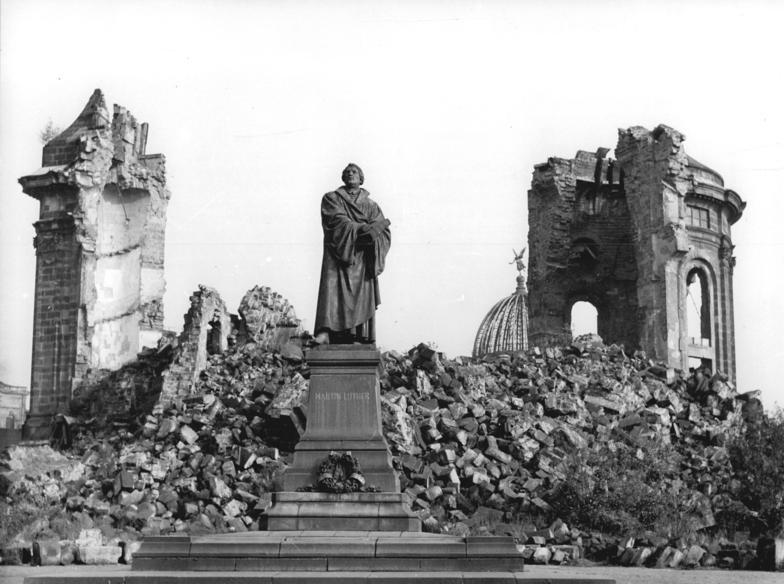
Statue of Martin Luther with ruined Frauenkirche

There were few public air raid shelters. The largest, beneath the main railway station, housed 6,000 refugees. As a result, most people took shelter in cellars, but one of the air raid precautions the city had taken was to remove thick cellar walls between rows of buildings and replace them with thin partitions that could be knocked through in an emergency. The idea was that, as one building collapsed or filled with smoke, those sheltering in the basements could knock walls down and move into adjoining buildings. With the city on fire everywhere, those fleeing from one burning cellar simply ran into another, with the result that thousands of bodies were found piled up in houses at the ends of city blocks. A Dresden police report written shortly after the attacks reported that the old town and the inner eastern suburbs had been engulfed in a single fire that had destroyed almost 12,000 dwellings. The same report said that the raids had destroyed the Wehrmacht's main command post in the Taschenbergpalais, 63 administration buildings, the railways, 19 military hospitals, 19 ships and barges, and a number of less significant military facilities. The destruction also encompassed 640 shops, 64 warehouses, 39 schools, 31 stores, 31 large hotels, 26 public houses/bars, 26 insurance buildings, 24 banks, 19 postal facilities, 19 hospitals and private clinics including auxiliary, overflow hospitals, 18 cinemas, 11 churches and six chapels, five consulates, four tram facilities, three theatres, two market halls, the zoo, the waterworks, and five other cultural buildings. Almost 200 factories were damaged, 136 seriously (including several of the Zeiss Ikon precision optical engineering works), 28 with medium to serious damage, and 35 with light damage.

An RAF assessment showed that 23 per cent of the industrial buildings and 56 per cent of the non-industrial buildings, not counting residential buildings, had been seriously damaged. Around 78,000 dwellings had been completely destroyed; 27,700 were uninhabitable, and 64,500 damaged but readily repairable.

During his postwar interrogation, Albert Speer, Reich Minister of Armaments and War Production, said that Dresden's industrial recovery from the bombings was rapid.

=== Fatalities ===
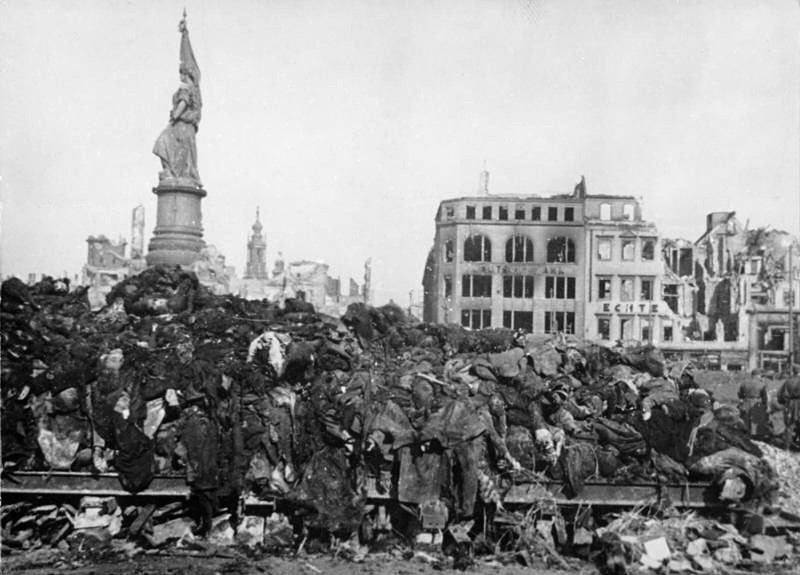
Bodies awaiting cremation

According to the official German report Tagesbefehl ('order of the day') no. 47 ("TB47") issued on 22 March, the number of dead recovered by that date was 20,204, including 6,865 who were cremated on the Altmarkt square, and they expected the total number of deaths to be about 25,000. Another report on 3 April put the number of corpses recovered at 22,096. Three municipal and 17 rural cemeteries outside Dresden recorded up to 30 April 1945 a total of at least 21,895 buried bodies from the Dresden raids, including those cremated on the Altmarkt.

Between 100,000 and 200,000 refugees fleeing westward from advancing Soviet forces were in the city at the time of the bombing. Exact figures are unknown, but reliable estimates were calculated based on train arrivals, foot traffic, and the extent to which emergency accommodation had to be organised. The city authorities did not distinguish between residents and refugees when establishing casualty numbers and "took great pains to count all the dead, identified and unidentified". This was largely achievable because most of the dead succumbed to suffocation; in only four places were recovered remains so badly burned that it was impossible to ascertain the number of victims. The uncertainty this introduced is thought to amount to no more than 100 people. About 35,000 people were registered with the authorities as missing after the raids, around 10,000 were later found alive.

A further 1,858 bodies were discovered during the reconstruction of Dresden between the end of the war and 1966. Since 1989, despite extensive excavation for new buildings, no new war-related bodies have been found. Seeking to establish a definitive casualty figure, in part to address propagandisation of the bombing by far-right groups, the Dresden city council in 2005 authorised an independent commission of historians (Historikerkommission) to conduct a new, thorough investigation, collecting and evaluating available sources. The results were published in 2010 and stated that between 22,700 and 25,000 people had been killed.

== Wartime political responses ==
=== German ===
Development of a German political response to the raid took several turns. Initially, some of the leadership, especially Robert Ley and Joseph Goebbels, wanted to use the raid as a pretext for abandonment of the Geneva Conventions on the Western Front. In the end, the only political action the German government took was to exploit the bombing for propaganda purposes. Goebbels is reported to have wept with rage for twenty minutes after he heard the news of the catastrophe, before launching into a bitter attack on Hermann Göring, the commander of the Luftwaffe: "If I had the power I would drag this cowardly good-for-nothing, this Reich marshal, before a court. ... How much guilt does this parasite not bear for all this, which we owe to his indolence and love of his own comforts. ...". On 16 February, the Propaganda Ministry issued a press release that claimed that Dresden had no war industries; it was a city of culture. On 25 February, a new leaflet with photographs of two burned children was released under the title "Dresden—Massacre of Refugees", stating that 200,000 had died. Since no official estimate had been developed, the numbers were speculative, but newspapers such as the Stockholm Svenska Morgonbladet used phrases such as "privately from Berlin", to explain where they had obtained the figures. Frederick Taylor states that "there is good reason to believe that later in March copies of—or extracts from—[an official police report] were leaked to the neutral press by Goebbels's Propaganda Ministry ... doctored with an extra zero to increase [the total dead from the raid] to 202,040". On 4 March, Das Reich, a weekly newspaper founded by Goebbels, published a lengthy article emphasising the suffering and destruction of a cultural icon, without mentioning damage to the German war effort.

Taylor writes that this propaganda was effective, as it not only influenced attitudes in neutral countries at the time, but also reached the House of Commons, when Richard Stokes, a Labour Member of Parliament, and a long-term opponent of area bombing, quoted information from the German Press Agency (controlled by the Propaganda Ministry). It was Stokes's questions in the House of Commons that were in large part responsible for the shift in British opinion against this type of raid. Taylor suggests that, although the destruction of Dresden would have affected people's support for the Allies regardless of German propaganda, at least some of the outrage did depend on Goebbels' falsification of the casualty figures.

=== British ===
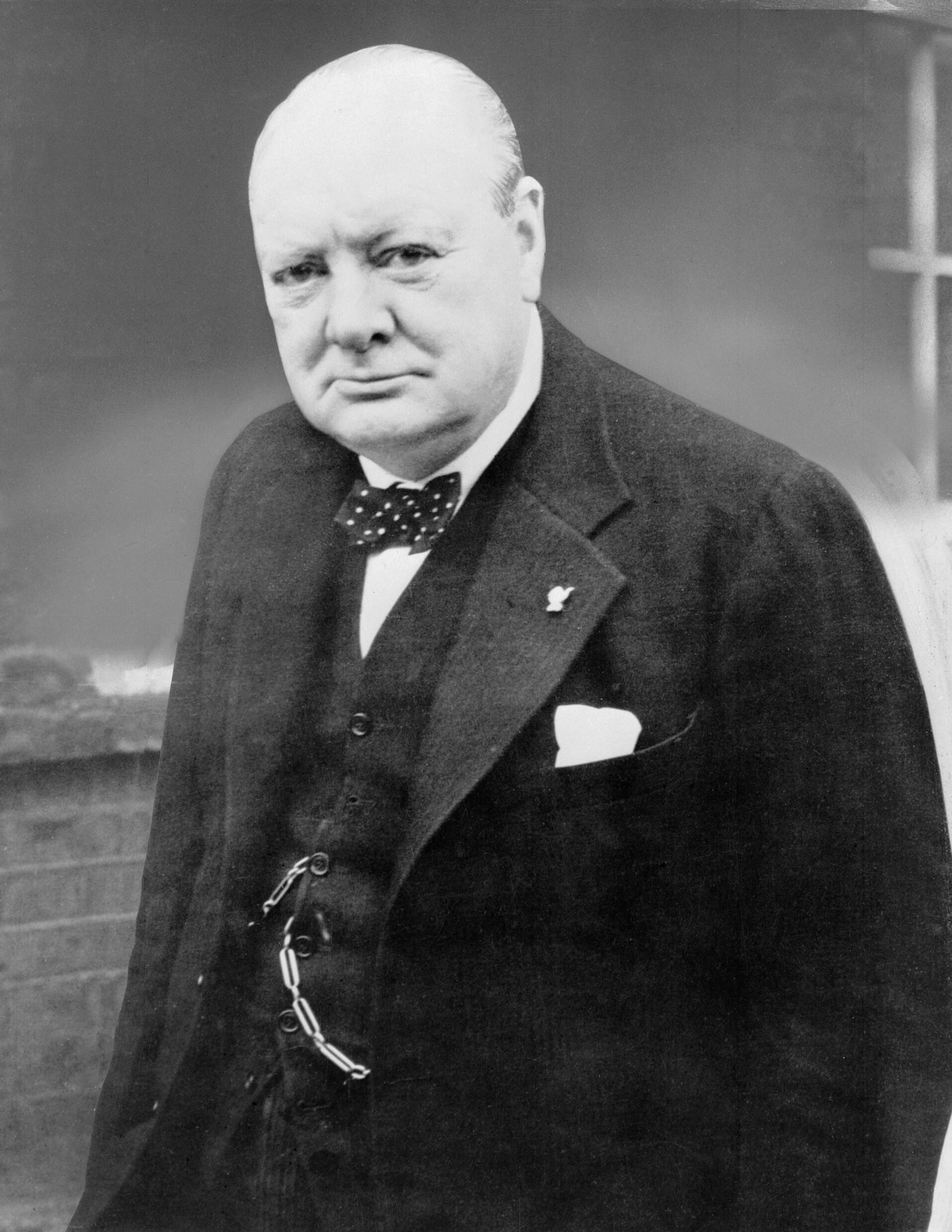
Churchill, who after Dresden spoke of fewer attacks affecting civilians

The destruction of the city provoked unease in intellectual circles in Britain. According to Max Hastings, by February 1945, attacks upon German cities had become largely irrelevant to the outcome of the war and the name of Dresden resonated with cultured people all over Europe—"the home of so much charm and beauty, a refuge for Trollope's heroines, a landmark of the Grand Tour." He writes that the bombing was the first time the public in Allied countries seriously questioned the military actions used to defeat the Germans.

The unease was made worse by an Associated Press story that the Allies had resorted to terror bombing. At a press briefing held by the Supreme Headquarters Allied Expeditionary Force two days after the raids, British Air Commodore Colin McKay Grierson told journalists:

First of all they (Dresden and similar towns) are the centres to which evacuees are being moved. They are centres of communications through which traffic is moving across to the Russian Front, and from the Western Front to the East, and they are sufficiently close to the Russian Front for the Russians to continue the successful prosecution of their battle. I think these three reasons probably cover the bombing.

One of the journalists asked whether the principal aim of bombing Dresden would be to cause confusion among the refugees or to blast communications carrying military supplies. Grierson answered that the primary aim was to attack communications to prevent the Germans from moving military supplies, and to stop movement in all directions if possible. He then added in an offhand remark that the raid also helped destroy "what is left of German morale". Howard Cowan, an Associated Press war correspondent, subsequently filed a story claiming that the Allies had resorted to terror bombing. There were follow-up newspaper editorials on the issue and Richard Stokes MP, longtime opponent of strategic bombing, asked questions in the House of Commons on 6 March.

Churchill subsequently re-evaluated the goals of the bombing campaigns, to focus less on strategic targets, and more toward targets of tactical significance. On 28 March, in a draft of a memo for General Ismay and the British Chiefs of Staff and the Chief of the Air Staff, he wrote:

It seems to me that the moment has come when the question of bombing of German cities simply for the sake of increasing the terror, though under other pretexts, should be reviewed. Otherwise we shall come into control of an utterly ruined land ... The destruction of Dresden remains a serious query against the conduct of Allied bombing. I am of the opinion that military objectives must henceforward be more strictly studied in our own interests than that of the enemy.

The Foreign Secretary has spoken to me on this subject, and I feel the need for more precise concentration upon military objectives such as oil and communications behind the immediate battle-zone, rather than on mere acts of terror and wanton destruction, however impressive.

However, in the actual memorandum, Churchill removed references to the increasing of terror as an aim for political reasons, writing:

It seems to me that the moment has come when the question of the so called "area bombing" of German cities should be reviewed from the point of view of our own interests. If we come into control of an entirely ruined land, there will be a great shortage of accommodation for ourselves and our Allies: and we shall be unable to get housing materials out of Germany for our own needs because some temporary provision would have to be made for the Germans themselves. We must see to it that our attacks do not do more harm to ourselves in the long run than they do to the enemy's immediate war effort. Pray let me have your views.

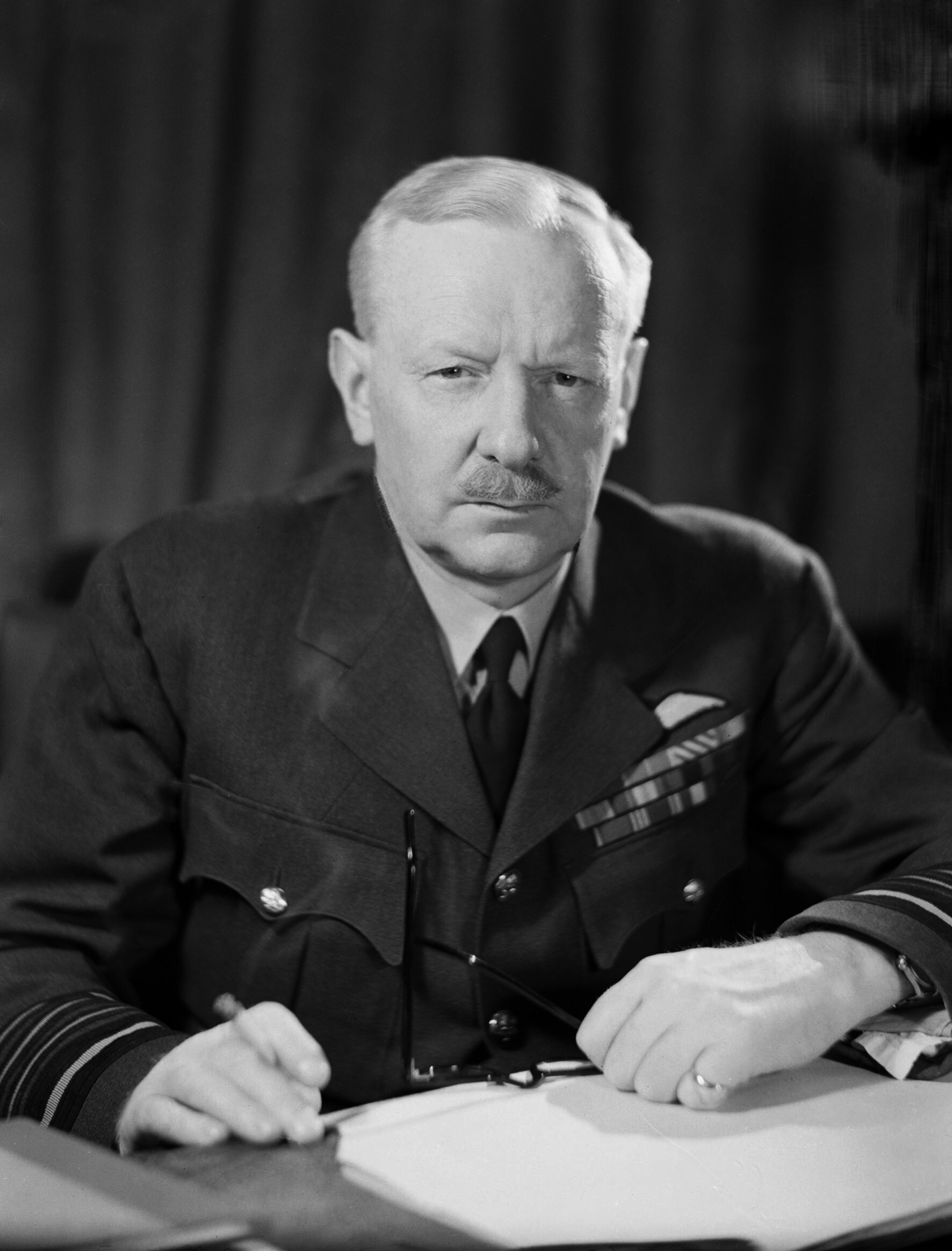
Air Chief Marshal Arthur Harris, head of RAF Bomber Command, strongly objected to Churchill's description of the raid as an "act of terror", a comment Churchill withdrew in the face of Harris's protest.

Having been given a paraphrased version of Churchill's memo by Bottomley, on 29 March, Air Chief Marshal Arthur Harris wrote to the Air Ministry:

...in the past we were justified in attacking German cities. But to do so was always repugnant and now that the Germans are beaten anyway we can properly abstain from proceeding with these attacks. This is a doctrine to which I could never subscribe. Attacks on cities like any other act of war are intolerable unless they are strategically justified. But they are strategically justified in so far as they tend to shorten the war and preserve the lives of Allied soldiers. To my mind we have absolutely no right to give them up unless it is certain that they will not have this effect. I do not personally regard the whole of the remaining cities of Germany as worth the bones of one British Grenadier.

The feeling, such as there is, over Dresden, could be easily explained by any psychiatrist. It is connected with German bands and Dresden shepherdesses. Actually Dresden was a mass of munitions works, an intact government centre, and a key transportation point to the East. It is now none of these things.

The phrase "worth the bones of one British grenadier" echoed Otto von Bismarck's: "The whole of the Balkans is not worth the bones of a single Pomeranian grenadier". Under pressure from the Chiefs of Staff and in response to the views expressed by Portal and Harris among others, Churchill withdrew his memo and issued a new one. This was completed on 1 April 1945:

...the moment has come when the question of the so called 'area-bombing' of German cities should be reviewed from the point of view of our own interests. If we come into control of an entirely ruined land, there will be a great shortage of accommodation for ourselves and our allies. ... We must see to it that our attacks do no more harm to ourselves in the long run than they do to the enemy's war effort.

=== American ===
John Kenneth Galbraith was among those in the Roosevelt administration who had qualms about the bombing. As one of the directors of the United States Strategic Bombing Survey, formed late in the war by the American Office of Strategic Services to assess the results of the aerial bombardments of Nazi Germany, he wrote: "The incredible cruelty of the attack on Dresden when the war had already been won—and the death of children, women, and civilians—that was extremely weighty and of no avail". The Survey's majority view on the Allies' bombing of German cities, however, concluded:

The city area raids have left their mark on the German people as well as on their cities. Far more than any other military action that preceded the actual occupation of Germany itself, these attacks left the German people with a solid lesson in the disadvantages of war. It was a terrible lesson; conceivably that lesson, both in Germany and abroad, could be the most lasting single effect of the air war.

== Timeline ==
Table of the air raids on Dresden by the Allies during World War II
Date	Target area	Force	Aircraft	High explosive bombs on target (tons)	Incendiary bombs on target (tons)	Total tonnage
7 October 1944	Marshalling yards	US 8th AF	30	72.5	—	72.5
16 January 1945	Marshalling yards	US 8th AF	133	279.8	41.6	321.4
13/14 February 1945	City area	RAF BC	772	1477.7	1181.6	2659.3
14 February 1945	Marshalling yards	US 8th AF	316	487.7	294.3	782.0
15 February 1945	Marshalling yards	US 8th AF	211	465.6	—	465.6
2 March 1945	Marshalling yards	US 8th AF	406	940.3	140.5	1080.8
17 April 1945	Marshalling yards	US 8th AF	572	1526.4	164.5	1690.9
17 April 1945	Industrial area	US 8th AF	8	28.0	—	28.0

== Reconstruction and reconciliation ==
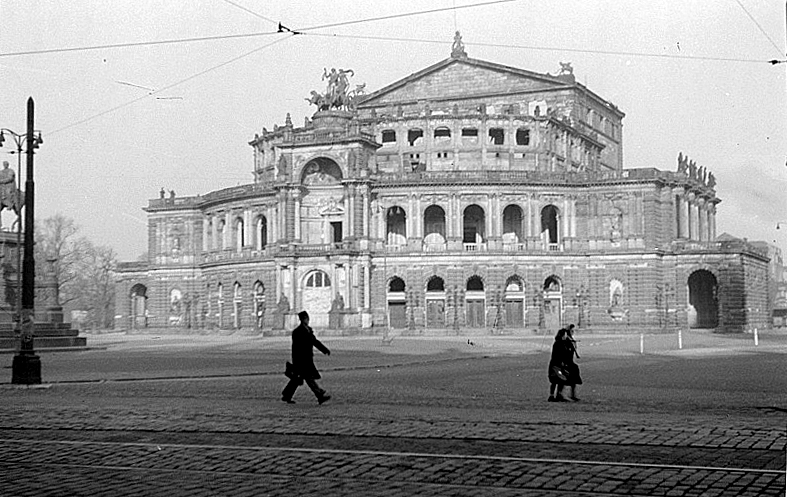
The Semperoper in July 1945

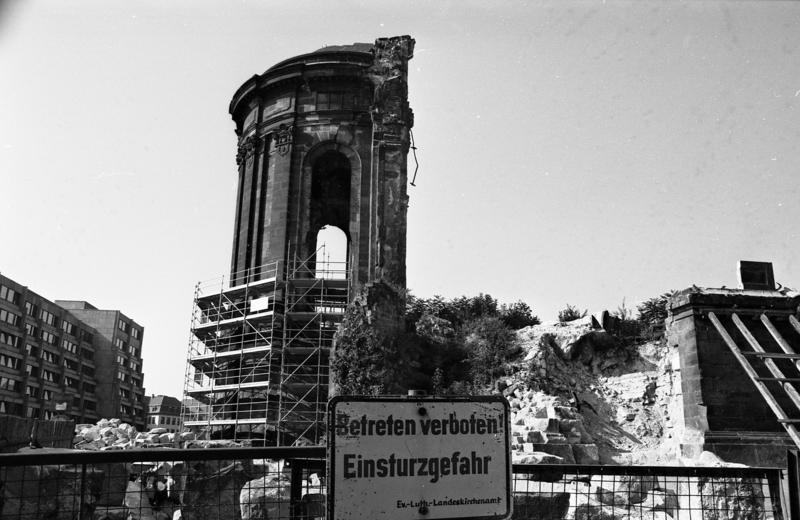
Frauenkirche ruins in 1991

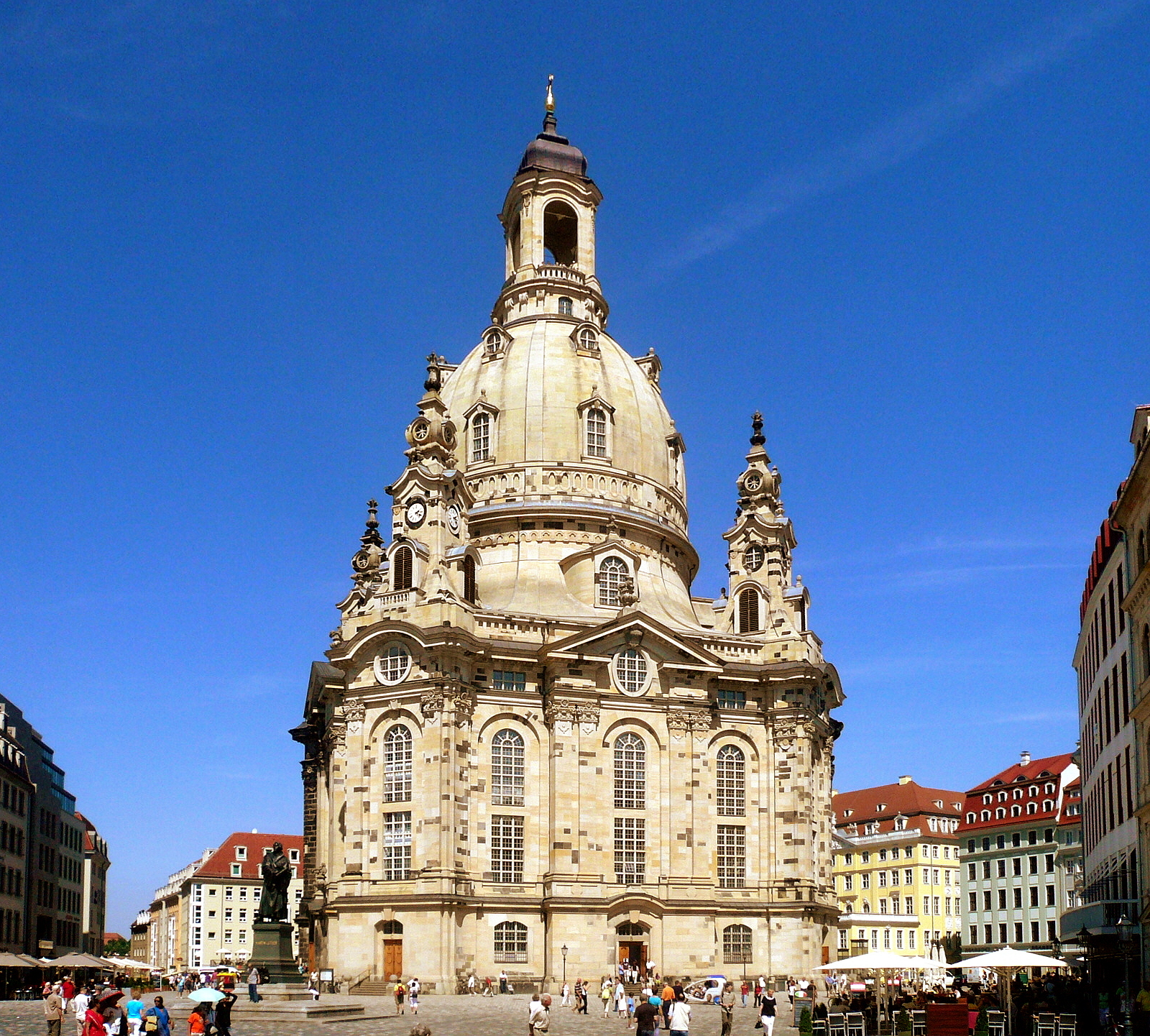
Reconstructed Frauenkirche with other reconstructed Baroque buildings on the Neumarkt

After the war, and again after German reunification, great efforts were made to rebuild some of Dresden's former landmarks, such as the Frauenkirche, the Semperoper (the Saxony state opera house) and the Zwinger Palace (the latter two were rebuilt before reunification).

In 1956, Dresden entered a twin-town relationship with Coventry. As a centre of military and munitions production, Coventry suffered some of the worst attacks on any British city at the hands of the Luftwaffe during the Coventry Blitzes of 1940 and 1941, which killed over 1,200 civilians and destroyed its cathedral.

In 1990, after the fall of the Berlin Wall, a group of prominent Dresdeners formed an international appeal known as the "Call from Dresden" to request help in rebuilding the Lutheran Frauenkirche, the destruction of which had over the years become a symbol of the bombing. The baroque Church of Our Lady (completed in 1743) had initially appeared to survive the raids, but collapsed a few days later, and the ruins were left in place by later Communist governments as an anti-war memorial.

A British charity, the Dresden Trust, was formed in 1993 to raise funds in response to the call for help, eventually raising over £1 million from British society, equivalent to £1.8 million in 2025. One of the gifts they made to the project was an orb and cross made in London by goldsmiths at Grant Macdonald and at least 7 metres (23 ft) tall, using medieval nails recovered from the ruins of the roof of Coventry Cathedral, and crafted in part by Alan Smith, the son of a pilot who took part in the raid.

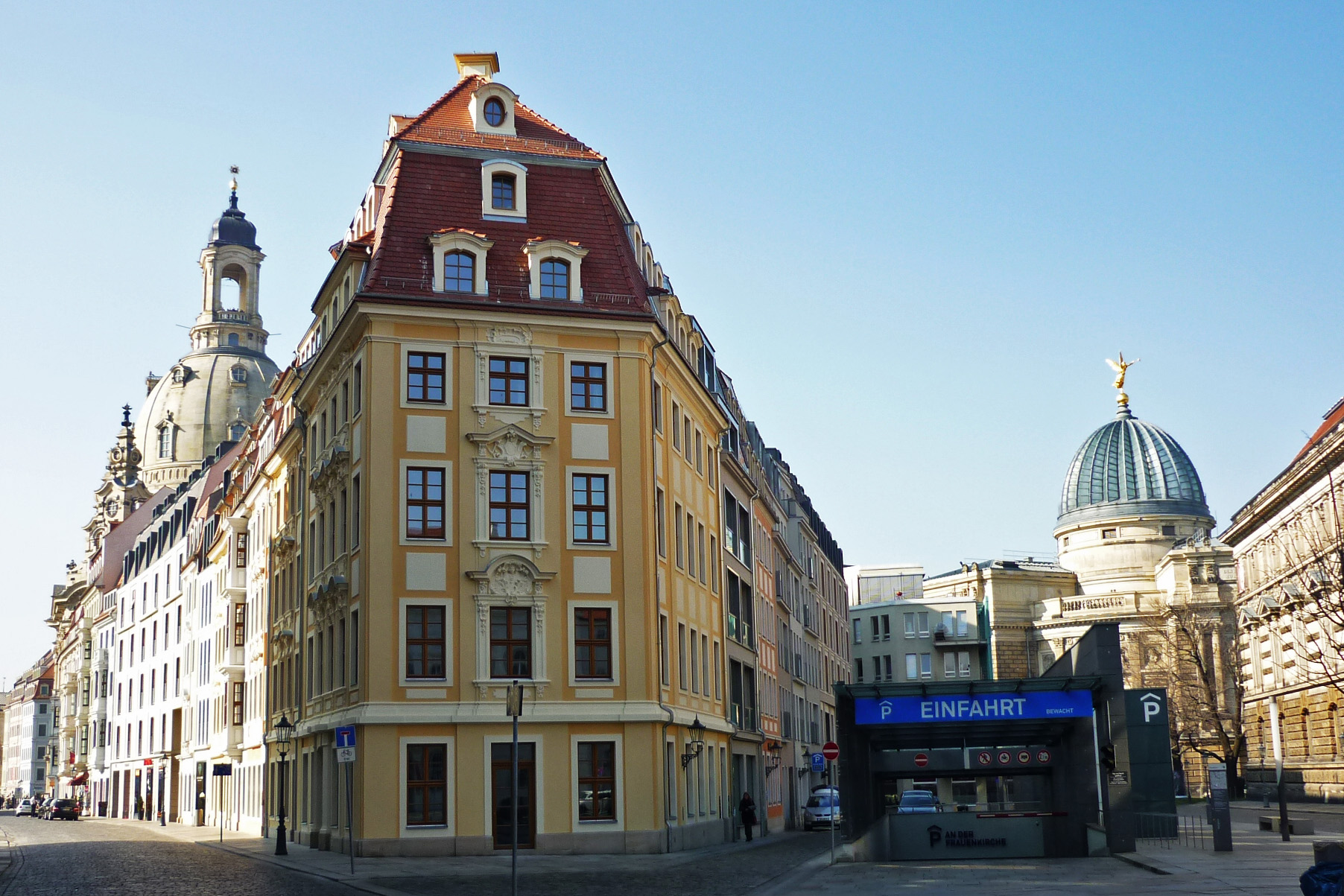
Baroque buildings reconstructed by the GHND near the Frauenkirche

The new Frauenkirche was reconstructed over seven years by architects using 3D computer technology to analyse old photographs and every piece of rubble that had been kept and was formally consecrated on 30 October 2005, in a service attended by some 1,800 guests, including Germany's president, Horst Köhler, previous chancellors Gerhard Schröder and Angela Merkel, and the Duke of Kent.

A further development towards the reconstruction of Dresden's historical core came in 1999 when the Dresden Historical Neumarkt Society (GHND) was founded. The society is committed to reconstructing the historic city centre as much as possible. When plans for the rebuilding of Dresden's Frauenkirche became certain, the GHND began calls for the reconstruction of historic buildings that surrounded it.

In 2003, a petition in support of reconstructing the Neumarkt area was signed by nearly 68,000 people, amounting to 15% of the entire electorate. This demonstrated broad support for the initiative and widespread appreciation for historical Dresden. This led to the city council's decision to rebuild a large amount of baroque buildings in accordance to historical designs, but with modern buildings in between them.

As of 2020, reconstruction of the surrounding Neumarkt buildings continues.

== Post-war debate ==
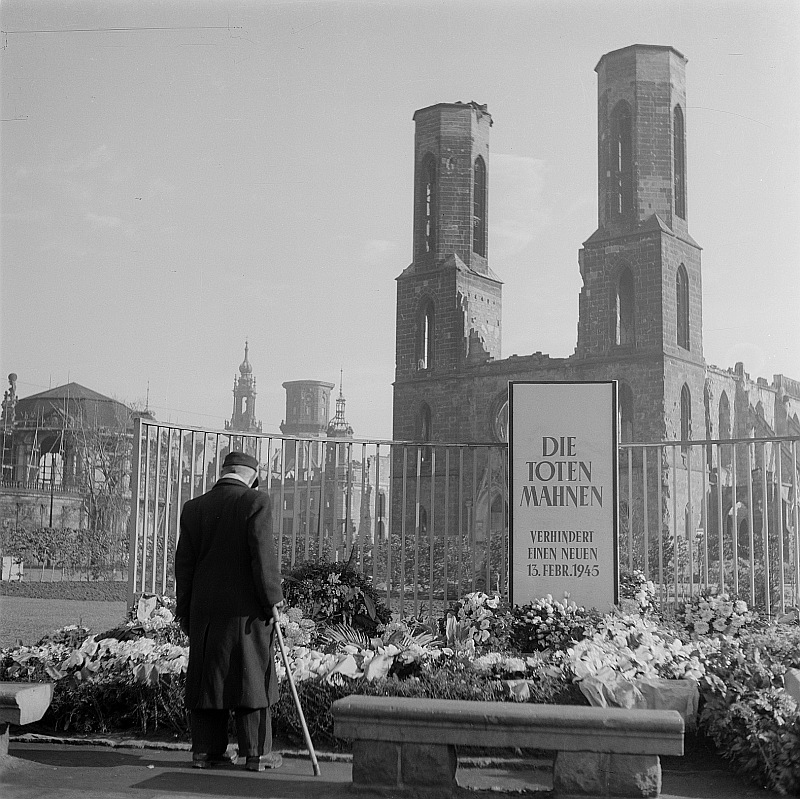
Bombing of Dresden Memorial

The bombing of Dresden remains controversial and is subject to an ongoing debate by historians and scholars regarding the moral and military justifications surrounding the event. British historian Frederick Taylor wrote of the attacks: "The destruction of Dresden has an epically tragic quality to it. It was a wonderfully beautiful city and a symbol of baroque humanism and all that was best in Germany. It also contained all of the worst from Germany during the Nazi period. In that sense it is an absolutely exemplary tragedy for the horrors of 20th century warfare and a symbol of destruction".

Several factors have made the bombing a unique point of contention and debate. First among these are the Nazi government's exaggerated claims immediately afterwards. The fact that the attack was carried out in the final stages of the war, and the public perception that, unlike Hamburg, Dresden was not a major industrial centre and its contribution to the war effort was not so significant, fueled the flames of controversy.

=== Legal considerations ===
The Hague Conventions, addressing the codes of wartime conduct on land and at sea, were adopted before the rise of air power. Despite repeated diplomatic attempts to update enacted international humanitarian law to include aerial warfare, it was not updated before the outbreak of World War II. The absence of specific international humanitarian law does not mean that the laws of war did not cover aerial warfare, but the existing laws remained open to interpretation. Specifically, whether the attack can be considered a war crime depends on whether the city was defended and whether resistance was offered against an approaching enemy. Allied arguments centre around the existence of a local air defence system and additional ground defences the Germans were constructing in anticipation of Soviet advances.

=== Falsification of evidence ===
Holocaust deniers and pro-Nazi polemicists—most notably British writer David Irving—use the bombing in an attempt to establish a moral equivalence between the war crimes committed by the Nazi government and the killing of German civilians by Allied bombing raids. As such, grossly inflated casualty figures have been promulgated over the years, many based on a figure of over 200,000 deaths quoted in a forged version of the casualty report, Tagesbefehl No. 47, that originated with Hitler's Reich Minister of Propaganda Joseph Goebbels. Irving's book The Destruction of Dresden, argued that the Allied bombing killed 135,000 inhabitants; these figures were initially widely accepted, but have since been described as "inflated".

==== Marshall inquiry ====
An inquiry conducted at the behest of US Army Chief of Staff, General George C. Marshall, stated the raid was justified by the available intelligence. The inquiry declared the elimination of the German ability to reinforce a counterattack against Marshal Ivan Konev's extended line or, alternatively, to retreat and regroup using Dresden as a base of operations, were important military objectives. As Dresden had been largely untouched during the war due to its location, it was one of few remaining rail and communications centres. A secondary objective was to disrupt the industrial use of Dresden for munitions manufacture, which American intelligence believed was the case. The shock to military planners and to the Allied civilian populations of the German counterattack known as the Battle of the Bulge had ended speculation that the war was almost over, and may have contributed to the decision to continue with the aerial bombardment of German cities.

The inquiry concluded that by the presence of active German military units nearby, and the presence of fighters and anti-aircraft within an effective range, Dresden qualified as "defended". By this stage in the war, both the British and the Germans had integrated air defences at the national level; the tribunal argued that this meant no German city was undefended.

Marshall's tribunal declared that no extraordinary decision was made to single out Dresden (for instance, to take advantage of a large number of refugees, or purposely terrorise the German populace), arguing that the area bombing was intended to disrupt communications and destroy industrial production. The American inquiry established that the Soviets, under allied agreements for the United States and the United Kingdom to provide air support for the Soviet offensive toward Berlin, had requested area bombing of Dresden to prevent a counterattack through Dresden, or the use of Dresden as a regrouping point following a German strategic retreat.

==== US Air Force Historical Division report ====
US Air Force table showing tonnage of bombs dropped by the Allies on Germany's seven largest cities during the war
City	Population (1939)	Tonnage			Tonnage per 100,000 inhabitants (tons)
City	Population (1939)	American (tons)	British (tons)	Total (tons)	Tonnage per 100,000 inhabitants (tons)
Berlin	4,339,000	22,090	45,517	67,607	1,558
Hamburg	1,129,000	17,104	22,583	39,687	3,515
Munich	841,000	11,471	7,858	19,329	2,298
Cologne	772,000	10,211	34,712	44,923	5,819
Leipzig	707,000	5,410	6,206	11,616	1,643
Essen	667,000	1,518	36,420	37,938	5,688
Dresden	642,000	4,441	2,659	7,100	1,106

A report by the US Air Force Historical Division (USAFHD) analysed the circumstances of the raid and concluded that it was militarily necessary and justified, based on the following points:

1. The raid had legitimate military ends, brought about by exigent military circumstances.
2. Military units and anti-aircraft defences were sufficiently close that it was not valid to consider the city "undefended".
3. The raid did not use extraordinary means but was comparable to other raids used against comparable targets.
4. The raid was carried out through the normal chain of command, pursuant to directives and agreements then in force.
5. The raid achieved the military objective, without excessive loss of civilian life.

The first point regarding the legitimacy of the raid depends on two claims: first, that the railyards subjected to American precision bombing were an important logistical target, and that the city was also an important industrial centre. Even after the main firebombing, there were two further raids on the Dresden railway yards by the USAAF. The first was on 2 March 1945, by 406 B-17s, which dropped 940 tons of high-explosive bombs and 141 tons of incendiaries. The second was on 17 April, when 580 B-17s dropped 1,554 tons of high-explosive bombs and 165 tons of incendiaries.

As far as Dresden being a militarily significant industrial centre, an official 1942 guide described the German city as "one of the foremost industrial locations of the Reich", and in 1944, the German Army High Command's Weapons Office listed 127 medium-to-large factories and workshops that supplied materiel to the military. Dresden was the seventh-largest German city, and by far the largest un-bombed built-up area left, and thus was contributing to the defence of Germany itself.

According to the USAFHD, there were 110 factories and 50,000 workers supporting the German war effort in Dresden at the time of the raid. These factories manufactured fuses and bombsights (at Zeiss Ikon A.G.), aircraft components, anti-aircraft guns, field guns, and small arms, poison gas, gears and differentials, electrical and X-ray apparatus, electric gauges, gas masks, Junkers aircraft engines, and Messerschmitt fighter cockpit parts.

The second of the five points addresses the prohibition in the Hague Conventions, of "attack or bombardment" of "undefended" towns. The USAFHD report states that Dresden was protected by anti-aircraft defences, antiaircraft guns, and searchlights, under the Combined Dresden (Corps Area IV) and Berlin (Corps Area III) Air Service Commands.

The third and fourth points say that the size of the Dresden raid—in terms of numbers, types of bombs and the means of delivery—were commensurate with the military objective and similar to other Allied bombings. On 23 February 1945, the Allies bombed Pforzheim and caused an estimated 20,000 civilian fatalities. The most devastating raid on any city was on Tokyo on 9–10 March (the Meetinghouse raid) which caused over 100,000 casualties, many civilian. The tonnage and types of bombs listed in the service records of the Dresden raid were comparable to (or less than) throw weights of bombs dropped in other air attacks carried out in 1945. In the case of Dresden, as in many other similar attacks, the hour break in between the RAF raids was a deliberate ploy to attack the fire fighters, medical teams, and military units.

In late July 1943, the city of Hamburg was bombed during Operation Gomorrah by combined RAF and USAAF strategic bomber forces. Four major raids were carried out in the span of 10 days, of which the most notable, on the night of 27–28 July, created a devastating firestorm effect similar to Dresden's, killing an estimated 18,474 people. The death toll for that night is included in the overall estimated total of 37,000 for the series of raids. Two-thirds of the remaining population reportedly fled the city after the raids.

The fifth point is that the firebombing achieved the intended effect of disabling the industry in Dresden. It was estimated that at least 23 per cent of the city's industrial buildings were destroyed or severely damaged. The damage to other infrastructure and communications was immense, which would have severely limited the potential use of Dresden to stop the Soviet advance. The report concludes:

The specific forces and means employed in the Dresden bombings were in keeping with the forces and means employed by the Allies in other aerial attacks on comparable targets in Germany. The Dresden bombings achieved the strategic objectives that underlay the attack and were of mutual importance to the Allies and the Russians.

=== Arguments against justification ===
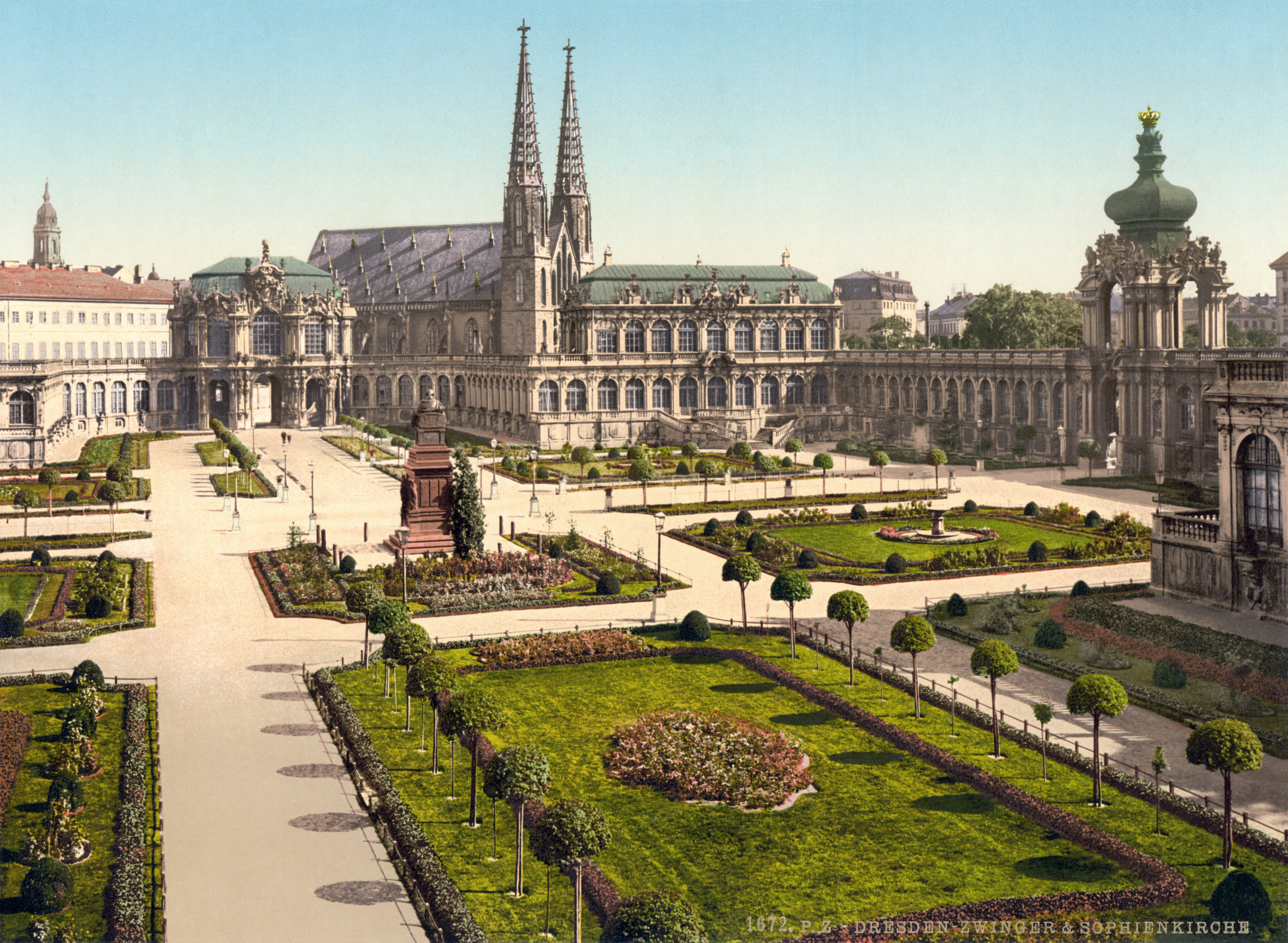
The Zwinger Palace in 1900

==== Military reasons ====
The journalist Alexander McKee cast doubt on the meaningfulness of the list of targets mentioned in the 1953 USAF report, pointing out that the military barracks listed as a target were a long way out of the city and were not targeted during the raid. The "hutted camps" mentioned in the report as military targets were also not military but were camps for refugees. It is also stated that the important Autobahn bridge to the west of the city was not targeted or attacked, and that no railway stations were on the British target maps, nor any bridges, such as the railway bridge spanning the Elbe River. Commenting on this, McKee says: "The standard whitewash gambit, both British and American, is to mention that Dresden contained targets X, Y and Z, and to let the innocent reader assume that these targets were attacked, whereas in fact the bombing plan totally omitted them and thus, except for one or two mere accidents, they escaped". McKee further asserts "The bomber commanders were not really interested in any purely military or economic targets, which was just as well, for they knew very little about Dresden; the RAF even lacked proper maps of the city. What they were looking for was a big built-up area which they could burn, and that Dresden possessed in full measure."

According to historian Sönke Neitzel, "it is difficult to find any evidence in German documents that the destruction of Dresden had any consequences worth mentioning on the Eastern Front. The industrial plants of Dresden played no significant role in German industry at this stage in the war". Neitzel later posits that attacks which are not just indiscriminate but also target civilians are war crimes. Wing Commander H. R. Allen said, "The final phase of Bomber Command's operations was far and away the worst. Traditional British chivalry and the use of minimum force in war was to become a mockery and the outrages perpetrated by the bombers will be remembered a thousand years hence".

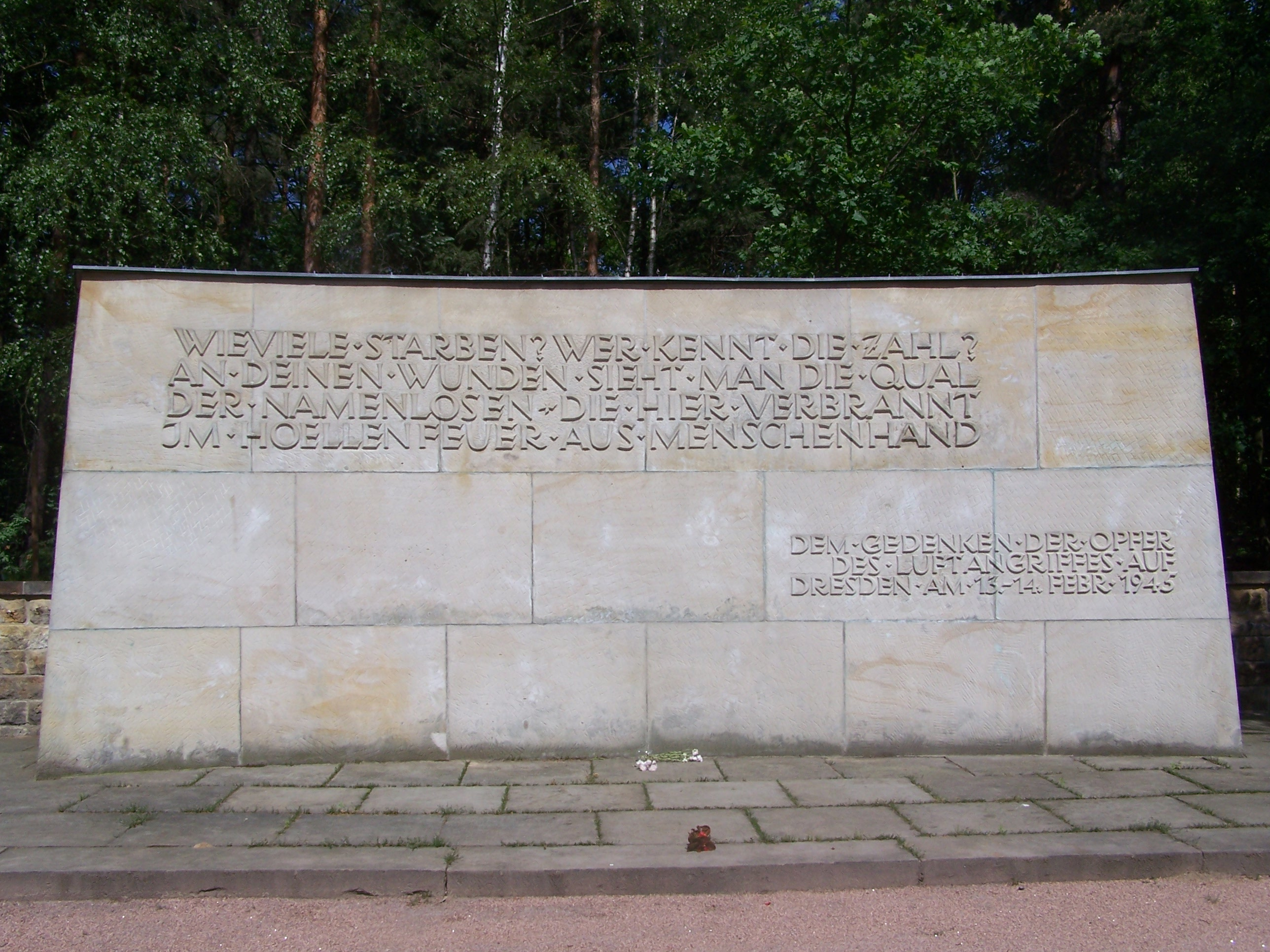
A memorial at Heidefriedhof cemetery in Dresden. It reads: Wieviele starben? Wer kennt die Zahl? An deinen Wunden sieht man die Qual der Namenlosen, die hier verbrannt, im Höllenfeuer aus Menschenhand. (transl. How many died? Who knows the count? In your wounds one sees the agony of the nameless, who in here were conflagrated, in the hellfire made by hands of man.)

==== As an immoral act, but not a war crime ====
... ever since the deliberate mass bombing of civilians in the second world war, and as a direct response to it, the international community has outlawed the practice. It first tried to do so in the Fourth Geneva Convention of 1949, but the UK and the US would not agree, since to do so would have been an admission of guilt for their systematic "area bombing" of German and Japanese civilians.

— A.C. Grayling.

Frederick Taylor told Der Spiegel, "I personally find the attack on Dresden horrific. It was overdone, it was excessive and is to be regretted enormously," but, "A war crime is a very specific thing which international lawyers argue about all the time and I would not be prepared to commit myself nor do I see why I should. I'm a historian." Similarly, British philosopher A. C. Grayling has described RAF area bombardment as an "immoral act" and "moral crime" because "destroying everything... contravenes every moral and humanitarian principle debated in connection with the just conduct of war", though Grayling insisted that it "is not strictly correct to describe area bombing as a 'war crime'."

==== As a war crime ====
According to Gregory Stanton, lawyer and president of Genocide Watch:

... every human being having the capacity for both good and evil. The Nazi Holocaust was among the most evil genocides in history. But the Allies' firebombing of Dresden and nuclear destruction of Hiroshima and Nagasaki were also war crimes – and as Leo Kuper and Eric Markusen have argued, also acts of genocide. We are all capable of evil and must be restrained by law from committing it.

Historian Donald Bloxham states, "The bombing of Dresden on 13–14 February 1945 was a war crime". He further argues there was a strong prima facie case for trying Winston Churchill among others and a theoretical case Churchill could have been found guilty. "This should be a sobering thought. If, however it is also a startling one, this is probably less the result of widespread understanding of the nuance of international law and more because in the popular mind 'war criminal', like 'paedophile' or 'terrorist', has developed into a moral rather than a legal categorisation".

German author Günter Grass is one of several intellectuals and commentators who have also called the bombing a war crime.

Proponents of this position argue that the devastation from firebombing was greater than anything that could be justified by military necessity alone, and this establishes a prima facie case. The Allies were aware of the effects of firebombing, as British cities had been subject to them during the Blitz. (Note: Longmate describes a 22 September 1941 memorandum prepared by the British Air Ministry's Directorate of Bombing Operations that puts numbers to this analysis.) Proponents disagree that Dresden had a military garrison and claim that most of the industry was in the outskirts and not in the targeted city centre, and that the cultural significance of the city should have precluded the Allies from bombing it.

==== As of concealed purpose ====
A revisionist story, persisting into the 21st century, was that the bombing was done, at least in part, to give the Soviets a signal demonstration—a warning—of the destructive power of the Allied bomber forces (the Soviets were expected to occupy Dresden presently).

==== Political response in Germany ====
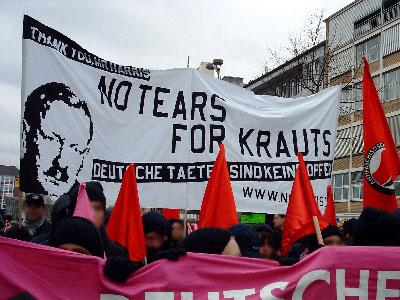
Anti-German banner expressing support for Air Chief Marshal Arthur Harris who is associated with the area bombing of German cities

Far-right politicians in Germany have sparked a great deal of controversy by promoting the term Bombenholocaust (transl. holocaust by bombs) to describe the raids. Der Spiegel writes that, for decades, the Communist government of East Germany promoted the bombing as an example of "Anglo-American terror", and now the same rhetoric is being used by the far right. An example can be found in the extremist nationalist party Die Heimat. A party's representative, Jürgen Gansel, described the Dresden raids as "mass murder", and "Dresden's holocaust of bombs". This provoked an outrage in the German parliament and triggered responses from the media. Prosecutors said that it was legal to call the bombing a holocaust. In 2010, groups opposing the far-right blocked a demonstration of far-right organisations. Similar rallies take place every year.

Phrases like "Bomber-Harris, do it again!", "Bomber-Harris Superstar – Thanks from the red Antifa", and "Deutsche Täter sind keine Opfer!" (transl. "German perpetrators are no victims!") are popular slogans among the so-called "Anti-Germans" – a small radical left-wing political movement in Germany and Austria. In 1995, the fiftieth anniversary of the bombing, Anti-Germans praised the bombing on the grounds that so many of the city's civilians had supported Nazism.

== In literature and the arts ==
=== Kurt Vonnegut ===
Kurt Vonnegut's novel Slaughterhouse-Five or The Children's Crusade: A Duty-Dance with Death (1969) used some elements from his experiences as a prisoner of war at Dresden during the bombing. The death toll of 135,000 given by Vonnegut was taken from The Destruction of Dresden, a then-respected 1963 book by David Irving, an author who would later be discredited by the history community amid a turn towards Holocaust denial. In a 1965 letter to The Guardian, Irving later adjusted his estimates even higher, "almost certainly between 100,000 and 250,000", but these figures were inflated; Irving finally published a correction in The Times in a 1966 letter to the editor lowering it to 25,000, in line with subsequent scholarship. Despite Irving's eventual much lower numbers, and later accusations of generally poor scholarship, the figure remains in general circulation after being popularised by Vonnegut.

In a 2006 Rolling Stone article, Vonnegut is quoted recalling "utter destruction" and "carnage unfathomable". The Germans put him and other POWs to work gathering bodies for mass burial. "But there were too many corpses to bury. So instead the Nazis sent in troops with flamethrowers. All these civilians' remains were burned to ashes."

In the special introduction to the 1976 Franklin Library edition of the novel, he wrote:

The Dresden atrocity, tremendously expensive and meticulously planned, was so meaningless, finally, that only one person on the entire planet got any benefit from it. I am that person. I wrote this book, which earned a lot of money for me and made my reputation, such as it is. One way or another, I got two or three dollars for every person killed. Some business I'm in.

The firebombing of Dresden was depicted in George Roy Hill's 1972 movie adaptation of Vonnegut's novel.

Vonnegut's experiences in Dresden were also used in several of his other books and are included in his posthumously published writings in Armageddon in Retrospect. In one of those essays, Vonnegut paraphrased leaflets dropped by the Allies in the days after the bombings as saying:

To the people of Dresden: We were forced to bomb your city because of the heavy military traffic your railroad facilities have been carrying. We realize that we haven't always hit our objectives. Destruction of anything other than military objectives was unintentional, unavoidable fortunes of war.

Vonnegut notes that many of those railroad facilities were not actually bombed, and those that were hit were restored to operation within several days.

Freeman Dyson, a British-American physicist who had worked as a young man with RAF Bomber Command from July 1943 to the end of the war, wrote in later years (1979):

For many years I had intended to write a book on the bombing. Now I do not need to write it, because Vonnegut has written it much better than I could. He was in Dresden at the time and saw what happened. His book is not only good literature. It is also truthful. The only inaccuracy that I found in it is that it does not say that the night attack which produced the holocaust was a British affair. The Americans only came the following day to plow over the rubble. Vonnegut, being American, did not want to write his account in such a way that the whole thing could be blamed on the British. Apart from that, everything he says is true.

In 1995, Vonnegut recalled having discussed the bombing with Dyson, and quotes Dyson as attributing the decision to bomb Dresden to "bureaucratic momentum".

=== Other ===
- The devastation of Dresden was recorded in the woodcuts of Wilhelm Rudolph, an artist born in the city who resided there until his death in 1982, and was 55 at the time of the bombing. His studio having burned in the attack with his life's work, Rudolph immediately set out to record the destruction, systematically drawing block after block, often repeatedly to show the progress of clearing or chaos that ensued in the ruins. Although the city had been sealed off by the Wehrmacht to prevent looting, Rudolph was granted a special permit to enter and carry out his work, as he would be during the Russian occupation as well. By the end of 1945, he had completed almost 200 drawings, which he transferred to woodcuts following the war. He organised these as discrete series that he would always show as a whole, from the 52 woodcuts of Aus (Out, or Gone) in 1948, the 35 woodcuts Dresden 1945–After the Catastrophe in 1949, and the 15 woodcuts and 5 lithographs of Dresden 1945 in 1955. Of this work, Rudolph later described himself as gripped by an "obsessive-compulsive state", under the preternatural spell of war, which revealed to him that "the utterly fantastic is the reality. ... Beside that, every human invention remains feeble."
- Five Days, Five Nights is a 1961 joint Soviet–East German film that dramatizes the search for the missing paintings of the Dresden Gallery in the aftermath of WWII.
- The tragedy of Dresden, as seen through the eyes of Polish forced laborers, was presented by Polish director Jan Rybkowski in the 1961 movie Tonight a City Will Die.
- The main action of the 1965 novella Closely Observed Trains, by Czech author Bohumil Hrabal, takes place on the night of the first raid.
- The 1978 piece for wind ensemble, Symphony I: In Memoriam, Dresden Germany, 1945 by composer Daniel Bukvich retells the bombing of Dresden through four intense movements depicting the emotion and stages before, during, and after the bombing.
- Henny Brenner (née Wolf) wrote about the bombing in her memoir, The Song is Over: Survival of a Jewish Girl in Dresden about how it allowed her and her parents to flee into hiding and avoid reporting pursuant to orders to show up for resettlement to a new "work assignment" on 16 February 1945, thus saving their lives.
- In the 1983 Pink Floyd album The Final Cut, "The Hero's Return", the protagonist lives his years after World War II tormented by "desperate memories", part of him still flying "over Dresden at angels 1–5" (fifteen thousand feet).
- The bombing is featured in the 1992 Vincent Ward film, Map of the Human Heart, with the hero, Avik, forced to bail out of his bomber and parachute down into the inferno.
- Jonathan Safran Foer's 2005 novel Extremely Loud and Incredibly Close (as well as the 2011 film adaptation of the same name) incorporates the bombings into essential parts of the story.
- The German diarist Victor Klemperer includes a firsthand account of the firestorm in his published works. During the chaos that followed the bombing, Klemperer removed his yellow star (an act punishable by death if discovered) on 19 February, joined a refugee column, and escaped into American-controlled territory.
- The bombings are a central theme in the 2006 German TV production Dresden by director Roland Suso Richter. Along with the romantic plot between a British bomber pilot and a German nurse, the movie attempts to reconstruct the facts surrounding the Dresden bombings from both the perspective of the RAF pilots and the Germans in Dresden at the time.
- In David Alan Mack's The Midnight Front, first book of his secret history historical fantasy series The Dark Arts, the bombing was a concentrated effort by the British, Soviet, and American forces to kill all of the known karcists (sorcerers) in the world in one fell swoop, Allied or not, out of fear of their power.
- The bombing is featured in the 2018 German film, Never Look Away.

== See also ==
- German Village (Dugway, UT) Testing site to optimize incendiary bombs on worker housing
- Atomic bombings of Hiroshima and Nagasaki (August 1945)
- Bombing of Chongqing (1938–1944) – the five years of massive terror-bombings and air battles over the Chinese wartime capital
- Bombing of Tokyo (10 March 1945), the firebombing raid on Tokyo codenamed Operation Meetinghouse on 9/10 March 1945
- The Blitz (1940 and 1941) – German air raids on British cities in which at least 40,000 died, including 57 consecutive nights of air raids just over London
- Baedeker Blitz (April and May 1942) – Air raids on English cities of cultural/historical importance, rather than military significance
- Bombing of Guernica (26 April 1937) – German/Italian air raid that sparked international outrage
- Israeli bombing of the Gaza Strip – comparable in destruction to Dresden
- Carpet bombing – also called "Saturation bombing"
