= Gansel =

Gansel is a German surname. It may refer to:

- Carsten Gansel (born 1955), German literary scholar
- Dennis Gansel (born 1973), German film director
- Edna Gansel (1899–1983), American violinist
- Jürgen Gansel (born 1974), German politician
