= Exorcising Hitler =

2011 book written by Frederick Taylor

First edition (publ. Bloomsbury Publishing)

Exorcising Hitler: The Occupation and Denazification of Germany is a 2011 book written by Frederick Taylor that examines the collapse of the Third Reich in 1945 and the subsequent Allied occupation of Germany. The book traces the transition from total war to postwar reconstruction, focusing on the military defeat of Nazi Germany, the administrative challenges faced by the occupying powers, and the implementation of denazification policies across the American, British, French, and Soviet zones. The book's title draws on the obsession with Hitler and the people of Germany's veritable worship and mythologization of him as an infallible leader, a fixation that the Allied powers sought to eradicate from the nation's psyche.

Using archival materials that include governmental records and personal testimonies, Taylor explores the immediate postwar conditions of devastation, mass displacement, food scarcity, and social disillusionment and disorientation, as well as the political debates that shaped Allied policy. The work argues that the occupation and denazification efforts of the Allies were uneven, often contradictory processes influenced by competing strategic priorities and the emerging Cold War. Exorcising Hitler situates these developments within the longer trajectory of German political and cultural transformation, interpreting the postwar period as the beginning of a protracted effort to confront the Nazi past and establish a stable democratic society. Scholars reviewing the book have by and large, praised it for its quality and sobering look at post-war sociopolitical developments.

== Synopsis ==
In Exorcising Hitler: The Occupation and Denazification of Germany, Frederick Taylor presents a comprehensive account of the collapse of the Third Reich in 1945 and the subsequent Allied effort to reconstruct German society. Taylor frames Germany's defeat as a civilizational rupture, comparing its fall with that of the Roman Empire. With cities destroyed, the economy shattered, and millions displaced or starving, Taylor argues that the victorious Western Allies confronted the task of what he terms on the book's back-cover as building "a humane, democratic nation on the ruins of the vanquished Nazi state—arguably the most monstrous regime the world has ever seen."

The attitudes of the Allied powers, Taylor argues, were deeply shaped by the war's brutality. At the Tehran Conference, Joseph Stalin suggested "shooting 50,000 senior German officers out of hand." Winston Churchill initially supported the summary execution of leading Nazis before abandoning the idea—partly due to American pressure—in favor of international trials. General Dwight D. Eisenhower likewise expressed profound anger during the fighting in 1944, writing during the Arnhem operation: "God, I hate the Germans!" Taylor presents these sentiments not as simple bigotry but as products of exhaustion and the ferocity of resistance encountered during the war's final year.

Nazi ideology, with its biologically grounded claims of racial superiority, had "no fallback position" for defeat since Nazi adherents were all too convinced that Germany simply "could not" lose. Following Hitler's suicide, many Germans expressed anger "born of disappointment rather than moral outrage," believing that he had "failed his people and then… left Germans to face the catastrophe alone." German society itself was undergoing a parallel psychological collapse. Taylor illustrates this through eyewitness accounts such as that of Ulrich Frodien, a teenage soldier who watched "an apparently endless, perfectly disciplined stream of hundreds of American Flying Fortresses" pass overhead and realized that the "much-vaunted miracle weapons and the ‘military genius’ of the Führer were nothing... There was no more hope, Germany was finished."

Taylor recounts the early Allied encounters inside the Reich, noting that responses ranged widely. When American forces entered the border town of Roetgen, some civilians greeted them with "flowers and even… coffee." At the same time, sporadic attacks—including assassinations by Werwolf units—reinforced Allied suspicions and led to what Taylor characterizes as "a nervous, unforgiving and sometimes aggressive relationship with the conquered Germans" in the war's immediate aftermath.

A central focus of the book is the denazification program, which the Allies initially conceived as a thorough purge of National Socialism "throughout industry, the arts, education and the sciences." In practice, the process was uneven and often hampered by political tensions and administrative realities. Facing the emerging Cold War and the need to stabilize Germany economically, the Western Allies increasingly prioritized reconstruction over rigorous purges. As a result, many former Nazis returned to public roles, while others escaped meaningful scrutiny. The Soviet approach, Taylor shows, was similarly shaped by political imperatives, though expressed through different ideological frameworks.

Despite these shortcomings, Taylor argues that the occupation period marked the beginning of a profound and long-term transformation. The establishment of democratic institutions in the West, the economic revival of the 1950s, and later political developments laid the groundwork for a more sustained moral reckoning. Taylor emphasizes that this deeper confrontation with the Nazi past emerged most forcefully in the 1960s, when younger Germans demanded accountability, initiated new war-crimes trials, and insisted that the Holocaust be placed at the center of national memory.

Overall, Taylor portrays the occupation and denazification of Germany as neither an unequivocal success nor a simple failure. Instead, he depicts a contingent, uneven process shaped by human limitations, geopolitical realities, and the unprecedented challenge of rebuilding a society leveled by dictatorship and total war. Exorcising Hitler presents the postwar transition as the first stage of a longer journey toward democratic renewal and historical self-understanding.

== Reception ==
Exorcising Hitler received a broadly positive critical response for its narrative sweep and synthesis, though some reviewers questioned its originality. In the Observer (published by The Guardian), Victor Sebestyen praised the book's ability to "debunk…many myths about the immediate postwar years," arguing that Taylor shows "the story was far more complicated than has invariably been told in the English-speaking world." He also highlights the work's account of denazification as a pragmatic, uneven process shaped by Cold War considerations and in other cases, administrative constraints. Taylor's handling of memory politics—especially the "sleep cure" he associates with West German society in the 1950s—also features in Sebestyen's discussion.

Kirkus Reviews gave the book a starred notice, calling it "hard-hitting yet evenhanded" and "a deeply compelling study of the peace enforced on Germany by the Allied victors," noting Taylor's balance between Allied policy aims and the experiences of a "traumatized" German population at Stunde Null. The review emphasizes the scale of Soviet losses, the flight westward, and the book's framing of the 1945–49 period as an improvised "enforced transformation," with later West German prosperity arriving before a deeper moral reckoning.

Writing in the Los Angeles Times, Martin Rubin described the study as "enthralling," commending Taylor’s "gift for recounting his story in a vivid way" and his portrait of a society struggling through currency collapse and scarcity until the 1948 reform. Rubin quotes Taylor’s concluding caution about whether Germany has truly "exorcised" Hitler, while lauding the book’s "judicious" tone. Some assessments were more critical. In Literary Review, Richard Overy argued that, despite the compelling question posed by the title, Taylor’s study "tells us almost nothing new" about how Germans confronted the legacy of 1945, calling the result "a disappointment" when set against Taylor’s earlier work on the Allied aerial bombardment against Dresden. By contrast, Richard J. Evans, writing in the New Statesman, characterized Exorcising Hitler as "popular history at its best," praising its readability and vivid portrait of occupied Germany and the nation's transition in its aftermath.

Generally speaking, reviewers tended to agree that Taylor’s narrative illuminates the contingencies of occupation and denazification—its mix of improvisation, realpolitik, selective justice, and delayed moral reckoning—while diverging over how far the book advances scholarly debates beyond established research.

== Bibliography ==
- Evans, Richard J. (7 March 2011). "'Wolves at the door.' Review of Frederick Taylor, Exorcising Hitler: The Occupation and Denazification of Germany". New Statesman.
- Kirkus (15 January 2011). "Exorcising Hitler: The Occupation and Denazification of Germany". Kirkus Reviews.
- Overy, Richard (March 2011). "Rebuilding A Nation". Literary Review.
- Rubin, Martin (5 July 2011). "Book Review: 'Exorcising Hitler: The Occupation and Denazification of Germany'". Los Angeles Times.
- Sebestyen, Victor (23 April 2011). "Exorcising Hitler: The Occupation and Denazification of Germany by Frederick Taylor – review". The Observer. The Guardian.
- Taylor, Frederick (2011). Exorcising Hitler: The Occupation and Denazification of Germany. New York: Bloomsbury Press. ISBN 978-1-59691-536-7.
