= Colin McKay Grierson =

Royal Air Force officer

- Born: 16 June 1906
- Died: 1991 (aged 84–85)
- Military career
- Allegiance: United Kingdom
- Branch: Royal Air Force
- Rank: Air Commodore
- Conflicts: World War II

Air Commodore Colin McKay Grierson CBE (16 June 1906 – 1991) was a senior officer in the Royal Air Force during and after World War II.

He joined the Royal Air Force (RAF) as an Aircraft Apprentice in 1921. In 1925 he became a Flight Cadet Sergeant. In 1927 he was on the staff of RAF Calshot with the rank of Pilot Officer. During the 1930s he held a number of different positions in the RAF as Armament and Engineering Officer. On 1 January 1941 he worked on the Air Staff in the Directorate of Plans.

On 20 May 1944 he became Assistant Chief of Staff A2 (Intelligence), Supreme Headquarters Allied Expeditionary Force (SHAEF) with the rank of Acting Air Commodore. At a press briefing two days after the Dresden raid on 14 February 1945, Grierson told journalists:

First of all they [Dresden and similar towns] are the centres to which evacuees are being moved. They are centres of communications through which traffic is moving across to the Russian Front, and from the Western Front to the East, and they are sufficiently close to the Russian Front for the Russians to continue the successful prosecution of their battle. I think these three reasons probably cover the bombing.

One of the journalists asked whether the principal aim of bombing of Dresden would be to cause confusion among the refugees or to blast communications carrying military supplies. Grierson answered that the primary aim was communications to prevent them moving military supplies, and to stop movement in all directions if possible. He then added in an offhand remark that the raid also helped destroying "what is left of German morale". Howard Cowan, an Associated Press war correspondent, subsequently filed a story saying that the Allies had resorted to terror bombing. This set in train a number of embarrassing questions on both sides of the Atlantic on the morality of this form of attack.

He retired from the RAF on 31 August 1950 with the rank of Air Commodore.
