= Victor Gregg =

British author and World War II veteran (1919–2021)

- Born: Victor James Thomas Gregg; 15 October 1919; Kings Cross, London, England
- Died: 12 October 2021 (aged 101)
- Writing career
- Notable works: Rifleman: A Front Line Life; King's Cross Kid

Victor James Thomas Gregg (15 October 1919 – 12 October 2021) was a British author, columnist and World War II veteran. Gregg joined the armed forces in 1937, and fought in North Africa and at the Battle of Arnhem. He survived the bombing of Dresden and, after the war, worked as a spy. His best known book is the memoir Rifleman: A Front Line Life, published in 2011. A prequel, King's Cross Kid, was published in 2013. Both were co-written with Rick Stroud.

== Biography ==
Gregg was born in King's Cross, London on 15 October 1919, the eldest of three children. He joined the British Army in 1937, signing up for 21 years; he first joined the Rifle Brigade in India and Palestine at the age of 19, before serving in the Western Desert. Before the Battle of Arnhem, he joined the 10th Battalion, Parachute Regiment. Victor was one of 582 men parachuted into Holland as part of the ill-fated Operation Market Garden. He was taken as a prisoner of war, and attempted twice to escape before being sent to work in a soap factory. After sabotaging the factory, causing it to burn to the ground, he was sentenced to death in Dresden, and only escaped due to Allied bombing in February 1945. He was discharged from the Army in 1946.

Gregg turned 100 in October 2019. At the time, he was interviewed and stated that Brexit was "breaking his heart". Gregg died on 12 October 2021, three days shy of his 102nd birthday.
