= Thunderclap plan =

Cancelled British-American WWII military operation

In 1944, during World War II, a plan called Operation Thunderclap was proposed. The idea was to bomb Berlin, which would inflict many casualties. However, the project was never put into action. General Laurence Kuter, the Assistant U.S. Chief of Staff of plans, was against the British Air Ministry's plan to bomb large and small cities all over Germany. However, a bombing of this scale could have had an enormous impact on the German people's morale. General Dwight D. Eisenhower was entirely on board for the Thunderclap Plan to massively bomb Berlin. He wrote about the plan, “While I have always insisted that U.S. Strategic Air Forces be directed against precision targets, I am always prepared to take part in anything that gives promise to ending the war quickly." However, President Franklin D. Roosevelt's Military Advisor, Admiral Leahy, said, “It would be a mistake to formally endorse the morale bombing of Germany.”

== Decision to target Dresden instead of Berlin ==
Instead of massively bombing Berlin, the Combined Air Staff thought to destroy many Eastern German cities, including Dresden, in a modified version of the Thunderclap plan. Winston Churchill wanted a bargaining chip that he could use against the Russians on the Eastern front and thought he could use this. The idea was for the Americans to bomb the railroads during the day and for the British to destroy other vital targets during the night. Marshal Harris proposed a double attack three hours apart on Dresden for the British section of the assault. The first was to cut off communication lines with the defences like flak batteries and fighter battalions and fire departments and other passive defences. Three hours later, the second wave would catch the fighters on the ground, refuelling and destroy them. The R.A.F. bombing sector played a critical role in the attack and planning. The attack on Dresden was designed to start an enormous fire, lighting the way for possibly another wave of bombers. The modified version of the Thunderclap plan was fully supported by the U.S. Army Chief of Staff, George Marshall. He thought that damage of this capacity would be an enormous setback to the German war effort.

== Lack of accurate maps of Dresden ==
However, in this plan, there were several problems. Dresden was never considered a serious target, so there were very few detailed and accurate maps of the city. They did not have enough information about the town to make a coordinated and effective attack on the city entirely. There was much doubt in many other areas of this assault. Nothing was known about the air defences of the town, so they would have a chance of being stopped by unknown defences. This was a significant risk that many pilots did not feel comfortable taking. Also, in the initial attack plan, the planners of the attack were unsure where exactly the correct railway lines were. There were many railways in Dresden, but the bombers did not know which ones to attack to make a more effective attack. Lastly, not enough fighters were in service to provide an escort with the planes, so no offence was put into action.
