= Edna Gansel =

American violinist

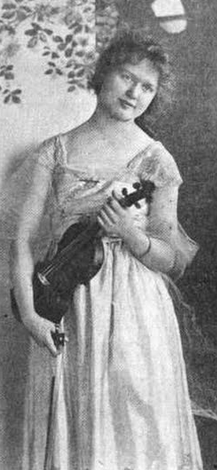
- Edna Gansel, from a 1921 publication
- Born: Frances Edna Gansel; April 11, 1899; Chicago, Illinois, U.S.
- Died: May 2, 1983 (age 84); California, U.S.
- Other names: Edna Gansel Dundon
- Occupation: Violinist

Frances Edna Gansel Dundon (April 11, 1899 – May 2, 1983) was an American violinist, music educator, composer, and writer, based in southern California.

== Early life and education ==
Gansel was born in Chicago, the daughter of Jonathan Young Scammon Gansel and Mary Frances Theresa Loeser Gansel. She studied with Harry Dimond in Chicago.

== Career ==
Gansel was an associate member of the University of Chicago Orchestra in 1915. She and her sister, pianist Laura Gansel, played music for guests at Chicago's La Salle Hotel for six years in the 1910s. During a recital at Kimball Hall in 1921, she displayed "charming stage presence and manner" and "remarkably fine technical equipment". She assisted music educator Gustav Berndt at the North Shore Conservatory. In 1925, Gansel opened a violin studio in Pasadena, and she taught at the Pasadena Conservatory of Music and Arts in 1928. Her New York debut was in 1930. She was sometimes an accompanist.

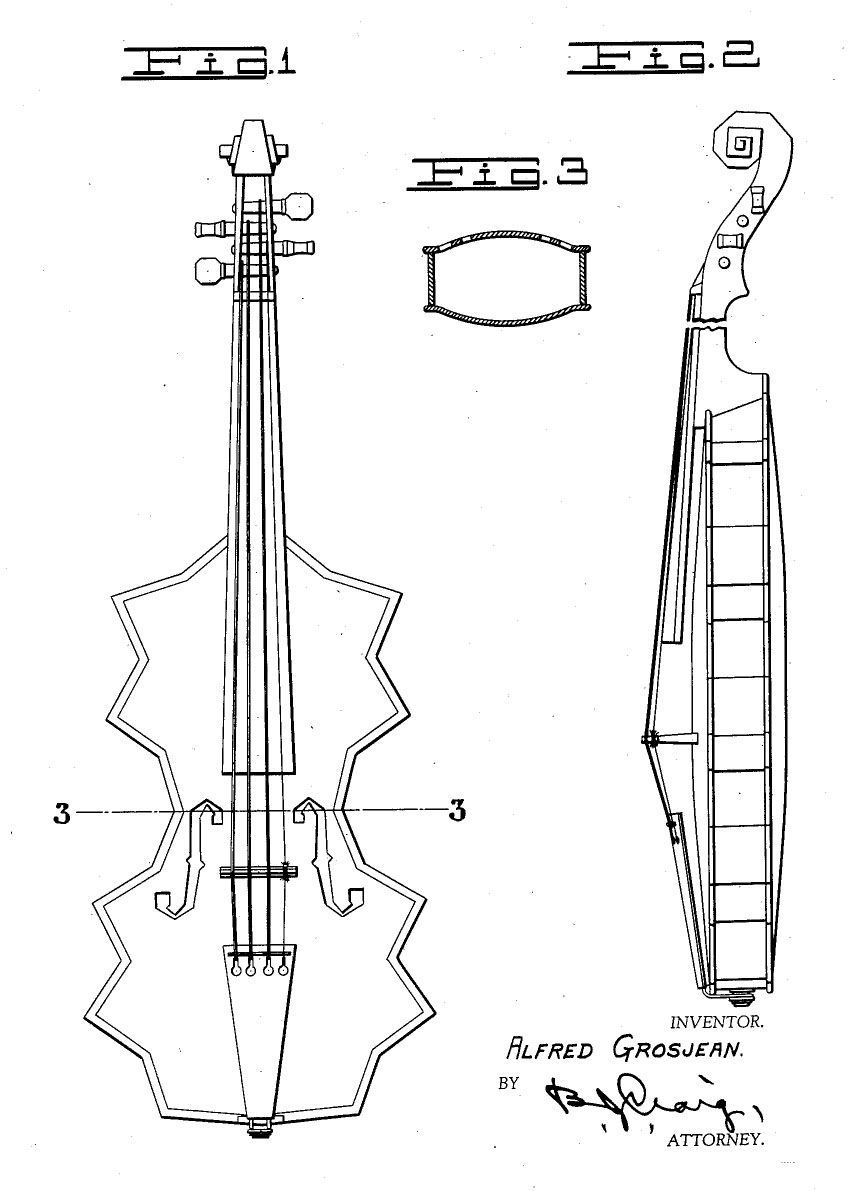
Patent drawing for the Grosjean & Gansel violin

In 1934, Gansel and Alfred Grosjean received a patent for a "modernistic violin". In 1954, Gansel gave an interview to the Pasadena Independent about the "demise of violin" and her campaign to revive violin education for children. "I'd like to have a great violin choir in Pasadena," she told the reporter.

== Works ==
- "Ave Maria of Peace" (1937, composition)
- The Echo of the Soul: The Story of the Violin (1937, a musical drama)
- Composite study for double stopping in eight positions for violin (1940)
- "Let My Dreams Come True" (1944, song, words by Joe Bonner)
- "My Heavenly Queen" (1944, song, words by Joe Bonner)
- "More Than You'll Ever, Ever Know" (1945, song, words by Joe Bonner)

== Personal life ==
Gansel married fellow entertainer Francis Augustine Dundon in 1925. They lived in Altadena, California, and had five children born between 1926 and 1942. One son died in infancy. Her youngest son Timothy survived a stabbing attack in 1959, and was a controversial figure known as "Zeke the Sheik" in their Altadena neighborhood for many years afterward. Her only daughter, Edna, died in 1979. Gansel's husband, who became an aerospace executive, died in 1981, and she died in 1983, at the age of 84, in California.
