= Frederick Taylor (historian) =

British novelist and historian

Frederick Taylor (born 28 December 1947 at Aylesbury, Buckinghamshire) is a British novelist and historian specialising in modern German history.

He was educated at Aylesbury Grammar School and read History and Modern Languages at Oxford University. He did postgraduate work at Sussex University on the rise of the extreme right in Germany in the early twentieth century. Before embarking on a series of historical monographs for which he is best known, he translated Goebbels Diaries 1939–1941 into English and wrote novels set in Germany.

== Bibliography ==
=== Novels ===
- Auf Wiedersehen, Pet. London: Sphere, 1983. Based on the television series.
- Walking Shadows. New York: St Martins, 1984.
- The Kinder Garden. London: Century, 1990.
- The Peacebrokers. London: Random House, 1992.

=== Non-fiction ===
- Dresden: Tuesday, 13 February 1945. London: Bloomsbury, 2004.
- The Berlin Wall: 13 August 1961 – 9 November 1989. London: Bloomsbury, 2006.
- Exorcising Hitler: The Occupation and Denazification of Germany. London: Bloomsbury, 2011.
- The Downfall of Money: Germany's Hyperinflation and the Destruction of the Middle Class. London: Bloomsbury, 2013.
- Coventry 10 November 1940. London: Bloomsbury, 2015.
- 1939: A People's History of the Coming of the Second World War. W. W. Norton & Company, 2020.

=== Translations ===
- The Goebbels Diaries 1939–1941. Translated and edited by Frederick Taylor. London: Hamish Hamilton, 1982.
