= Jürgen Gansel =

German politician

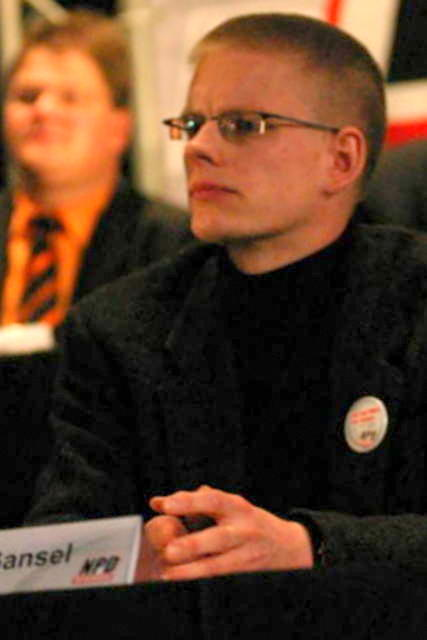

Jürgen Werner Gansel (born 6 July 1974) is a German politician. He is a representative of the National Democratic Party of Germany. From 2004 until 2014, he was a member of the Landtag of Saxony.
