= Governor of La Réunion =

French colonial role

The governor of Bourbon or La Réunion was a French colonial role. When the island became a French overseas department in 1946, the role was replaced by a prefect.

Réunion is a French overseas department and region with a population of about 800,000 located in the Indian Ocean, east of Madagascar, approximately 200 km southwest of Mauritius, the nearest island. The chief of state is the French President, who is represented by a prefect. The president of the General Council acts as head of the government. Elections held in Réunion include the French presidential vote. A prefect is appointed by the president on the advice of the French Ministry of the Interior. The presidents of the General and Regional Councils are elected by members of those councils.

(Dates in italics indicate de facto continuation of office)

== On behalf of the French East India Company (1649/1665–1767) ==
Start	End	Commandant
French Suzerainty
Annexed for France, named Île Bourbon; under the French East India Company rule
December 1649	5 August 1665	No central administration
5 August 1665	8 May 1671	Étienne Regnault (XVII century – 1688)
11 May 1671	22 November 1674	Jacques de La Heure (dit La Hure) (b. XVII century)
22 November 1674	1 December 1674	Jacob de la Haye (de facto)
French colony; under the French East India Company rule
1 December 1674	17 June 1678	Henry Esse d'Orgeret (b. XVII century)
18 June 1678	January 1680	Germain de Fleurimont Moulinier (b. XVII century)
January 1680	30 November 1686	F. Bernardin de Quimper (b. XVII century)
2 December 1686	9 December 1689	Jean-Baptiste Drouillard (b. XVII century)
11 December 1689	26 November 1690	Henri Habert de Vauboulon (XVII century – 1692)
4 March 1691	29 April 1694	Michel Firélin
1694	1694	Prades + Lemayeur (acting)
May 1694	2 July 1696	Directory of Saint Paul: Athanase Touchard, President; leader "naturel de l'île"; Louis Caron; René Hoarau; François Mussard; François Mussard; Antoine Payet
1 August 1696	6 June 1698	Joseph Bastide (b. XVII century)
21 October 1699	13 May 1701	Jacques de La Cour (de La Saulais) (b. XVII century)
12 June 1701	5 March 1709	Jean-Baptiste de Villiers (b. XVII century)
7 March 1709	24 March 1710	Michel François Des Bordes (sieur de Charanville) (b. XVII century)
22 April 1710	14 November 1715	(Pierre) Antoine de Parat de Chaillenest (XVII century – 1721)
4 December 1715	14 February 1718	Henri/Henry de Justamond (1683–1735)
6 September 1718	22 August 1723	Joseph Beauvollier de Courchant (b. XVIII century)
23 August 1723	1 December 1725	Antoine Desforges-Boucher (Labbé dit) (1680–1725)
2 December 1725	28 May 1727	Hélie Dioré (de Périgny) (b. XVII century)
21 July 1727	11 July 1735	Pierre Benoît Dumas (1696–1746)
12 July 1735	1 October 1735	Bertrand-François Mahé de La Bourdonnais (comte) (1699–1753)
Part of the French Mascarene Islands colony; under French East India Company rule
2 October 1735	30 September 1739	Charles L'Emery Dumont (b. XVII century)
11 November 1739	12 December 1743	Pierre-André d'Héguerty (1700–1763)
13 December 1743	8 May 1745	Didier de Saint-Martin (1st time) (b. XVII century)
15 May 1745	31 October 1745	Jean-Baptiste Azéma (1696–1745)
1 November 1745	18 December 1745	Didier de Saint-Martin (2nd time) (b. XVII century)
Start	End	Governor
Separate colony; under French East India Company rule
29 December 1745	28 March 1747	Gérard Gaspard de Ballade (1st time) (b. XVII century)
14 April 1747	11 November 1748	Didier de Saint-Martin (3rd time) (b. XVII century)
22 November 1748	17 March 1749	Gérard Gaspard de Ballade (2nd time) (b. XVII century)
24 May 1749	23 August 1749	Antoine Marie Desforges-Boucher (1st time) (1715–1790)
6 September 1749	16 October 1750	Joseph Brenier (1st time) (b. XVII century)
16 October 1750	14 December 1752	Jean-Baptiste Charles Bouvet de Lozier (1st time) (1706–1788)
14 December 1752	14 January 1756	Joseph Brénier (2nd time)
12 July 1757	15 October 1757	Antoine Marie Desforges-Boucher (2nd time) (1715–1790)
19 October 1757	6 September 1763	Jean-Baptiste Charles Bouvet de Lozier (2nd time) (1706–1788)
7 September 1763	14 October 1763	Jean Sentuary (1711–1784)
5 November 1763	1764	François Jacques Bertin (d'Avesnes) (b. XVII century)
French crown colony		François Jacques Bertin (d'Avesnes) (b. XVII century)
1764	30 March 1767	François Jacques Bertin (d'Avesnes) (b. XVII century)
31 March 1767	4 November 1767	Martin Adrien Bellier (1718–1793)

== On behalf of the king of France (1767–1790) ==
Start	End	Governor
4 November 1767	26 July 1772	Guillaume Léonard de Bellecombe (1728–1792)
20 October 1772	4 March 1773	De Savourin
27 July 1773	4 October 1773	Guillaume Léonard de Bellecombe (1728–1792)
15 December 1773	15 October 1776	Jean Guillaume (de) Steynauer
26 October 1776	30 April 1779	François de Souillac (1732–1803)
25 May 1779	22 August 1781	Joseph Murinay, comte de Saint-Maurice
25 August 1781	21 April 1785	(André) Joseph (François) Chalvet, baron de Souville
2 May 1785	15 February 1788	(Claude) Élie Dioré (de Périgny) (1727-1803)
21 February 1788	15 August 1790	David Charpentier de Cossigny (1740–1801)

== During the French Revolution (1790–1810) ==
Start	End	Governor
8 September 1790	18 October 1792	Dominique Prosper de Chermont (1741–1798)
19 October 1792	19 March 1793	Jean-Baptiste Vigoureux Duplessis (1735–1825)
Île Bourbon renamed Île de la Réunion (sometimes called Réunion des Patriotes)		Jean-Baptiste Vigoureux Duplessis (1735–1825)
19 March 1793	11 April 1794	Jean-Baptiste Vigoureux Duplessis (1735–1825)
12 April 1794	1 November 1795	Pierre Alexandre Roubaud (b. XVII century)
2 November 1795	3 February 1803	Philippe Antoine Jacob de Cordemoy (1735–1820)
Part of the French colony of Indes-Orientales		Philippe Antoine Jacob de Cordemoy (1735–1820)
3 February 1803	7 October 1803	Philippe Antoine Jacob de Cordemoy (1735–1820)
10 November 1803	31 December 1805	François-Louis Magallon (1754–1825)
9 January 1806	15 August 1806	Nicolas Ernault des Bruslys (1757–1809)
Île de la Réunion renamed Île Bonaparte		Nicolas Ernault des Bruslys (1757–1809)
15 August 1806	25 September 1809	Nicolas Ernault des Bruslys (1757–1809)
9 October 1809	8 July 1810	Jean-Chrysostôme Bruneteau de Sainte-Suzanne (1773–1820)

== Occupation by United Kingdom (1810–1815) ==
Start	End	Governor
9 July 1810	7 August 1810	Robert Townsend Farquhar (1st time) (1776–1830)
Île Bonaparte renamed Île Bourbon		Robert Townsend Farquhar (1st time) (1776–1830)
7 August 1810	20 December 1810	Robert Townsend Farquhar (1st time) (1776–1830)
20 December 1810	26 April 1811	Henry Sheehy Keating (1st time) (1775–1847)
26 April 1811	10 July 1811	Robert Townsend Farquhar (2nd time) (1776–1830)
10 July 1811	5 April 1815	Henry Sheehy Keating (2nd time) (1775–1847)

== From the Restoration to the Second Empire (1815–1875) ==
Start	End	Governor
French Suzerainty
6 April 1815	30 June 1817	Athanase Hyacinthe Bouvet de Lozier (1777–1854)
1 July 1817	9 September 1818	Hilaire Urbain de Laffite du Courteil (b. XVIII century)
13 September 1818	14 February 1821	Pierre Bernard (de) Milius (1773–1829)
15 February 1821	14 October 1826	Louis(-)Henri (de Saulces) de Freycinet (1777–1840)
20 October 1826	4 July 1830	Achille Guy Marie (de Penfentenio), Comte de Cheffontaines (1766–1835)
5 July 1830	7 November 1832	Étienne-Henri Mengin du Val d'Ailly/Valdailly (1778–1865)
8 November 1832	4 May 1838	Jacques Philippe Cuvillier (1774–1857)
5 May 1838	14 October 1841	Anne Chrétien Louis de Hell (1783–1864)
15 October 1841	4 June 1846	Charles Louis Joseph Bazoche (1784–1853)
5 June 1846	6 September 1848	(Emmanuel François) Joseph Graeb (1790–1850)
Île Bourbon renamed Réunion		(Emmanuel François) Joseph Graeb (1790–1850)
6 September 1848	13 October 1848	(Emmanuel François) Joseph Graeb (1790–1850)
13 October 1848	7 March 1850	Joseph Napoléon Sébastien Sarda Garriga (1808–1877)
9 March 1850	15 April 1850 or 14 February 1851	Marie-Bon-Ézéchiel Barolet de Puligny (1803–1877)
15 February 1851 or 15 April 1850	8 August 1852	Louis Isaac Pierre Hilaire Doret (1789–1866)
8 August 1852	8 January 1858	Louis Henri Hubert-Delisle (1811–1881)
11 January 1858	27 March 1858	Lefevre (b. XVIII century)
28 March 1858	19 September 1863 or 1864	Rodolphe Augustin, baron Darricau (1807–1877)
4 January 1865	23 September or October 1869	Marie Jules Dupré (1813–1881)
27 September 1869	18 September 1875	Louis Hippolyte de Lormel (1809–1888)

== Under the Third Republic (1875–present) ==
Start	End	Governor
19 November 1875	29 April 1879	Pierre Aristide Faron (1814–1889)
6 May 1879	23 March 1886	Pierre Étienne Cuinier (1824–1888)
23 March 1886	11 October 1886	Jean-Baptiste Antoine Lougnon (interim) (b. XIX century)
11 October 1886	16 December 1887	Étienne Richaud (1841–1889)
16 December 1887	21 August 1888	Jean Baptiste Antoine Lougnon (non-interim) (b. XIX century)
22 August 1888	7 May 1891	Édouard Manès (1835–1898)
7 May 1891	20 November 1891	Jean-Baptiste Antoine Lougnon (again?) (b. XIX century)
20 November 1891	10 July 1893	Édouard Manès (1835–1898)
11 July 1893	21 June 1895	Henri Éloi Danel (1850–1900)
22 June 1895	12 August 1895	Henri (Charles) Roberdeau (1849–1916)
13 August 1895	19 May 1896	Benedict Jacob de Cordemoy (b. XIX century)
19 May 1896	30 October 1900	Laurent Marie Émile Beauchamps (b. XIX century)
30 October 1900	19 February 1901	Charles André Madre (b. XIX century)
19 February 1901	29 July 1905	Paul Samary (1848–1911)
29 July 1905	30 August 1906	Fernand Théron (b. XIX century)
30 August 1906	7 November 1906	Marius Verignon (b. XIX century)
8 November 1906	27 December 1907	Adrien Jules Jean Bonhoure (1860–1929)
1 January 1908	19 March 1908	Henri Cor (1864–1932)
19 March 1908	18 January 1910	Camille (Lucien Xavier) Guy (1860–1929)
18 January 1910	17 September 1910	Philippe Émile Jullien (1845–1912)
11 July 1910	28 July 1910	Marie Joachim Stanislas Sice (b. XIX century)
18 September 1910	28 July 1912	François Pierre Rodier (b. XIX century)
30 August 1912	22 November 1913	Hubert Auguste Garbit (1869–1933)
23 November 1913	1 June 1919	Pierre Louis Alfred Duprat (1866–1953)
2 June 1919	26 July 1920	Victor Jean Brochard (interim) (b. XIX century)
27 July 1920	5 September 1922	Frédéric Estèbe (1863–1936)
6 September 1922	21 August 1923	Henri Cleret de Langavant (b. XIX century)
22 August 1923	2 October 1924	Maurice (Pierre) Lapalud (1868–1935)
31 March 1925	10 September 1928	Jules Vincent Repiquet (b. XIX century)
10 September 1928	17 May 1930	Louis Fabre (b. XIX century)
17 May 1930	28 November 1932	Jules Vincent Repiquet (b. XIX century)
29 November 1932	13 June 1934	Louis Fabre (b. XIX century)
14 June 1934	29 May 1936	Alphonse (Paul Albert) Choteau (b. XIX century)
29 May 1936	16 August 1936	Charles Victor Allard (b. XIX century)
17 August 1936	27 October 1938	Léon Hippolyte Truitard (b. XIX century)
28 October 1938	29 December 1939	Joseph Court (1882–1948)
30 December 1939	1 December 1942	Pierre Émile Aubert (Deposed after the liberation of Réunion by the Free French forces) (1888–1972)
1 December 1942	19 March 1946	André Capagorry (1894–1981)

Term	Incumbent	Notes
French overseas département
19 March 1946 to 17 July 1947	Jean Charles André Capagorry, Governor	
16 August 1947 to 1 June 1950	Paul Demange, Prefect	
1 June 1950 to 4 July 1952	Roland Luc Béchoff, Prefect	
4 July 1952 to 14 May 1956	Pierre Philip, Prefect	
12 June 1956 to 1 March 1963	Jean François Pierre Perreau-Pradier, Prefect	
1 March 1963 to 1 September 1966	Alfred Diefenbacher, Prefect	
11 September 1966 to 22 October 1969	Jean Vaudeville, Prefect	
29 October 1969 to 21 August 1972	Paul Cousseran, Prefect	
28 August 1972 to 14 April 1975	Claude Edmond Vieillescazes, Prefect	
14 April 1975 to 12 May 1977	Robert Lamy, Prefect	
16 May 1977 to 22 May 1980	Bernard Landouzy, Prefect	
29 May 1980 to 1 August 1981	Jacques Seval, Prefect	
1 August 1981 to 10 May 1982	Michel Francis Levallois, Prefect	
10 May 1982 to 15 March 1984	Michel Francis Levallois, Commissioner of the Republic	
26 March 1984 to 9 April 1986	Michel Blangy, Commissioner of the Republic	
9 April 1986 to 25 April 1986	Jean-Marc Rebière, acting Commissioner of the Republic	
25 April 1986 to 24 February 1988	Jean Anciaux, Commissioner of the Republic	
24 February 1988 to 11 September 1989	Jean Anciaux, Prefect	
11 September 1989 to 18 July 1991	Daniel Constantin, Prefect	
18 July 1991 to December 1992	Jacques Dewatre, Prefect	
2 December 1992 to 2 January 1995	Hubert Fournier, Prefect	
9 January 1995 to 27 November 1995	Pierre Steinmetz, Prefect	
27 November 1995 to 29 November 1995	Yves Dassonville, acting Prefect	1st time
29 November 1995 to 15 July 1998	Robert Pommies, Prefect	
15 July 1998 to 5 August 1998	Yves Dassonville, acting Prefect	2nd time
5 August 1998 to 2 July 2001	Jean Daubigny, Prefect	
2 July 2001 to 31 July 2001	Vincent Bouvier, acting Prefect	
31 July 2001 to 28 March 2003	Gonthier Friederici, Prefect	
French overseas region
28 March 2003 to 13 August 2004	Gonthier Friederici, Prefect	
13 August 2004 to 16 August 2004	Franck-Olivier Lachaud, acting Prefect	1st time
16 August 2004 to 4 June 2005	Dominique Vian, Prefect	
4 June 2005 to 16 July 2005	Franck-Olivier Lachaud, acting Prefect	2nd time
16 July 2005 to 22 August 2006	Laurent Cayrel, Prefect	
22 August 2006 to 28 August 2006	Franck-Olivier Lachaud, acting Prefect	3rd time
28 August 2006 to 20 January 2010	Pierre-Henry Maccioni, Prefect	Nominated Prefect of Val-d’Oise
20 January 2010 to 27 August 2012	Michel Lalande, Prefect	Former Prefect of Saône-et-Loire
27 August 2012 to 2 September 2014	Jean-Luc Marx, Prefect	Former Prefect of Allier
2 September 2014 to 24 May 2017	Dominique Sorain, Prefect	Former Prefect of Eure
24 May 2017 to 17 June 2019	Amaury de Saint-Quentin, Prefect	Former Prefect of Guadeloupe
17 June 2019 to present	Jacques Billant, Prefect	Former Prefect of Guadeloupe

== See also ==
- Politics of Réunion
- History of Réunion
- Governor-General of the Mascarene Islands
