= High Commissioner of the Republic in New Caledonia =

Representative of the French Republic in New Caledonia

High Commissioner of New Caledonia
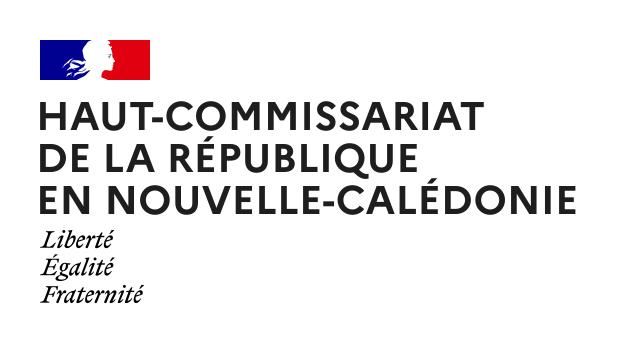
- Incumbent; Jacques Billant since 3 May 2025
- Residence: Haut-Commissariat, Nouméa
- Appointer: President of France
- Term length: Indefinite
- Inaugural holder: Auguste Febvrier Despointes
- Formation: 24 September 1853
- Website: www.nouvelle-caledonie.gouv.fr

The high commissioner of the Republic in New Caledonia is the representative of the French Republic in New Caledonia, with the rank of prefect. The high commissioner is generally referred to locally in the media as "Haussaire". Its competences since the Nouméa Accord of 1998 and the organic law on New Caledonia of 1999 have been reduced. The part of the organic law which regulates the position of high commissioner is Title VI.

The high commissioner is appointed by decree of the president of the French Republic deliberated in the Council of Ministers. They publishes the laws of the country with the countersignature of the president of the Government of New Caledonia. They ensures their publication, as well as any administrative regulations, in the official journal. He chairs the Mining Council. They are responsible for the organization of services falling within the regal powers of the State: in particular security and justice. They also manage the crisis cells linked to climatic events, such as cyclones. They attend by right the Committee of signatories of the Nouméa Accord and acts as the guarantor.

The position has been known by other titles since New Caledonia was taken over by France in 1853, first by the title of Commander from 1853 to 1860, then by Governor from 1860 to 1981 (who also bore the title of Commissioner General of the French Republic in the Pacific Ocean from 28 February 1901 and High Commissioner of France for the New Hebrides Archipelago from 11 January 1907, these two positions being held by the Governor until 1981. Jacques Billant is the current High Commissioner since 9 April 2025.

== List of officeholders ==
Term of office		Name	Title	Notes
French colony
24 September 1853	1 January 1854	Auguste Febvrier Despointes	Commandant	
1 January 1854	31 October 1854	Louis-Marie-François Tardy de Montravel	Commandant	
18 January 1855	28 October 1856	Joseph Fidèle Eugène du Bouzet	Commandant	
18 January 1855	21 December 1856	Jules Marcelin Albert Testard	acting Commandant	Acting for Bouzet to 28 October 1856
25 May 1856	5 May 1857	Le Bris	acting Commandant	Acting for Testard to 21 December 1856
21 December 1858	20 March 1859	Roussel	Commandant	
20 March 1859	1 July 1860	Jean Pierre Thomas Durand	Commandant	
22 May 1859	2 April 1860	Jean-Marie Saisset	acting Commandant	Acting for Durand
2 June 1862	13 March 1870	Charles Guillain	Governor	
13 March 1870	26 August 1870	Jacques Eugène Barnabé Ruillier	Governor	
26 August 1870	25 September 1874	Eugène Gaultier de la Richerie	Governor	
25 September 1874	27 February 1875	Louis Eugène Alleyron	Governor	
27 February 1875	11 April 1878	Léopold Eberhard Ludovic de Pritzbuer	Governor	
11 April 1878	8 August 1880	Jean Baptiste Léon Olry	Governor	
8 August 1880	29 September 1882	Amédée Courbet	Governor	
29 September 1882	22 July 1884	Léopold Augustin Charles Pallu de la Barrière	Governor	
22 July 1884	13 May 1886	Adolphe Le Boucher	Governor	
13 May 1886	5 June 1886	Orius	Governor	
5 June 1886	30 July 1888	Louis Hippolyte Marie Nouet	Governor	
30 July 1888	20 December 1888	Delphino Moracchini	Governor	
20 December 1888	12 January 1889	Pons	Governor	
12 January 1889	14 April 1891	Noël Pardon	Governor	
14 April 1891	16 December 1892	Émile Gustave Laffon	Governor	
16 December 1892	21 February 1894	Albert Jean Georges Marie Louis Picquié	Governor	
21 February 1894	10 June 1894	Gauharou	interim Governor	
10 June 1894	18 October 1902	Paul Théodore Ernest Marie Feillet	Governor	
5 June 1896	2 June 1897	Aristide Le Fol	acting Governor	Acting for Feillet
10 February 1900	12 December 1900	Colardeau	acting Governor	Acting for Feillet
13 December 1900	2 May 1901	Édouard Émile Léon Telle	acting Governor	1st time, acting for Feillet
22 October 1902	14 November 1902	Édouard Émile Léon Telle	Governor	2nd time
14 November 1902	17 May 1905	Édouard Picanon	acting Governor	
17 May 1905	17 September 1905	Charles Amédée Rognon	Governor	
17 September 1905	18 March 1908	Victor Théophile Liotard	Governor	
18 March 1908	24 May 1908	Pierre Brun	Governor	
24 May 1908	6 June 1913	Richard	Governor	
16 September 1909	6 July 1910	Adrien Jules Jean Bonhoure	acting Governor	Acting for Richard
6 June 1913	27 July 1914	Auguste Charles Désiré Emmanuel Brunet	Governor	
27 July 1914	15 August 1923	Jules Vincent Repiquet	Governor	
23 May 1919	6 January 1921	Joseph Marie Eugène Joulia	acting Governor	Acting for Repiquet
12 September 1923	14 March 1925	Henri Joseph Marie d'Arboussier	Governor	1st time
16 March 1925	2 July 1932	Marie Casimir Joseph Guyon	Governor	
29 May 1929	22 May 1930	Henri Joseph Marie d'Arboussier	acting Governor	2nd time, acting for Guyon
23 May 1930	20 December 1930	Gabriel Henri Joseph Thaly	acting Governor	Acting for Guyon
20 July 1932	6 April 1933	Léonce Alphonse Noël Henri Jore	Governor	1st time
3 May 1933	3 December 1936	Bernard Jacques Victorin Siadous	Governor	
6 December 1936	July 1938	Jean Marchessou	Governor	
July 1938	7 August 1939	Léonce Alphonse Noël Henri Jore	Governor	2nd time
7 August 1939	20 September 1939	René Victor Marie Barthes	Governor	
20 October 1939	4 September 1940	Marie Marc Georges Pelicier	Governor	
4 September 1940	19 September 1940	Maurice Denis	acting Governor	Removed in Australian-backed coup d'état
19 September 1940	6 May 1942	Henri Sautot	Governor	
29 July 1942	23 June 1943	Marie Henri Ferdinand Auguste Montchamp	Governor	
15 September 1943	13 February 1944	Christian Robert Roger Laigret	Governor	
14 February 1944	27 October 1946	Jacques Victor François Tallec	Governor	
French overseas territory
27 October 1946	28 January 1947	Jacques Victor François Tallec	Governor	
29 January 1947	10 May 1948	Georges Hubert Parisot	Governor	
10 May 1948	5 July 1951	Pierre Charles Cournarie	Governor	
5 July 1951	21 October 1951	Bordarier	Governor	
21 October 1951	24 July 1954	Raoul Eugène Angammare	Governor	
30 September 1954	3 February 1956	René Hoffherr	Governor	
2 March 1956	1 December 1958	Aimé Grimald	Governor	
1 December 1958	9 January 1963	Laurent Elisée Péchoux	Governor	
18 March 1961	20 July 1961	Georges Poulet	acting Governor	Acting for Pechoux
9 January 1963	14 February 1965	Marc Casimir Biros	Governor	
14 February 1965	16 October 1969	Jean Risterucci	Governor	
20 October 1969	1 December 1973	Louis Verger	Governor	
9 January 1974	16 December 1978	Jean Gabriel Ériau	Governor	
16 December 1978	11 December 1981	Claude Charbonniaud	Governor	
19 December 1981	22 October 1982	Christian Léon Colombo Nucci	High Commissioner	
October 1982	23 November 1984	Jacques Roynette	High Commissioner	
Autonomy granted
23 November 1984	5 December 1984	Jacques Roynette	High Commissioner	
January 1985	22 May 1985	Edgard Pisani	High Commissioner	
31 May 1985	1 August 1986	Fernand Wibaux	High Commissioner	
1 August 1986	12 August 1986	Bernard Lemaire	acting High Commissioner	
12 August 1986	28 November 1987	Jean Montpezat	High Commissioner	
1 December 1987	26 June 1988	Clément Bouhin	High Commissioner	
Matignon Accords increase territorial autonomy
26 June 1988	15 July 1988	Clément Bouhin	High Commissioner	
15 July 1988	11 January 1991	Bernard Grasset	High Commissioner	
15 January 1991	29 July 1994	Alain Christnacht	High Commissioner	
29 July 1994	12 August 1994	Thierry Lataste	acting High Commissioner	1st time
12 August 1994	16 August 1995	Didier Cultiaux	High Commissioner	
16 August 1995	18 August 1995	Laurent Cayrel	acting High Commissioner	
18 August 1995	20 July 1998	Dominique Bur	High Commissioner	
French sui generis overseas collectivity
20 July 1998	15 July 1999	Dominique Bur	High Commissioner	
19 July 1999	29 July 2002	Thierry Lataste	High Commissioner	2nd time
29 July 2002	31 July 2002	Alain Triolle	acting High Commissioner	
31 July 2002	6 September 2005	Daniel Constantin	High Commissioner	
6 September 2005	9 September 2005	Louis Le Franc	acting High Commissioner	1st time
9 September 2005	15 October 2007	Michel Mathieu	High Commissioner	
15 October 2007	25 October 2007	Jean-Bernard Bobin	acting High Commissioner	
25 October 2007	21 October 2010	Yves Dassonville	High Commissioner	
21 October 2010	2 November 2010	Thierry Suquet	acting High Commissioner	1st time
2 November 2010	2 February 2013	Albert Dupuy	High Commissioner	
2 February 2013	27 February 2013	Thierry Suquet	acting High Commissioner	2nd time
27 February 2013	23 July 2014	Jean-Jacques Brot	High Commissioner	
23 July 2014	18 August 2014	Pascal Gauci	acting High Commissioner	
18 August 2014	8? June 2016	Vincent Bouvier	High Commissioner	
8? June 2016	20 June 2016	Laurent Cabrera	acting High Commissioner	
20 June 2016	10 July 2019	Thierry Lataste	High Commissioner	3rd time
5 August 2019	6 June 2021	Laurent Prévost	High Commissioner	
6 June 2021	6 February 2023	Patrice Faure	High Commissioner	
6 February 2023	2 May 2025	Louis Le Franc	High Commissioner	2nd time
3 May 2025	Incumbent	Jacques Billant	High Commissioner	

== See also ==
- Politics of New Caledonia
- History of New Caledonia
