= Jean-François Toby =

Governor of French Polynesia
- In office 1954–1958
- Preceded by: René Petitbon
- Succeeded by: Pierre Sicaud

Governor of Ivory Coast
- In office 1943
- Preceded by: Georges-Pierre Rey
- Succeeded by: André-Jean-Gaston Latrille

Governor of Niger
- In office 1942–1954
- Preceded by: Maurice Falvy
- Succeeded by: Jean Ramadier

Personal details
- Born: 29 January 1900 Saint-Pierre-Quilbignon, France
- Died: 28 June 1964 (aged 64) Plougonvelin, France

Jean-François Toby (29 January 1900 – 28 June 1964) was a French colonial administrator who served as Governor of Niger, Ivory Coast and French Polynesia during the 1940s and 1950s.

== Biography ==
Toby was born in Saint-Pierre-Quilbignon (now part of Brest) in 1900. He attended the École nationale de la France d'Outre-Mer and later joined the colonial service in Africa. He was appointed Governor of Niger in 1942. In 1943 he was also briefly appointed Governor of Ivory Coast. He remained Governor of Niger until 1954, when he was appointed Governor of French Polynesia. He was succeeded by Pierre Sicaud in 1958.

Toby died in Plougonvelin in France in 1964 at the age of 64.
