= Michel Mathieu (French civil servant) =

French senior civil servant (1944–2010)

High Commissioner of the Republic in New Caledonia
- In office 18 July 2005 – 29 October 2007
- Preceded by: Daniel Constantin
- Succeeded by: Yves Dassonville

High Commissioner of the Republic in French Polynesia
- In office 26 October 2001 – 18 July 2005
- Preceded by: Jean Aribaud
- Succeeded by: Anne Boquet

Prefect of Val-d'Oise
- In office 24 June 1999 – 26 October 2005
- Preceded by: Jean-Pierre Lacroix
- Succeeded by: Jean-Michel Bérard

Prefect of Oise
- In office 6 August 1992 – 31 October 1996
- Preceded by: Philippe Massoni
- Succeeded by: Alain Géhin

Prefect of Eure
- In office 26 July 1989 – 6 August 1992
- Preceded by: Bernard Augustin
- Succeeded by: Jean François Seiller

Personal details
- Born: Michel Pierre Marie Mathieu; 25 July 1944 Montpellier, Hérault, France
- Died: 30 September 2010 (aged 66) Montpellier, Hérault, France
- Education: École nationale d'administration; Sciences Po; Institut des hautes études de la défense nationale
- Occupation: Civil servant

Michel Pierre Marie Mathieu (French pronunciation: [miʃɛl matjø]; 25 July 1944 – 30 September 2010) was a French senior civil servant. He was High Commissioner of New Caledonia from 2005 to 2007 when he notoriously resigned after a disagreement with then Overseas Secretary Christian Estrosi. He served previously as High Commissioner of the Republic in French Polynesia (Haut-Commissaire de la République en Polynésie française) from 2001 to 2005, when he was succeeded by Anne Boquet. He died in 2010.

== Honours and decorations ==
=== National honours ===
Ribbon bar	Honour
	Officer of the National Order of the Legion of Honour
	Officer of the National Order of Merit

=== Ministerial honours ===
Ribbon bar	Honour
	Officer of the Order of Agricultural Merit

=== Foreign honours ===
Ribbon bar	Honour
	Knight of the Order of Merit of the Federal Republic of Germany
