= Home port =

Port at which a ship or boat is based

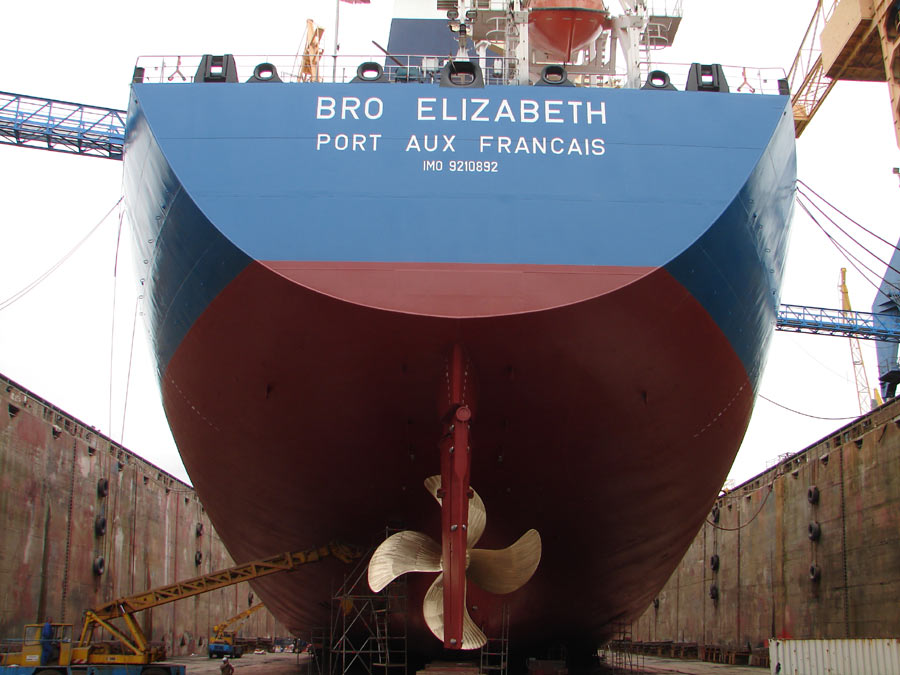
Port of registry Port aux Français lettered beneath the ship name on the stern

A vessel's home port is the port at which it is based, which may not be the same as its port of registry shown on its registration documents and lettered on the stern of the ship's hull. In the cruise industry the term "home port" is also often used in reference to the port in which a ship will take on/change over most of its passengers while taking on stores, supplies and fuel.

== Navy ==
In a navy, a ship's home port is the port best suited to provide maintenance and restock weaponry particular to ships of that class and build. On conclusion of a tour of duty, a combat vessel returning to port will usually return to its home port. A single home port also makes it easier for family to visit sailors on leave.

== See also ==
- List of largest container shipping companies
- Flag of convenience
