= Léonce Jore =

French colonial administrator

Leoncé Jore
- Jore at his official welcome to New Caledonia on 3 July 1938

Acting Lieutenant Governor of Niger
- In office 1923–1925
- Preceded by: Jules Brévié
- Succeeded by: Jules Brévié

Governor of Senegal
- In office 1926–1929
- Preceded by: Joseph Cadier
- Succeeded by: Maurice Beurnier

Governor of French Polynesia
- In office 1930–1932
- Preceded by: Joseph Louis Bouge
- Succeeded by: Alfred Léon Bouchet

Governor of New Caledonia Commissioner General in the Pacific High Commissioner to the New Hebrides
- In office 1938–1939
- Preceded by: Marie Casimir Joseph Guyon
- Succeeded by: Bernard Siadous

Governor of New Caledonia Commissioner General in the Pacific High Commissioner to the New Hebrides
- In office 1938–1939
- Preceded by: Jean Marchessou
- Succeeded by: René Barthes

Personal details
- Born: 21 May 1882; Hell-Ville, Madagascar
- Died: 29 September 1975 (aged 93); Vevey, Switzerland

Dr Léonce Alphonse Noël Henri Jore (21 May 1882 – 29 September 1975) was a French colonial administrator.

== Biography ==
Born in Hell-Ville on the Malagasy island of Nosy Be, Jore left school in 1900 and began his career in French West Africa, serving as Deputy District Administrator of Bamako from 1906 until 1906, before becoming Acting District Commander of Kita. He moved to Guadeloupe to become Private Secretary of Governor Victor Ballot in 1907, but returned to Africa the following year to become Resident in Fatick. He became District Commander of Dagana, before joining the Directorate of Administrative and Political Affairs of the Governor of French West Africa in 1909, where he worked until 1914. In 1911 he was awarded a PhD in political science by the University of Paris. Jore was Secretary-General of the Ivory Coast in 1918–19, before becoming an inspector for the High Commissioner of the French Mandate for Syria and the Lebanon.

In 1923 Jore was appointed Acting Lieutenant Governor of Niger, a role he held until 1925. Between 1926 and 1929 he was Governor of Senegal. He then moved to the Pacific, serving as Governor of French Polynesia from 1930 until 1932, and Governor of New Caledonia, Commissioner General in the Pacific and High Commissioner to the New Hebrides from 1932 until 1933. He then returned to Madagascar as Secretary General between 1934 and 1936. He subsequently returned to New Caledonia to reprise his previous roles from 1938 until 1939.
