= List of colonial and departmental heads of French Polynesia =

High Commissioner of the Republic in French Polynesia
- Haut-commissaire de la République en Polynésie française (French)
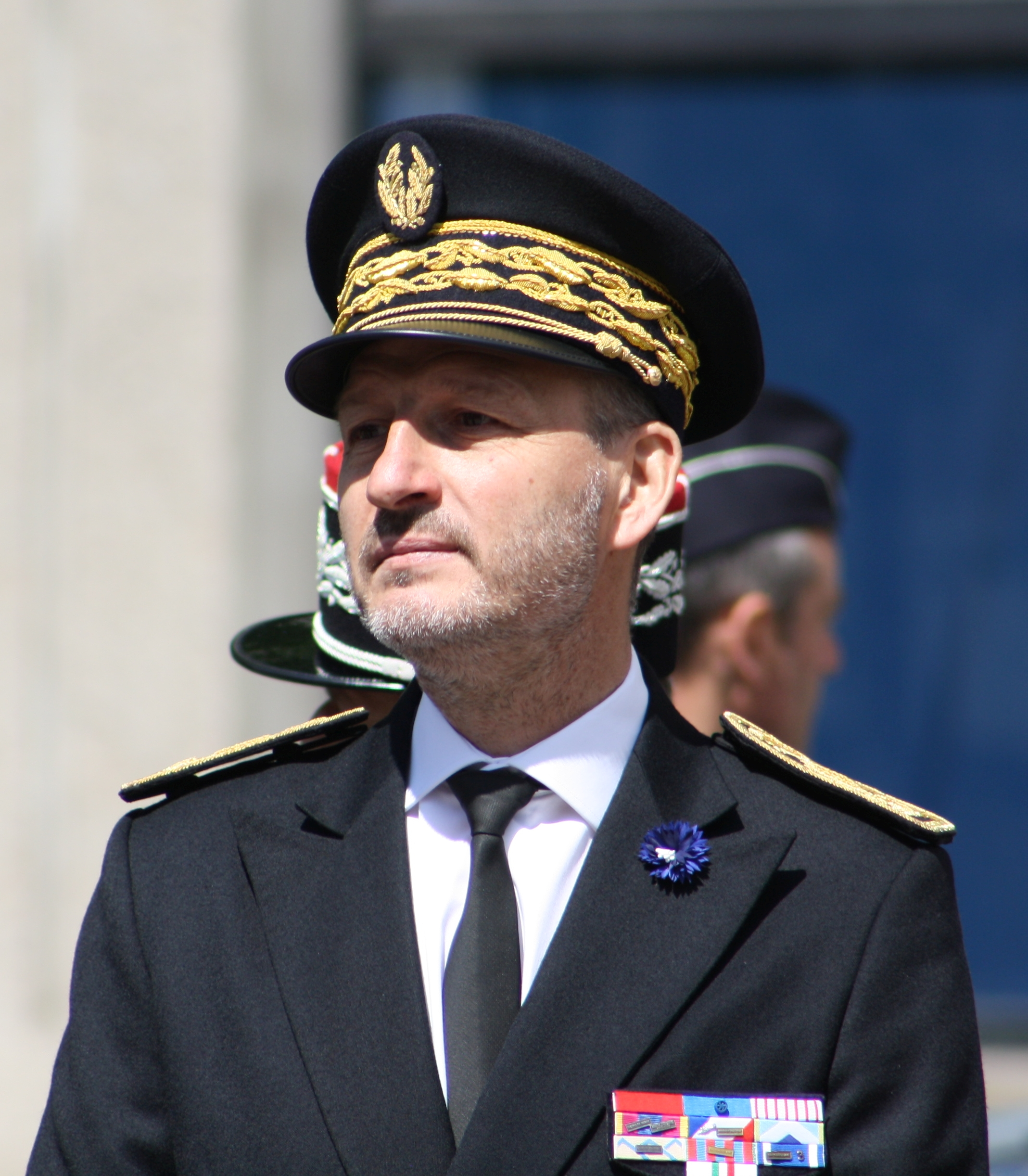
- Incumbent; Alexandre Rochatte since 1 September 2025
- Seat: Haut-Commissariat, Papeete, Tahiti
- Appointer: President of the French Republic
- Formation: 8 January 1843 (Commissioner); 6 September 1881 (Governor); 13 July 1977 (High-Commissioner)
- First holder: Armand Joseph Bruat
- Deputy: General Secretary of the High Commission
- Website: www.polynesie-francaise.pref.gouv.fr

The high commissioner of the Republic in French Polynesia (French: Haut-commissaire de la République en Polynésie française) is the highest representative of the French Republic in the overseas country of French Polynesia. The office is equivalent to that of a prefect (French: Préfet) and its powers are governed by Organic Law 2004–192. The high commissioner is directly appointed by the president of the French Republic.

The high commissioner can enact local laws (known as Lois du Pays) with the countersignature of the president of French Polynesia, and must ensure their publication in the Journal Officiel de la Polynésie française. He is competent for all matters not devolved to the Government of French Polynesia. Until 1984, he had assumed the powers now devolved to and exercised by the president of French Polynesia.

The overseas minor territory of Clipperton Island falls also under the jurisdiction of the high commissioner; it is uninhabited and has no local administration.

The official residence and the office of the high commissioner are at the Haut-Commissariat in Papeete.

== List of state representatives in French Polynesia ==
The chief representative of the French Government in French Polynesia has held different titles throughout history. During the period of the protectorate of the Kingdom of Tahiti, this title reflected the political regime of France:

- Commissioner of the King (1842–1848)
- Commissioner of the Republic (1848–1852)
- Commissioner of the Empire (1852–1870)
- Commissioner of the Republic (1870–1880)

After the final annexation of Tahiti by the French Third Republic, the Kingdom of Tahiti was dissolved and the French Establishments of Oceania were created. The state representative was titled governor until 13 July 1977, when the present title, High Commissioner of the Republic, was adopted.

Term of office		Name	Title
French Protectorate of the Kingdom of Tahiti – Marquesas Islands annexed by the Kingdom of France
8 January 1843	6 September 1846	Armand Joseph Bruat	Commissioner of the King
6 September 1846	?? ?? 1850	Charles François Lavaud	Commissioner of the King, later Commissioner of the Republic
?? ?? 1850	5 September 1851	Louis Adolphe Bonard	Commissioner of the Republic
5 September 1851	22 Mars 1854	Théogène François Page	Commissioner of the Empire
22 Mars 1854	19 May 1858	Joseph Fidèl Eugène du Bouzet	Commissioner of the Empire
19 May 1858	25 June 1858	Jean-Marie Joseph Théodore Saisset de Mars	Commissioner of the Empire
25 June 1858	11 October 1864	Louis Eugène Gaultier de La Richerie	Commissioner of the Empire
11 October 1864	6 June 1869	Émile François Guillaume Clément de La Roncière	Commissioner of the Empire
6 June 1869	1 June 1871	Michel Louis Isidore de Jouslard	Commissioner of the Empire, later Commissioner of the Republic
1 June 1871	?? ?? 1873	Hippolyte Auguste Girard	Commissioner of the Republic
?? ?? 1873	17 April 1876	Octave Bernard Gilbert-Pierre	Commissioner of the Republic
17 April 1876	25 August 1877	Antoine-Léonce Michaux	Commissioner of the Republic
25 August 1877	?? ?? 1877	Joseph Henri Brunet-Millet	Commissioner of the Republic
?? ?? 1877	5 February 1878	Auguste Marie Édouard d'Oncieu de la Bâthie	acting Commissioner of the Republic
5 February 1878	24 February 1880	Jacques Ferdinand Planche	Commissioner of the Republic
24 February 1880	6 September 1881	Henri Isidore Chessé	Commissioner of the Republic
French Establishments of Oceania – Tahiti and its islands annexed by the French Third Republic
6 September 1881	8 October 1883	Frédéric Jean Dorlodot des Essarts	Governor
8 October 1883	1 December 1885	Marie Nicolas François Auguste Morau	Governor
1 December 1885	2 September 1886	Delphino Moracchini	acting Governor
2 September 1886	29 October 1889	Étienne Théodore Mondésir Lacascade	Governor
29 October 1889	1 July 1890	Maurice d'Ingremard	acting Governor
1 July 1890	4 June 1893	Étienne Théodore Mondésir Lacascade	Governor
4 June 1893	24 October 1893	Adolphe Jean Granier de Cassagnac	acting Governor
24 October 1893	7 December 1893	Lucien Jules Léon Bommier	acting Governor
7 December 1893	29 April 1894	Jean Joseph Aimé Ours	acting Governor
29 April 1894	1 April 1896	Pierre Louis Clovis Papinaud	Governor
1 April 1896	31 January 1897	Gustave Pierre Théodore Gallet	acting Governor
31 January 1897	1 February 1898	Marie Louis Gustave Gabrié	Governor
1 February 1898	25 Mars 1899	Gustave Pierre Théodore Gallet	Governor
25 Mars 1899	14 July 1899	Joseph-Marie de Pous	acting Governor
14 July 1899	30 November 1899	Victor François Ferdinand Rey	acting Governor
30 November 1899	19 January 1900	Gustave Pierre Théodore Gallet	Governor
19 January 1900	25 February 1901	Victor François Ferdinand Rey	acting Governor
25 February 1901	?? ?? 1904	Édouard Georges Théophile Petit	Governor
?? ?? 1904	5 February 1904	Victor Louis Marie Lanrezac	acting Governor
5 February 1904	20 February 1905	Henri François Charles Cor	acting Governor
20 February 1905	28 March 1907	Philippe Émile Jullien	Governor
28 March 1907	4 December 1908	Élie Adrien Édouard Charuer	acting Governor
4 December 1908	12 August 1910	Joseph Pascal François	Governor
12 August 1910	6 April 1912	Adrien Jules Jean Bonhoure	Governor
6 April 1912	4 August 1912	Charles Hostein	acting Governor
4 August 1912	4 August 1913	Baptiste Léon Géraud	acting Governor
4 August 1913	21 September 1915	William Maurice Fawtier	Governor
21 September 1915	16 April 1919	Gustave-Jacques-Henri Julien	Governor
16 April 1919	17 May 1919	Simoneau	acting Governor
17 May 1919	13 February 1921	Jocelyn Robert	acting Governor
13 February 1921	10 April 1921	Gabriel Henri Joseph Thaly	acting Governor
10 April 1921	17 October 1921	Auguste André Marius Guédès	Governor
17 October 1921	18 September 1922	Gabriel Henri Joseph Thaly	acting Governor
18 September 1922	7 January 1927	Louis Félix Marie Édouard Rivet	Governor
7 January 1927	30 April 1928	Jean Baptiste Dominique Solari	acting Governor
30 April 1928	21 June 1930	Joseph Louis Bouge	acting Governor
21 June 1930	18 June 1932	Léonce Alphonse Noël Henri Jore	Governor
18 June 1932	17 June 1933	Alfred Léon Bouchet	acting Governor
17 June 1933	9 May 1935	Michel Lucien Montagné	Governor
9 May 1935	17 March 1937	Henri Sautot	acting Governor
17 March 1937	4 September 1940	Frédéric Marie Jean-Baptiste Chastenet de Géry	Governor
4 September 1940	14 September 1940	Édouard Ahnne; Georges Lagarde; Émile Martin; Georges Bambridge; Teriieroo a Teriierooiterai	Provisional Government
14 September 1940	6 November 1940	Edmond Mansard	Governor
6 November 1940	16 June 1941	Émile de Curton	Governor
16 June 1941	1 October 1941	Richard Brunot	Governor
1 October 1941	?? June 1945	Georges Louis Joseph Orselli	Governor
?? June 1945	27 October 1946	Jean-Camille Haumant	acting Governor
French Establishments of Oceania – Overseas territory of the French Republic
27 October 1946	10 August 1947	Jean-Camille Haumant	Governor
10 August 1947	2 April 1949	Pierre Louis Maestracci	Governor
2 April 1949	?? ?? 1950	Armand Anziani	Governor
?? ?? 1950	30 November 1950	Louis Girault	acting Governor
30 November 1950	28 September 1954	René Petitbon	Governor
28 September 1954	22 July 1957	Jean-François Toby	Governor
French Polynesia – Overseas territory of the French Republic
22 July 1957	7 March 1958	Jean-François Toby	Governor
7 March 1958	25 October 1958	Camille Victor Bailly	acting Governor
25 October 1958	12 December 1961	Pierre René Sicaud	Governor
12 December 1961	20 January 1965	Aimé Grimald	Governor
20 January 1965	11 March 1969	Jean Charles Sicurani	Governor
11 March 1969	1 August 1973	Pierre Louis Angeli	Governor
11 August 1973	1 January 1976	Daniel Videau	Governor
1 January 1976	1 November 1977	Charles Schmitt	Governor, later High Commissioner of the Republic
1 November 1977	16 July 1981	Paul Cousseran	High Commissioner of the Republic
16 July 1981	15 January 1983	Paul Noirot-Cosson	High Commissioner of the Republic
15 January 1983	9 March 1985	Alain Robert Lucien Ohrel	High Commissioner of the Republic
9 March 1985	9 April 1986	Bernard Gérard	High Commissioner of the Republic
9 April 1986	17 November 1987	Pierre Louis Angéli	High Commissioner of the Republic
17 November 1987	3 January 1992	Jean Montpezat	High Commissioner of the Republic
3 January 1992	8 August 1994	Michel Jau	High Commissioner of the Republic
8 August 1994	9 October 1997	Paul Roncière	High Commissioner of the Republic
9 October 1997	26 October 2001	Jean Aribaud	High Commissioner of the Republic
26 October 2001	28 March 2003	Michel Mathieu	High Commissioner of the Republic
French Polynesia – Overseas collectivity of the French Republic
28 March 2003	27 February 2004	Michel Mathieu	High Commissioner of the Republic
French Polynesia – Overseas country of the French Republic
27 February 2004	18 July 2005	Michel Mathieu	High Commissioner of the Republic
18 July 2005	13 June 2008	Anne Boquet	High Commissioner of the Republic
13 June 2008	23 December 2010	Adolphe Colrat	High Commissioner of the Republic
23 December 2010	1 August 2012	Richard Didier	High Commissioner of the Republic
1 August 2012	22 August 2013	Jean-Pierre Laflaquière	High Commissioner of the Republic
22 August 2013	6 May 2016	Lionel Beffre	High Commissioner of the Republic
6 May 2016	7 June 2019	René Bidal	High Commissioner of the Republic
10 July 2019	26 September 2022	Dominique Sorain	High Commissioner of the Republic
26 September 2022	1 September 2025	Eric Spitz	High Commissioner of the Republic
1 September 2025	Incumbent	Alexandre Rochatte	High Commissioner of the Republic

== See also ==
- Politics of French Polynesia
- Kingdom of Tahiti
  - List of monarchs of Tahiti
- President of French Polynesia
- Vice-President of French Polynesia
