= Venel =

Venel is a surname. Notable people with the surname include:

- Gabriel François Venel (1723–1775), French chemist and physician
- Jean-Jacques Challet-Venel (1811–1893), Swiss politician
- Paul Venel (1864–1920), French army officer and colonial governor
- Teddy Venel (born 1985), French sprinter
