= Jacques Billant =

French senior civil servant (born 1960)

High Commissioner of the Republic in New Caledonia
- Incumbent
- Assumed office 3 May 2025
- Preceded by: Louis Le Franc

Prefect of Réunion
- In office 17 June 2019 – 1 August 2022
- Preceded by: Amaury de Saint-Quentin

Prefect of Puy-de-Dôme
- In office 4 September 2017 – 10 December 2018
- Preceded by: Danièle Polvé-Montmasson
- Succeeded by: Anne-Gaëlle Baudouin-Clerc

Prefect of Guadeloupe
- In office 12 November 2014 – 4 September 2017
- Preceded by: Marcelle Pierrot
- Succeeded by: Éric Maire

Personal details
- Born: 1963 (age 62–63) Auch, Gers, France

Jacques Billant (French pronunciation: [ʒak bijɑ̃]; born January 1960) is a French civil servant who has been the High Commissioner of the Republic in New Caledonia since 2025. Prior to his tenure in New Caledonia, he held the position of prefect in several departments, including Ariège, Dordogne, Guadeloupe, Puy-de-Dôme, Réunion, and Pas-de-Calais. He was an officer in the French Army, where he trained engineering corps commanders.

== Early life and education ==
Jacques Billant was born in January 1960. He graduated from the École spéciale militaire de Saint-Cyr and served as an officer in the French Army. From 1993 to 1994, he was the head of a regimental training office. He trained engineering corps commanders at the Higher and Applied Engineering School from 1994 to 1997.

== Career ==
Billant served as the sub-prefect of Neufchâteau, Vosges from 2000 to 2002. He was the head of Minister of the Interior Marie-Josée Roig's office in 2005. He was chief of staff for the prefect of Alpes-Maritimes from 2007 to 2008. He was chief of staff to Minister of Justice Rachida Dati from 2008 to 2009.

Billant held the position of prefect of Ariège from 2009 to 2011, and of Dordogne from 2011 to 2014. President François Hollande appointed him prefect of Guadeloupe on 12 November 2014.

President Emmanuel Macron appointed Billant as prefect of Puy-de-Dôme on 9 August 2017, and he took office on 4 September. Macron appointed him as prefect of Réunion on 29 May 2019, and he assumed office on 17 June. He was appointed prefect of Pas-de-Calais in 2022.

He succeeded Louis Le Franc as High Commissioner of the Republic in New Caledonia on 9 April 2025.

== Honors and Awards ==
- Officer of the Order of Legion of Honour
- Commander of the Ordre National du Mérite

== Works cited ==
=== News ===
- "Jacques Billant nommé préfet de La Réunion à compter du 17 juin". Zinfos974. 29 May 2019. Archived from the original on 10 November 2023.
- Chenais, Stephanie (10 April 2025). "Le préfet Jacques Billant nommé haut-commissaire de la Nouvelle-Calédonie". Nouvelle-Calédonie La Première.

=== Web ===
- "Décret du 12 novembre 2014 portant nomination du préfet de la région Guadeloupe, préfet de la Guadeloupe, en outre représentant de l'Etat dans les collectivités de Saint-Barthélemy et de Saint-Martin - M. BILLANT (Jacques)". Légifrance. Archived from the original on 10 November 2023.
- "Décret du 9 août 2017 portant nomination du préfet du Puy-de-Dôme - M. BILLANT (Jacques)". Légifrance. Archived from the original on 10 November 2023.
- "Décret du 29 mai 2019 portant nomination du préfet de la région Réunion, préfet de La Réunion (hors classe) - M. BILLANT (Jacques)". Légifrance. Archived from the original on 4 January 2023.
