= Daniel Constantin =

Daniel Constantin may refer to:

- Daniel Constantin (administrator) (born 1940), French civil servant
- Daniel Constantin (politician) (born 1978), Romanian politician
- Constantin Daniel (Romanian physician, historian and orientalist, 1914–1987)
