= Anne Boquet =

French senior civil servant

Prefect of Côte-d'Or
- In office 25 November 2010 – 16 November 2011
- Preceded by: Christian Galliard de Lavernée
- Succeeded by: Pascal Mailhos

Prefect of Yvelines
- In office 13 June 2008 – 25 November 2010
- Preceded by: Christian Galliard de Lavernée
- Succeeded by: Michel Jau

High Commissioner of the Republic in French Polynesia
- In office 18 July 2005 – 13 June 2008
- Preceded by: Michel Mathieu
- Succeeded by: Adolphe Colrat

Prefect of Yvelines
- In office 21 June 2000 – 10 October 2002
- Preceded by: Jean-Claude Vacher
- Succeeded by: Jean-François Tallec

Personal details
- Born: March 19, 1952 (age 74) Bellac, Haute-Vienne, France
- Education: École nationale d'administration

Anne Boquet (born 19 March 1952 in Bellac, France) is a retired French senior civil servant. She is the first and only woman to have been High Commissioner in French Polynesia to date.

Boquet had previously served as Secretary-General in the French High commission in Pape'ete from 1993 to 1996 and as Prefect in several French departments. Her administration as High Commissioner saw unprecedented political instability with the turnover of five successive governments and three separate presidents come and go due to votes of no confidence and party switching by top politicians in French Polynesia.

Boquet's term as High Commissioner in French Polynesia ended with her appointment as Prefect for the metropolitan department of the Yvelines in the Paris region on 28 June 2008.

She was awarded the rank of Commandeur of the Order of Tahiti Nui, which is French Polynesia's highest honor, in June 2008 for her service to the collectivity. French Polynesian President Gaston Tong Sang hailed Boquet's term and her action in "restoring dialogue" between French Polynesia and metropolitan France in a speech at the award ceremony.

Boquet stressed the importance of political stability as a precondition for future economic development in her final message before her departure from French Polynesia. "It must absolutely create a more positive climate of confidence for things to move ahead," she stated, "But I'm confident, (French Polynesians) are a strong people, even though the climate is not always easy...I'm confident and I call on (French Polynesians) to have faith in themselves too." She also noted that the future of French Polynesia lies with its young people.

== Honours and decorations ==
=== National honours ===
| Ribbon bar | Honour |
|---|---|
| | Commandeur of the National Order of the Legion of Honour |
| | Officer of the National Order of Merit |

=== Territorial honours ===
| Ribbon bar | Honour |
|---|---|
| | Commandeur of the Order of Tahiti Nui |
