= Édouard Manès =

Louis Evenor Édouard Manès (1835-1898) was Governor General for Inde française in the Second French Colonial Empire between 1886 and 1888. He was Governor of Reunion, a French Indian Ocean island, under Third Republic from 1888 to 1893.

== Titles held ==
Government offices
Preceded by Étienne Richaud	Gouverneur Général de l'Inde française 1886–1888	Succeeded by Georges Jules Piquet
