= List of colonial governors of Niger =

This is a List of Colonial Heads of Niger for the period of French Colonial rule. While French control of some of the areas of modern Niger began in the 1890s, a formal Military Territory of Zinder was formed on 23 July 1900. Full independence from France was declared on 03 August 1960 with the formation of the Nigerien First Republic.

Term	Serving
23 July 1900	French military territory declared ruling what is modern southern Niger: only nominal rule east of Zinder or north of Tanout
1900	"Zinder Military Territory": Includes parts of modern northeast Mali and Northern Chad
23 July 1900 to 1901	Étienne Péroz, Commandant
1903	"Zinder Military Territory": Capitol moved from Sorbo-Haoussa to Niamey
1902 to 1903	Henri Gouraud, Commandant
Oct 1904 to ?	? Noël, Commandant
	Joseph Gaudérique Aymerich, Commandant
	Lt. Colonel Lamolle, Commandant
22 June 1910	Niger Military Territory: Includes parts of modern northeast Mali and Northern Chad
1911	Capitol moved from Niamey to Zinder
?	Lt. Colonel Cristofari, Commandant
? to 1911	Paul Célestin Marie Joseph Venel, Commandant
21 June 1911	Cercle of Gao ceded to French Sudan
27 Sept 1911 to 1912	? Hocquart, Commandant
1912 to 1913	Charles Camille Thierry de Maugras, Commandant
4 Dec 1913 to 1915	Paul Célestin Marie Joseph Venel, Commandant
15 Nov 1915 to Jan 1918	Charles Henri Mourin, Commandant
24 Jan 1918 to 1919	Marie Joseph Félix Méchet, Commandant
Aug 1919 to 1920	Claude Paul Émile Lefebvre, Commandant
1920	Maurice Gustave Fernand Renauld, Commandant
5 Jul 1920 to 1921	Lucien Émile Rueff, Commandant
1921 to 26 Dec 1922	Jules Brévié, Commandant
13 October 1922	Colony of Niger: most of southern and western areas placed under civilian rule. Lieutenant governor reports to Governor General of French West Africa
1926	Capitol moved from Zinder to Niamey
26 Dec 1922 to 9 Oct 1929	Jules Brévié, Lieutenant governor
23 Mar 1923 to Sep 1925	Léonce Jore, Lieutenant governor (acting)
9 Oct 1929 to 21 Nov 1929	Jean Baptiste Robert Fayout, Lieutenant governor (acting)
1930	Tibesti Cercle ceded to Chad Colony
21 Nov 1929 to 30 Oct 1930	Alphonse Choteau, Lieutenant governor
30 Oct 1930 to 9 Sep 1931	Louis Placide Blacher, Lieutenant governors
1932	Cercles of Dori and Fada N'gourma ceded to Niger Colony
9 Sep 1931 to 25 May 1933	Théophile Antoine Pascal Tellier, Lieutenant governor
25 May 1933 to May 1934	Maurice Bourgine, Lieutenant governors
May 1934 to 16 Mar 1935	Léon Charles Alphonse Pêtre, Lieutenant governor
16 Mar 1935 to 29 Apr 1938	Joseph Court, Lieutenant governor
29 Apr 1938 to 18 Feb 1939	Jean-Baptiste Victor Chazelas, Lieutenant governor (acting)
18 Feb 1939 to 7 Nov 1940	Jean Rapenne, Lieutenant governor
7 Nov 1940 to 8 Dec 1940	Léon Solomiac, Lieutenant governor (acting)
8 Dec 1940 to 4 Mar 1942	Maurice Falvy, Lieutenant governor
31 December 1946	Military Territories of N'Guigmi and Agadez ceded to Niger Colony
1947	Cercles of Dori and Fada N'Gourma ceded to French Upper Volta Colony
4 Mar 1942 to May 1954	Jean-François Toby, Lieutenant governor: Acting to Dec 1942
11 Feb 1952 to 23 Feb 1953	Fernand Georges Gaston Casimir, Lieutenant governor (acting)
1956	Military Territory of Bilma ceded to Niger Colony
21 Dec 1954 to 3 Nov 1956	Jean Ramadier, Lieutenant governor
3 Nov 1956 to 29 Jan 1958	Paul Bordier, Lieutenant governor
29 Jan 1958 to 25 Aug 1958	Louis Félix Rollet, Lieutenant governor (acting)
December 1959	Lieutenant Governor becomes High Commissioner of Niger: Head of State
25 Aug 1958 to 10 Nov 1960	Jean Colombani, High commissioner

- For continuation after independence, see: Heads of state of Niger

== See also ==
- Niger
  - Heads of state of Niger
  - Presidents of Niger
- Lists of office-holders
