= Paul Venel =

French army officer and colonial governor

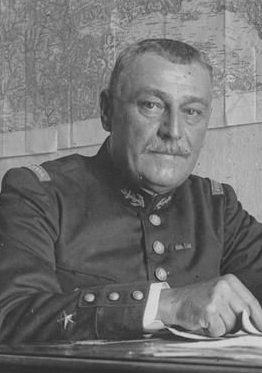
- Paul Venel in Larissa, June 1917
- Born: 25 January 1864; Hesse, France
- Died: 25 March 1920 (aged 56) Nancy, France
- Allegiance: France
- Service years: 1884–1918
- Rank: Brigadier general
- Commands: 97th Infantry Division; 11th Colonial Infantry Division
- Conflicts: World War I

Commandant of the Military Territory of Zinder
- In office 16 May 1908 – 15 February 1910

Commissioner of the Military Territory of Zinder
- In office 28 April 1913 – 4 October 1915
- Preceded by: Charles–Camille Thierry de Maugras
- Succeeded by: Charles–Henri Mourin

Paul Célestin Marie Joseph Venel (25 January 1864 – 25 March 1920) was a French army officer and colonial governor. He served as Commandant of the Military Territory of Zinder (modern-day Niger) from 1908 to 1911, and Commissioner from 1913 to 1915. Venel was in command of the 11th Colonial Infantry Division, part of the Corps expéditionnaire d'Orient, from August to November 1917, fighting in the Macedonian front.

== Early life and education ==
Paul Célestin Marie Joseph Venel was born on 25 January 1864 in Hesse, the son of Dominique Auguste Venel and Mélanie Béna. His father Auguste was a local teacher who opted for France and moved to Seichamps, after the annexation of a part of his native province by Germany following the Franco-Prussian War.

Paul enrolled at the Saint-Cyr military academy on 30 October 1882. He graduated 144th of 406 students in the promotion (class) "Black Pavillions".

== Service in the Marines ==
He became a sub-lieutenant in the 1st Marine Infantry Regiment in Cherbourg on 1 October 1884. Initially, Venel didn't display all the zeal required of an officer, but worked well under the guidance of an officer. He was dispatched to Cochinchina in 1885.

Twelve years later, he served for the first time in Eastern Europe, dispatched to Crete with his battalion. This majority Greek island revolted against the Ottoman Empire in 1896. Venel served as part of the International Squadron, a naval squadron formed in early 1897 by a number of Great Powers to intervene in the conflict. Embarking from Marseille on 15 July 1897, Venel arrived in Sitia on the 20th, but he was evacuated on 23 October for health reasons.

Assigned to the 1st Malagasy Tirailleur Regiment in Tamatave on 25 May 1898, he left the 8th Marine Infantry with a severe remark from the corps commander, chastising his work ethic. Arriving at Tamatave on 15 June, he was dispatched to the 13th Marine Regiment in Antananarivo on 1 September, where he was lauded as a suitable officer. Assigned to the area inhabited by the Bara in Ivohibe, he led a series of operations against the Tambavala in September 1899, a part of the pacification of French Madagascar. On 25 April 1900, he was transferred to the 4th Marine Infantry Regiment (renamed the 4th Colonial Garrison Regiment on 1 January 1901) at Toulon, promoted to chef de bataillon on 5 July, the day before his departure for France.

Assigned to the 4th Colonial Garrison Regiment, Venel was dispatched on 6 May to the 8th Army Regiment in Toulon, where he was rated as "excellent" during fall maneuvers. Returning to Saigon on 27 April 1902, he joined the 1st Regiment of Annamite Riflemen on October 28. He was detached to Chantaboun, a territory of the Kingdom of Siam occupied by the French army as a guarantee after the Franco-Siamese conflict of 1893. Venel usefully employed Siamese officers in local reconnaissance missions. He was reproached for his leniency towards an indigenous non-commissioned officer guilty of brutality against a rifleman in 1904.

== Governor of Niger ==
Venel was dispatched to Africa on 14 December 1905. He was assigned to the 2nd Tirailleur Regiment in Kati, commanding the area of Bobo-Dioulasso. He became lieutenant colonel on 23 June 1907.

On 16 May 1908 became commandant of the Military Territory of Zinder (today Niger) and went to serve his post at Zinder. He was responsible for the defense of 2200 km of Saharan border, as well as 800 km along British northern Nigeria. He met with François-Henry Laperrine in June 1909 in Niamey where they redrew the border between French Algeria and Niger. According to Venel's wishes, the capital of the Colony of Niger was transferred from Niamey to Zinder in 1911 and served as capital of the colony until 1926.

During his eighteen months of presence, he completed the organization of the méhariste units, which reestablished order in the Azbin and protected the subordinate population from looters. His troops were shown to be capable of inflicting serious setbacks on two strong rezzous (raiding parties). First, they clashed with a large band from Borkou and Tripolitania north of Bilma. After that, with a large gathering from Tafilalt around 600 kilometers north of Timbuktu. Venel subdued the Tuareg nomads, abolished the slave trade, and oversaw the economic growth of sedentary populations, allowing for the extraction of salt from the Taoudenni and Kaouar mines.

Paul left Niamey on 15 February 1910 to return to France. He then completed an internship with the 60th Artillery Regiment at Troyes, which he commanded several times and with which he attended the artillery shooting course at Mailly-le-Camp. On 21 December 1911, he joined the 4th Colonial Infantry Regiment in Toulon, where he was applauded for his mild approach to knowledge transfer to his subordinates.

After becoming colonel on 27 March 1913, Venel was appointed Commissioner of Niger on 28 April. He took his post at Zinder via Dakar and Dahomey. Immediately, he had to take care of the last details of the supply of the column situated on the western slope of the Tibesti Mountains. Once Germany declared war on 3 August 1914, he contributed to the war effort by operating numerous levies of personnel and material intended for reinforcement of the column operating in northern Cameroon.

Repatriated for health reasons after 28 months in Africa, he returned to Paris on 4 October 1915 via Lagos, England and Boulogne-sur-Mer. He immediately benefited from a three-month convalescent leave in Lyon, from 11 October 1915 to 10 January 1916, because of the various illnesses he suffered from, especially malaria and diabetes.

== World War I ==
On 15 January, Venel was put in command of the 97th Infantry Division, a unit of four battalions which contributed to the defense of a difficult sector north of Arras. He suffered through trench warfare at Givenchy-en-Gohelle and at Vimy Ridge in January and February 1916. After that, he was sent to Verdun, where he fought from 15 March to 5 April.

Hired on 16 March 1916 at Vaux-devant-Damloup and at the Dicourt Farm, he was withdrawn from the front on 3 April, before holding the sector of Flirey and Vargévaux Pond. On 20 May, Venel was given acting command of the 31st Colonial Brigade, serving in the Somme department. Withdrawn from the front in early June, he occupied the sector of Dompierre from 22 June. On 4 July, he participated in the Battle of the Somme, at Barleux on 10 July and at La Maisonnette on the 20th. Under these circumstances, Venel proved satisfactory. At the time of his departure, on 5 November, his superior judged him worthy of commanding a division.

Venel was appointed brigadier general on 1 October, when he took over the leadership of the 22nd Colonial Brigade (part of the Corps expéditionnaire d'Orient), created on the previous day in Toulouse, on 2 November, and landed in Thessaloniki in early December, before joining his men on the Battle of the Crna Bend.

The 21st and 22nd Colonial Brigades merged to form the 11th Colonial Infantry Division on 1 January 1917. The division occupied the sector between the river Crna and the Prilep road, north of Monastir. From 16 March it attempted to conquer Monastir, succeeding in seizing the town and the village of Krklino from 16 to 18 March. On 25 April it moved towards the Crna Bend and deeper into Pelagonia, retreating towards Barešani on 21 May.

On 1 June, Venel was put at the head of the provisional division of Thessaly, formed on 26 May. Greece was undergoing the National Schism, with King Constantine I favoring the Central Powers. On 11 June 1917, the representative of the Entente Charles Jonnart forced Constantine to abdicate in favor of his younger son Alexander. The former Prime Minister Eleftherios Venizelos, favorable to the Entente, returned to power. During this delicate transfer of power, Venel’s role was to monitor monarchist elements in Thessaly, while other Allied contingents landed in Athens or occupied the Isthmus of Corinth. His superior, General Maurice Sarrail, was satisfied with Venel completing this mission and wrote positively of him on 18 June. Venel then occupied the port of Volos, the cities of Farsala, Lamia, Trikala, and Bralos.

From 2 July to 15 August, Venel was again northeast of Monastir commanding the 22nd Colonial Brigade, provisionally added to the 11th Colonial Infantry Division. The front faced a certain lethargy, which lasted for months. Venel handed the command of his division over on 22 June 1918 and returned to France. At the disposal of the Ministry of War, Venel was placed in the command reserve for the 5th Army under General Henri Berthelot on 24 July. The 5th Army had just participated in the Second Battle of the Marne. On 17 September, he took over as acting head of the 127th Infantry Division, which held an area north of Sancy until the 20th.

This division immediately stood out in the pursuit of the German Army on the Chemin des Dames. It seized the fort of La Malmaison and crossed the Ailette on 12 October, taking part in the attacks against the Hunding-Stellung fortified line, taken on 19 and 20 October, and in the Battle of the Serre from 20 to 30 October, after which it was removed from the front. During these operations, Venel demonstrated great skill.

Evacuated for health reasons ("severe chest flu") on 8 November, he was replaced in his command two days later, hospitalized in Chartres and placed on 4 December at the disposal of the general commanding the French forces in Italy. He was appointed commander in the Corps expéditionnaire d'Orient, commanding the Allied occupation troops around Cattaro and Montenegro, where the situation was then very tense, culminating in the Christmas Uprising in late December. According to Franchet d'Espèrey, Venel "showed bravery and decisiveness by being skillful in the midst of the shooting between the two lines of combat". In actuality, Venel's troops, like France, favored Belgrade, and the Greens, loyalists of the exiled King Nicholas, were disarmed.

== Death ==
The harsh Montenegrin climate, as well as the quarrels between the Allies (especially Italians and Serbs), was detrimental to Venel's health. On a one-month rest leave on 21 April 1919 in Vichy (extended by another month on 21 May), he was appointed deputy to 1st Maritime Prefect in Cherbourg on 18 June. The very day he took up his post, 28 June, he was hospitalized for pulmonary congestion. He resumed command on 28 July, but returned to the local maritime hospital on 8 August.

On 23 August, the chief medical officer diagnosed pulmonary emphysema with "intermittent but very painful" asthma attacks and hypotension. Venel was then relieved of his duties and put on convalescent leave for three months on 2 September 1919. Still, he was proposed for the rank of division general on 9 November. Venel withdrew to Nancy, where he was granted extensions of leave (lasting one month, effective 2 March 1920 "on an exceptional basis due to service rendered"). On 19 March, the Minister of War, André Lefèvre urged him to retire.

Venel died a few days later from a heart condition at the Bon Secours hospital, Nancy, where he had been treated since January for chronic hypertensive nephritis, and where his right leg had just been amputated from the thigh down on 18 March after a dry gangrene coupled with arthritis caused complications with his femoral artery, in turn influenced by frostbite of the foot in 1917. On 17 April 1925, the medical advisory commission found that the illness causing the death of general Venel was not contracted during service.

Paul Venel was buried in Amance, next to his parents' grave.

== Decorations ==
- Legion of Honour
  - Knight (12 July 1901)
  - Officer (10 April 1915)
  - Commander (12 July 1917)
- Tonkin Expedition commemorative medal
- Colonial Medal with bars "Madagascar" (15 November 1899), "French West Africa" and "Sahara"
- Croix de guerre 1914–1918 with palms
- Order of the Star of Anjouan
  - Officer (15 May 1900)
- Royal Order of Cambodia
  - Officer (14 July 1894)
- Order of the Dragon of Annam
  - Officer (20 May 1896)
- Grand Commander of the Redeemer, Greece
- Officer of Karađorđe's Star, Serbia

== In popular culture ==
- Venel was portrayed by Mirza Halilović in the 2017 Montenegrin TV series Božićni ustanak (Christmas Uprising).
