= Amaury de Saint-Quentin =

French civil servant (born 1960)

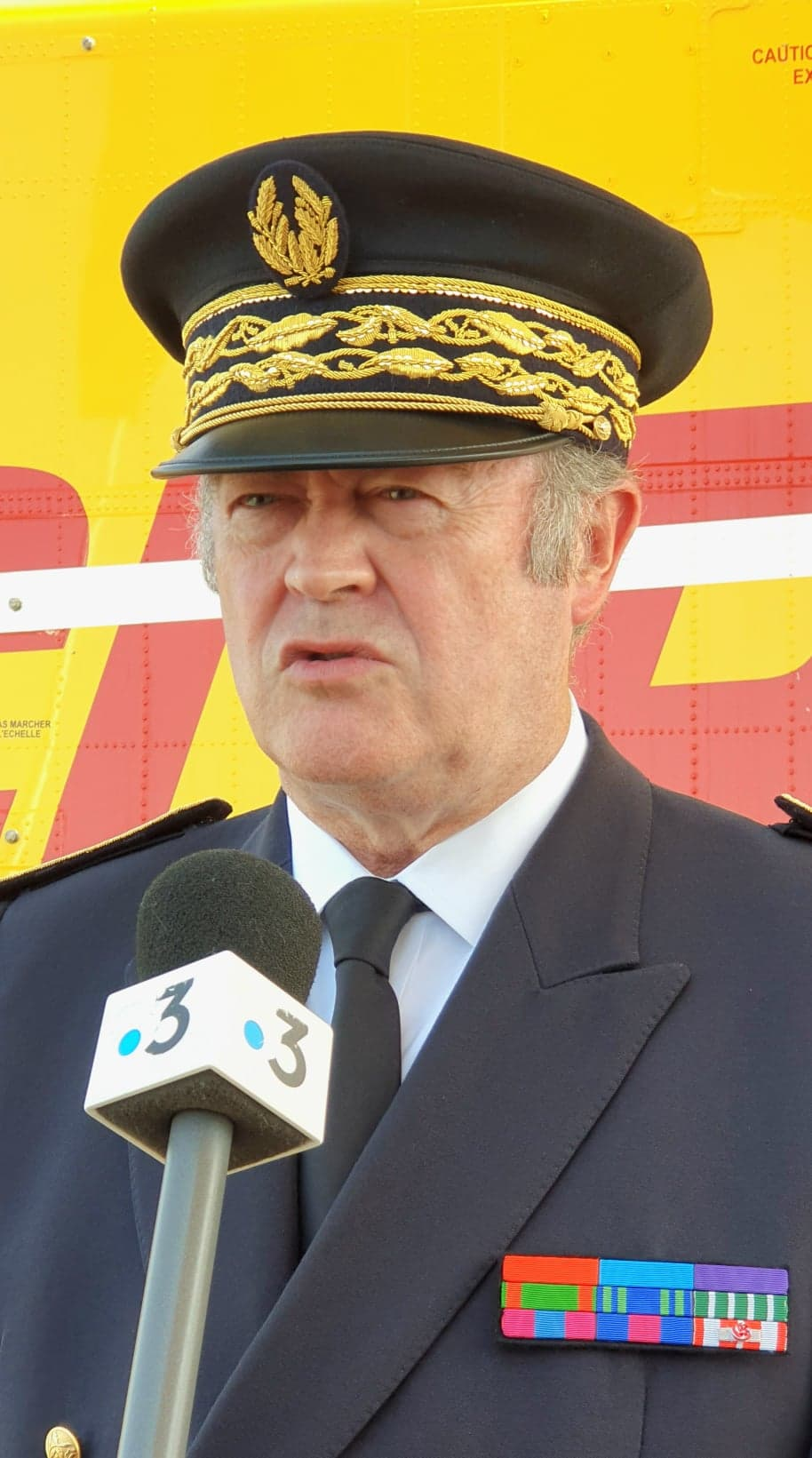

Prefect of Réunion
- In office 28 June 2017 – 17 June 2019
- President: Emmanuel Macron
- Preceded by: Dominique Sorain
- Succeeded by: Jacques Billant

Prefect of Guadeloupe
- In office 12 September 2011 – 23 January 2013
- President: Nicolas Sarkozy; François Hollande
- Preceded by: Jean-Luc Fabre
- Succeeded by: Marcelle Pierrot

Personal details
- Born: 24 December 1960 (age 65)

Amaury de Saint-Quentin (born 24 December 1960) is a French civil servant who has been serving as prefect of Brittany since 2024. From 2022 to 2024, he served as prefect of Corsica. From 2019 to 2022, he served as prefect of Val-d'Oise. From 2017 to 2019, he served as prefect of Réunion. From 2011 to 2013, he served as prefect of Guadeloupe. From 2009 to 2011, he served as prefect of Ardèche. From 1995 to 2000, he served as mayor of Putanges-Pont-Écrepin.
