= René Bidal =

French senior civil servant

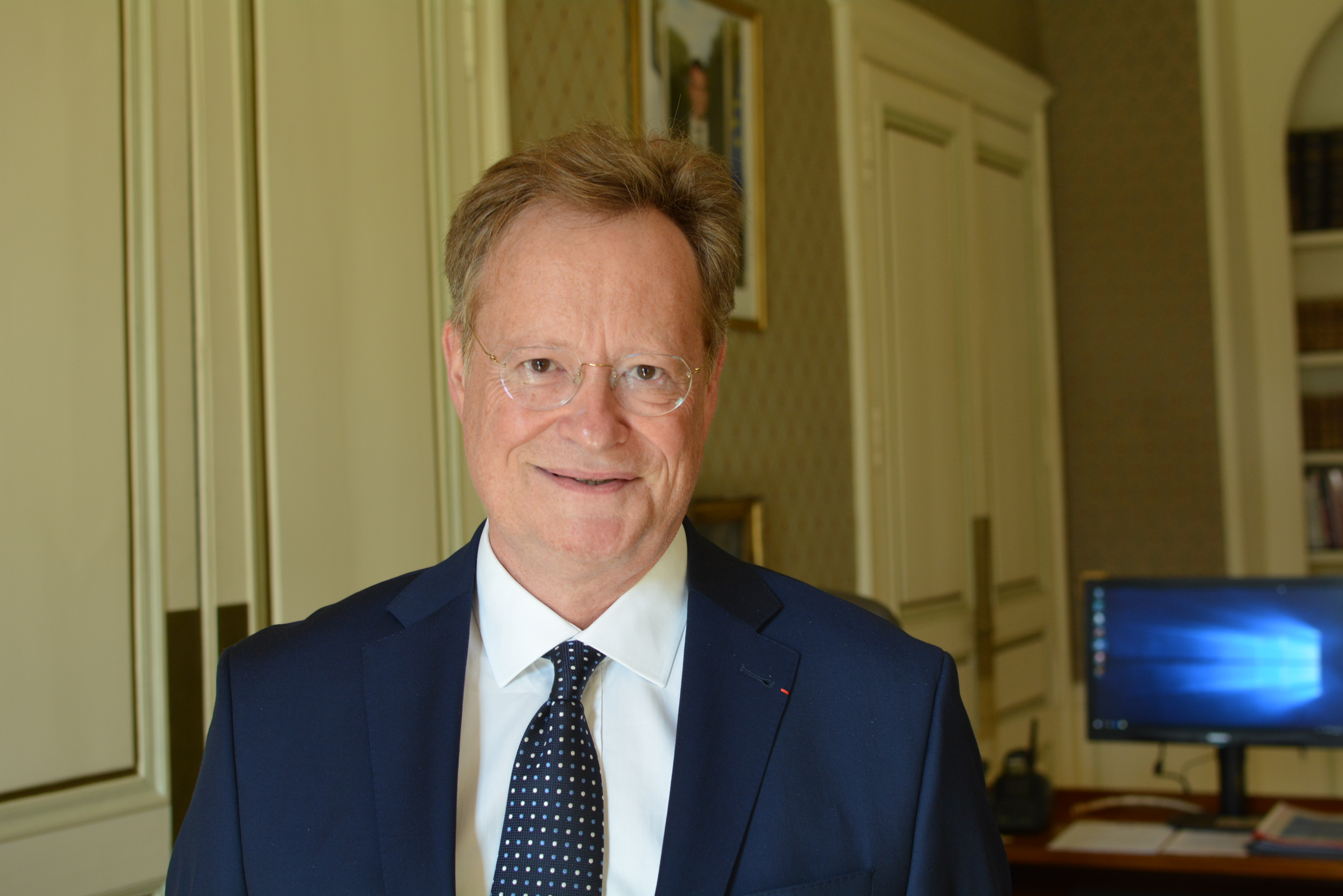
- René Bidal in 2019

Prefect of Maine-et-Loire
- Incumbent
- Assumed office 7 June 2019
- Preceded by: Bernard Gonzalez

High Commissioner of the Republic in French Polynesia
- In office 6 May 2016 – 7 June 2019
- Preceded by: Lionel Beffre
- Succeeded by: Dominique Sorain

Prefect of Eure
- In office 31 July 2014 – 6 May 2016
- Preceded by: Dominique Sorain
- Succeeded by: Thierry Coudert

Prefect of Pyrénées-Orientales
- In office 27 October 2011 – 31 July 2014
- Preceded by: Jean-François Delage
- Succeeded by: Josiane Chevalier

Prefect of Hautes-Pyrénées
- In office 1 April 2010 – 27 October 2011
- Preceded by: Françoise Debaisieux
- Succeeded by: Jean-Régis Borius

Personal details
- Born: 18 January 1960 (age 66) Béziers, Hérault, France
- Education: École nationale supérieure de la Police; University of Lyon; University of Montpellier

René Bidal (born 28 January 1960 in Béziers, France) is a French senior civil servant. He served as High Commissioner of the Republic in French Polynesia and earlier was Prefect of the departments of Eure, Pyrénées-Orientales, and Hautes-Pyrénées. He had previously served in a variety of positions in Eure-et-Loir (1986–89), Landes (1992–93), Finistère (1993–96), Aveyron (1996–98), Guingamp (1998–2000), Charente-Maritime (2000–03), Hauts-de-Seine (2003–06), Béthune (2006–08), and Rhône (2008–10).

He was named to his post as Prefect of Maine-et-Loire on 7 June 2019, succeeding Bernard Gonzalez, who had been named Prefect of Alpes-Maritimes.

== Honours and decorations ==
=== National honours ===
Ribbon bar	Honour
	Knight of the National Order of the Legion of Honour
	Officer of the National Order of Merit

=== Ministerial honours ===
Ribbon bar	Honour
	Officer of the Order of Academic Palms
	Knight of the Order of Maritime Merit
	Knight of the Order of Agricultural Merit

=== Civilian medals ===
Ribbon bar	Honour
	Honour medal of the National Police
	Medal of youth and sports
