= René Petitbon =

French colonial administrator (1902–1965)

Governor of French Somaliland
- In office 1954–1957
- Preceded by: Georges Rey
- Succeeded by: André Latrille

Governor of French Polynesia
- In office 1950–1954
- Preceded by: Armand Anziani
- Succeeded by: Jean-François Toby

Prefect of Constantine
- In office 1945–1949
- Preceded by: André Lestrade-Carbonnel
- Succeeded by: Maurice Papon

Prefect of Aube
- In office 1944–1945
- Preceded by: Pierre Blanchet
- Succeeded by: Pierre-Henry Rix

Personal details
- Born: 18 August 1902; Pau, France
- Died: 1 February 1965 (aged 62); Paris, France

René Jean Albert Petitbon (18 August 1902 – 2 February 1965) was a French colonial administrator who served as Governor of French Polynesia and French Somaliland in the 1950s.

== Biography ==
Petitbon was born in Pau in 1902, the brother of writer and journalist Pierre-Henri. After earning a Bachelor of the Arts in 1923, he completed his military service between 1925 and 1926. He then taught in lycées in Saint-Étienne and Clermont-Ferrand until joining the Alsatian Bank Society in 1928. He became deputy director for the Haut-Rhin region in 1935 and then served as director general of the Banques Populaire of the North Paris region from 1937 until 1944.

A member of the resistance during the Nazi occupation, he was appointed prefect of Aube in 1944. The following year he relocated to Algeria to become prefect of Constantine, a role he held until 1949. He then became Inspector General of Administrative Affairs in French West Africa. He was appointed Governor of French Polynesia in 1950, remaining in post until 1954 when he was appointed Governor of French Somaliland. He served in French Somaliland until 1957, and later worked in Algeria again between 1961 and 1962.

He died in Paris in 1965 at the age of 62.
