= Adolphe Colrat =

French senior civil servant

Prefect of Alpes-Maritimes
- In office 20 June 2013 – 3 November 2016
- Preceded by: Christophe Mirmand
- Succeeded by: Georges-François Leclerc

Prefect of Manche
- In office 22 July 2011 – 20 June 2013
- Preceded by: Jean-Pierre Laflaquière
- Succeeded by: Danièle Polvé-Montmasson

Prefect of Meurthe-et-Moselle
- In office 23 December 2010 – 22 July 2011
- Preceded by: Dominique Bellion
- Succeeded by: Raphaël Bartolt

High Commissioner of the Republic in French Polynesia
- In office 13 June 2008 – 23 December 2010
- Preceded by: Anne Boquet
- Succeeded by: Richard Didier

Prefect of Ardennes
- In office 9 January 2004 – 28 August 2006
- Preceded by: Bernard Lemaire
- Succeeded by: Catherine Delmas-Comolli

Personal details
- Born: 25 April 1955 (age 71) Lyon, Rhône, France
- Education: Sciences Po; École Normale Supérieure; École nationale d'administration

Adolphe Colrat (born 15 April 1955 in Lyon, France) is a French senior civil servant who served as the French High Commissioner of the Republic in French Polynesia from 2008 to 2011. He succeeded Anne Boquet in the post.

== Early life ==
Colrat grew up in Lyon. He is a graduate of the École normale supérieure (rue d'Ulm), agrégé de lettres classiques, graduate of the Institut d'études politiques de Paris and of the National School of Public Administration (France) (ENA).

== Career ==
Colrat held the post of chief of staff for the French police commissioner in Réunion, a French overseas department in the Indian Ocean, from 1983 until 1985. He served as the prefecture secretary general in Réunion beginning in 1992.

Colrat served as the head of civil protection at the Prefecture of the French capital, Paris from April 2001 until February 2004. He served as the Prefect of the Ardennes department from 2004 until 2006.

Colrat later became temporary director of political, administrative and financial affairs at the French Ministry for Overseas Territories for two years from August 2006 until 2008.

== High Commissioner of the Republic in French Polynesia ==
Colrat was appointed High Commissioner of the Republic in French Polynesia by the Sarkozy government in June 2008. His predecessor, Anne Boquet, departed French Polynesia on 29 June 2008, after serving three years as the first female High Commissioner.

He arrived in French Polynesia with his wife on Saturday night of 5 July 2008 to assume his position as High Commissioner. Colrat was greeted at the Faa'a International Airport in Papeete by French Polynesian President Gaston Tong Sang, members of the Assembly of French Polynesia and other local Tahitian-based politicians. He was sworn in as High Commissioner of the Republic in French Polynesia on Monday 7 July 2008.

== Honours and decorations ==
=== National honours ===
Ribbon bar	Honour
	Officer of the National Order of the Legion of Honour
	Commandeur of the National Order of Merit
