= Operation Amherst =

1945 military operation

- Part of the Western Front of 1944–45 in the European theatre of World War II
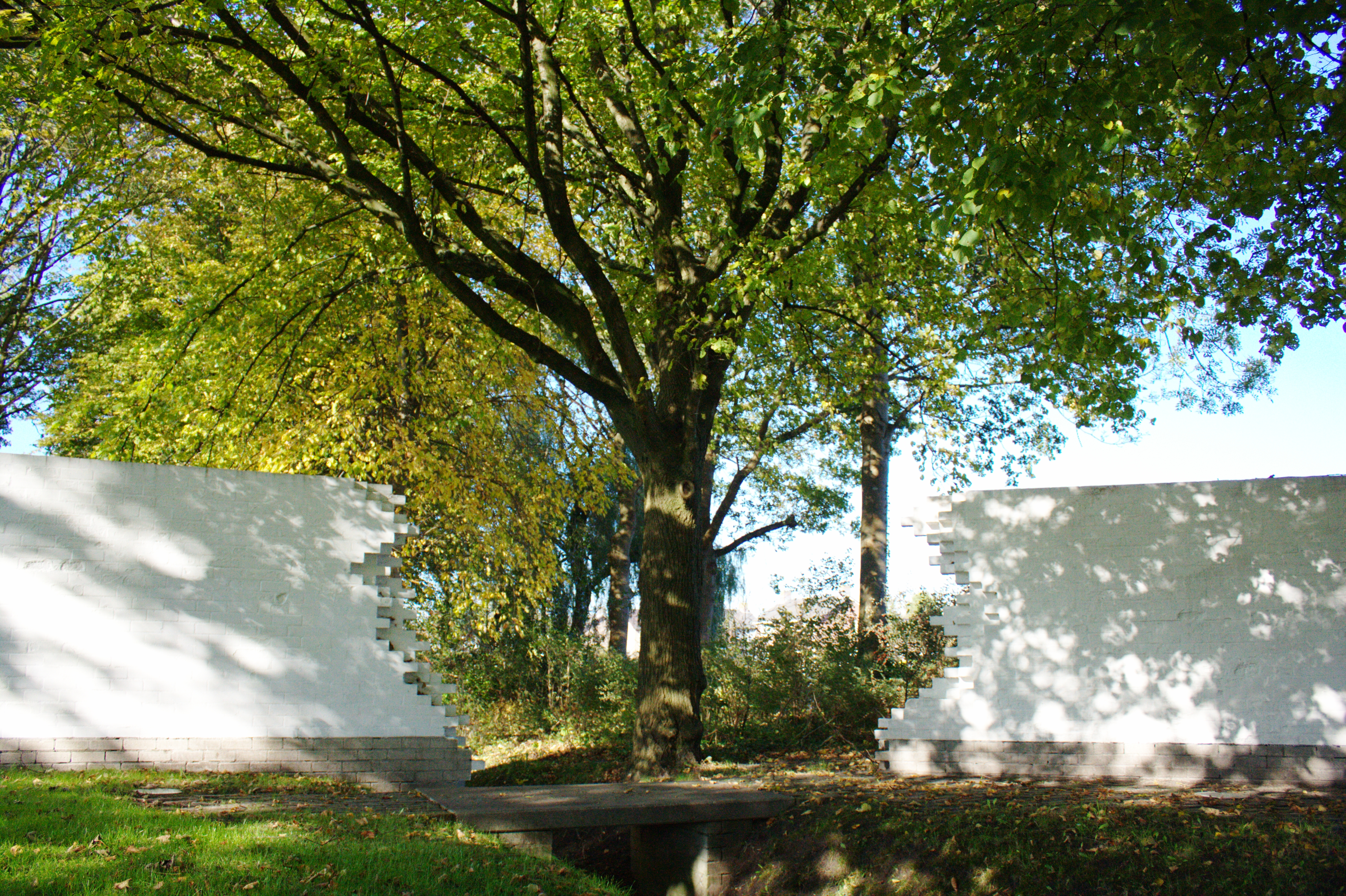
- Monument in Assen, the Netherlands
Date	7–8 April 1945
Location	Drenthe, Netherlands
Result	Allied victory

Belligerents
France; United Kingdom; Netherlands; Canada	Germany

Commanders and leaders
Mike Calvert; Pierre Sicaud	

Strength
Special Air Service: 3 SAS (French); 4 SAS (French); 8th Reconnaissance Regiment	Elements of the 25th Army

Casualties and losses
34 killed 60 wounded 69 captured	300 killed or wounded 187 captured

Operation Amherst was a Free French and British attack designed to capture intact Dutch canals, bridges and airfields during World War II. It was led by Brigadier Mike Calvert of Chindit fame.

== The battle ==
The operation began with the drop of 700 French Special Air Service troopers of the 3rd and 4th SAS (French) on the night of 7 April 1945. The teams spread out to capture and defend key facilities from the Germans. Advancing Canadian troops of the 8th Reconnaissance Regiment relieved the isolated French SAS.

The majority of the French paratroopers were dropped over the north-western part of the province of Drenthe. Here they occupied a series of bridges and conducted hit and run attacks on the withdrawing German troops. A small group of paratroopers under the command of Captain Pierre Sicaud were dropped in south-east Friesland close to the border of Drenthe. Under the cover of heavy clouds, several sticks consisting of approximately 15 paratroopers each managed to land without being detected by the Germans. Captain Sicaud, however, landed in a pine tree and his eye was pierced by a branch, seriously limiting the use of his eye.

Some of the French paratroopers were discovered by a band of Dutch resistance fighters who had made their shelter in the vast forests south of the small village of Appelscha. Led by an agent of the Dutch government in exile in England, the paratroopers re-grouped and conducted a series of attacks on German troops retreating through the area to Germany.

Sicaud and his paratroopers occupied an important bridge, seriously frustrating German troop movements. A series of running battles between the French, the Germans, and Dutch Nazi collaborators were conducted near the bridge. The civilian population of Appelscha, after a relatively calm five years of German occupation, experienced five days of heavy fighting that left no civilian casualties but plenty of German dead.

One group of paratroopers was dropped too far from Captain Sicaud and ended up on the outskirts of the small village of Haulerwijk, ten kilometers north of Appelscha. German troops discovered the French in the early morning of 8 April and a firefight broke out between the French and the Germans. One French SAS trooper was killed, while some of the French were captured and some managed to flee and catch up with the French fighting in and around Appelscha.

Eventually, in disarray, the Germans managed to counterattack with the rest of their troop. Some SAS and civilians were killed, but the remaining SAS troops forced the Germans to withdraw. This mini battle was referred to as "the last Amherst" where part of the town was destroyed, and a huge conflict ensued.
