= Journal officiel de la République française =

French government gazette

Official Journal of the French Republic
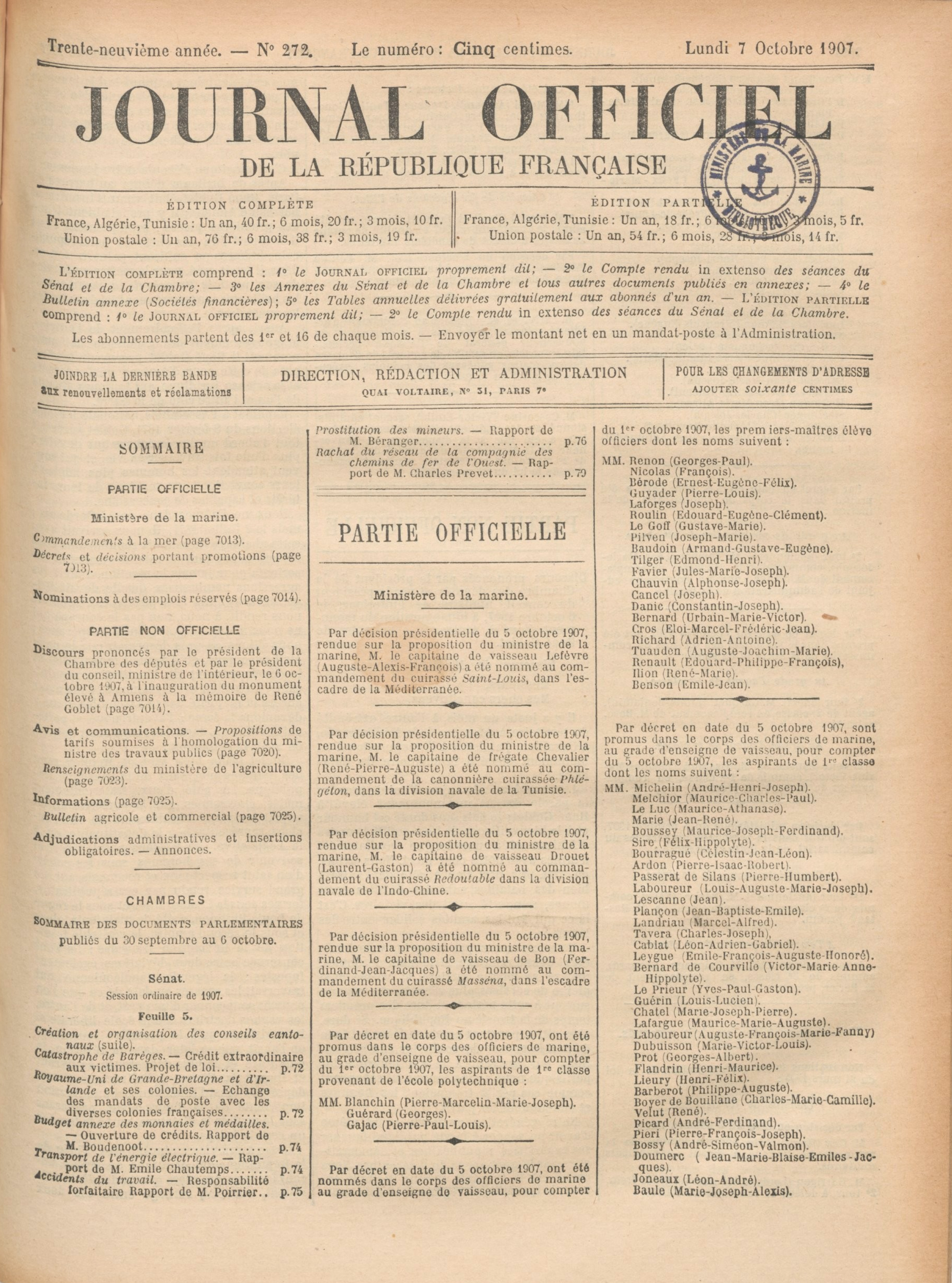
- Edition of 7 October 1907
- Type: Daily official journal
- Owner: Government of the French Republic
- Founder: Government of the French Empire
- Editor: Direction de l'information légale et administrative
- Founded: 1 January 1869; 157 years ago
- Language: French
- Headquarters: Paris
- ISSN: 0373-0425
- Website: legifrance.gouv.fr

The Official Journal of the French Republic (French: Journal officiel de la République française), also known as the JORF or JO, is the government gazette of the French Republic. It publishes the major legal official information from the national Government of France, the French Parliament and the French Constitutional Council.

== Publications ==
The journal consists of several publications:

- The best known is the "Laws and Decrees" (Journal officiel lois et décrets). It publishes all statutes and decrees, as well as some other administrative decisions. Statutes and decrees must be published in the Journal officiel before being binding on the French public
- The parliamentary debates (Senate, National Assembly, Economic, Social and Environmental Council)
- The Journal officiel Associations publishes notices of creations, breakup or substantial changes in nonprofit associations (according to the 1901 French law on associations)

== Service ==
The direction of Official Gazettes (French: Direction des journaux officiels) is a service of the Prime Minister of France. It publishes the Journal officiel as well as other official gazettes publishing information from certain ministries or administrations. It is based at 26, rue Desaix (15th arrondissement of Paris).

== Archives ==
=== Laws & Decrees ===
Period	Government	Archives
For laws from 1789 to 1869, see Bulletin des lois
1869 – 1870	Second Empire (Unique edition)	
1870 – 1880	Third Republic (Unique edition)	
1881 – 1954	Third Republic, Vichy, Provisional Government, Fourth Republic	
1955 – Present	Fourth Republic, Fifth Republic	

=== Parliamentary Debates ===
Period	Government	Chamber	Archives
For debates from 1789 to 1869, see Le Moniteur Universel
1869 – 1880	Included at the end of the Laws & Decrees edition		
1881 – 1940	Third Republic	Chamber of Deputies	
1881 – 1940	Third Republic	Senate	
1940 – 1944	Suspension of the parliament		
1944 – 1945	Provisional Government	Provisional Assembly	
1946 – 1958	Fourth Republic	National Assembly	
1946 – 1958	Fourth Republic	Council of the Republic	
1959 – Present	Fifth Republic	National Assembly	
1959 – Present	Fifth Republic	Senate	

=== Other editions ===
Period	Authority	Archives
1871	Paris Commune	
1940 – 1944	Free France	
1947 – 1993	Economic, Social and Environmental Council	

== See also ==
- Government of France
- Documentation française
- Légifrance
- Hansard
