= Christian Galliard de Lavernée =

French civil servant

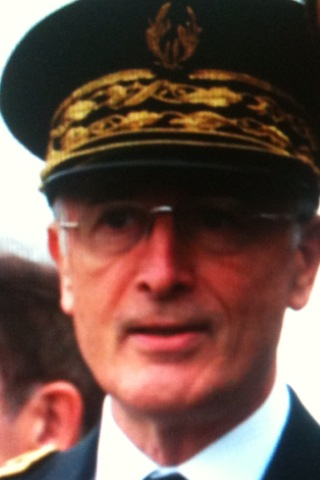
- Born: 2 May 1950; Lyon, Rhône, Rhône-Alpes, France
- Occupation: French prefect

Christian Galliard de Lavernée (born 2 May 1950) is a French civil servant.

== Career ==
- 1973 : Sciences Po Lyon
- 1975 : École nationale d'administration (ENA), promotion André Malraux.
- 1979 : Sub-prefect of Pithiviers, in Pithiviers City.
- 1995 : Prefect of Ariège, in Foix.
- 2006 : Prefect of Yvelines, in Versailles.
- 2008 : Prefect of Burgundy, prefect of Côte-d'Or, in Dijon.
- 2010 : Prefet of Lorraine, prefect of the zone de défense et de sécurité Est, prefect of Moselle, in Metz.
- 2012 : Prefect of Pays de la Loire, prefect of Loire-Atlantique, in Nantes.

Political offices
Preceded by Jean-François Gueullette	Prefect of Ariège; 1995–1997	Succeeded by Philippe Zeller
Preceded by Bernard Niquet	Prefect of Yvelines; 2006–	Succeeded by Anne Bouquet
Preceded by Dominique Bur	Prefect of Côte-d'Or; Prefect of Burgundy; 2008–	Succeeded by Anne Bouquet
Preceded by Bernard Niquet	Prefect of Moselle; Prefect of Lorraine; Prefect of the zone de défense et de sécurité Est; 2010–2012	Succeeded by Nacer Meddah
Preceded by Jean Daubigny	Prefect of Loire-Atlantique; Prefect of Pays de la Loire; 2012 2014–	Succeeded by still holding
