= Pierre-Henry Maccioni =

French civil servant (born 1948)

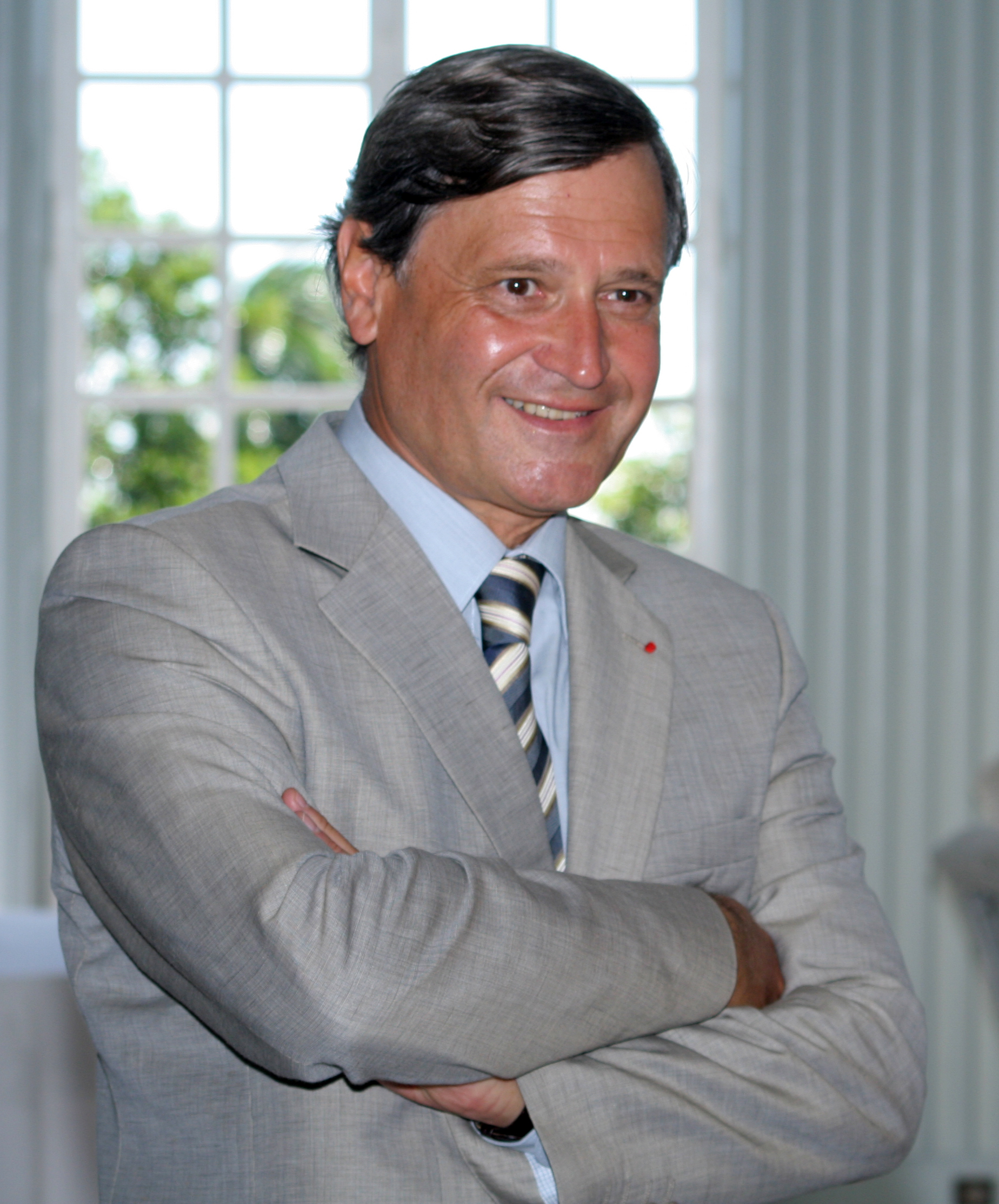
- Pierre-Henry Maccioni in 2008
- Born: 14 May 1948 (age 78); Saint-Denis, Réunion
- Occupation: French prefect

Pierre-Henry Maccioni (born 14 May 1948 in Saint-Denis, Réunion) is a French civil servant.

He is the son of Jean Maccioni, a sub-prefect; he was student of lycée Saint-Joseph de Tivoli in Bordeaux and was graduate of Institut d'études politiques de Bordeaux (IEP Bordeaux).

== Career ==
- 1970–1972: sub-prefect of Fontenay-le-Comte, Vendée, Pays de la Loire.
- 1 March 1982 – 1984: sub-prefect of Calvi, Haute-Corse, Corsica.
- 1984–1987: Secretary General of prefecture of Dordogne.
- 1988: Chef de cabinet (principal private secretary) to Roland Dumas (Foreign Minister).
- 9 March 1990 – 1993: sub-prefect of L'Haÿ-les-Roses, Val-de-Marne, Île-de-France.
- 1 October 1997 – 2001: prefect of Dordogne in Périgueux.
- 12 February 2001 – 2004: prefect of Saône-et-Loire in Mâcon.
- 7 January 2004 – 2006: prefect of Côtes-d'Armor in Saint-Brieuc.
- 19 July 2006 – 2010: prefect of Réunion: prefect of Réunion departement, prefect of Réunion region (same area) and prefect of zone de défense et de sécurité of South of Indian Ocean.
- 2010 : prefect of Val-d'Oise.
- On 16 January 2013: prefect of Upper Normandy region and prefect of Seine-Maritime in Rouen.

== Honours and awards ==
- France: Commandeur of Légion d'honneur (New Year 2013 promotion).

== See also ==
- List of colonial and departmental heads of Réunion
- List of colonial governors in 2006
- List of colonial governors in 2007

Political offices
Preceded by	Prefect of Dordogne; 1997–2001	Succeeded by
Preceded by	Prefect of Saône-et-Loire; 2001–2004	Succeeded by
Preceded by	Prefect of Côte-d'Armor; 2004–2006	Succeeded by
Preceded by Laurent Cayrel; Franck-Olivier Lachaud (acting Prefect)	Prefect of Réunion; 2006–2010	Succeeded by Michel Lalande
Preceded by Paul-Henri Trollé	Prefect of Val-d'Oise; 2010–2013	Succeeded by Jean-Luc Névache
Preceded by Pierre de Bousquet de Florian	Prefect of Seine-Maritime; Prefect of Upper Normandy; 2013–	Succeeded by Still holding
