= Dominique Sorain =

French senior civil servant

High Commissioner of the Republic in French Polynesia
- In office 10 July 2019 – 26 September 2022
- Preceded by: René Bidal
- Succeeded by: Éric Spitz

Prefect of Mayotte
- In office 28 March 2018 – 10 July 2019
- Preceded by: Frédéric Veau
- Succeeded by: Jean-François Colombet

Chef de Cabinet of the Minister of Overseas
- In office 24 May 2017 – 28 March 2018

Prefect of Réunion
- In office 2 August 2014 – 24 May 2017
- Preceded by: Jean-Luc Marx
- Succeeded by: Amaury de Saint-Quentin

Prefect of Eure
- In office 29 September 2011 – 2 August 2014
- Preceded by: Fabienne Buccio
- Succeeded by: René Bidal

Prefect of Vosges
- In office 5 January 2009 – 29 September 2011
- Preceded by: Albert Dupuy
- Succeeded by: Marcelle Pierrot

Personal details
- Born: 31 July 1955 (age 71) Caudéran, Gironde, France
- Education: Institut d'études politiques de Bordeaux

Dominique Sorain (born 31 July 1955 in Caudéran, France) is a French senior civil servant. He served as High Commissioner of the Republic in French Polynesia from 10 July 2019 until 2022.

== Honours and decorations ==
=== National honours ===
| Ribbon bar | Honour |
|---|---|
| | Knight of the National Order of the Legion of Honour |
| | Officer of the National Order of Merit |

=== Ministerial honours ===
| Ribbon bar | Honour |
|---|---|
| | Knight of the Order of Maritime Merit |
| | Commandeur of the Order of Agricultural Merit |

=== Civilian medals ===
| Ribbon bar | Honour |
|---|---|
| | National Defence Medal |
