= Étienne Richaud =

French colonial governor (1841–1889)

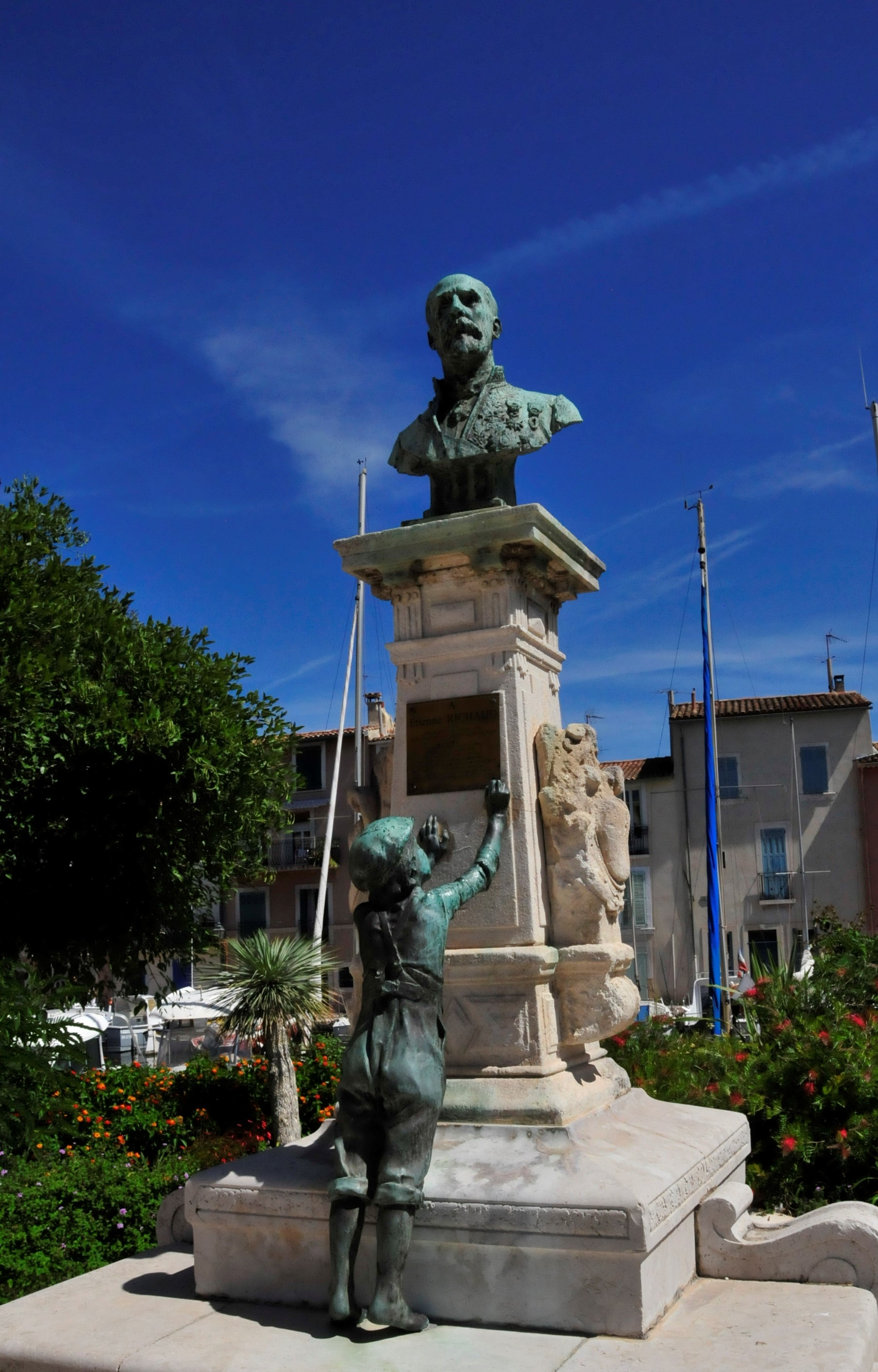
Monument to the memory of Étienne Richaud in Martigues (France)

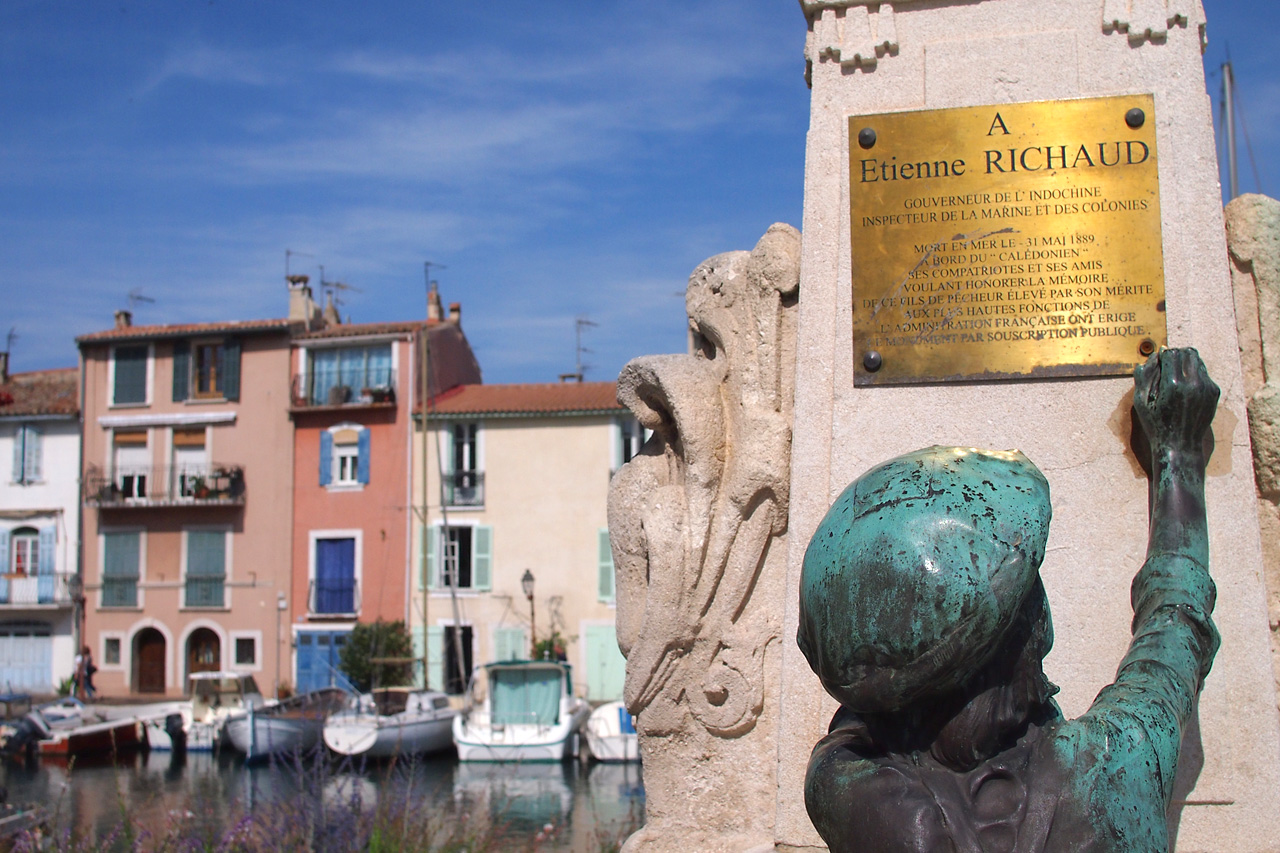
Monument to the memory of Étienne Richaud, detail

Étienne Antoine Guillaume Richaud (French pronunciation: [etjɛn ɑ̃twan ɡijom ʁiʃo]; 11 January 1841 in Martigues (Bouches-du-Rhône, France) – 31 May 1889 in the Bay of Bengal) was a French colonial administrator in the Second French Colonial Empire under Third Republic.

== Biography ==
He was born in Martigues in a family of fishermen. Suffering from a strong Myopia, he wasn't cut out to be a fisherman, but turned out to be a good student. He obtained his Baccalauréat in 1858, and three years later a law degree. He was then just twenty years old. He traveled throughout the French colonial empire and worked his way up in the administration.

In 1881, he returned to France and became Chef de Cabinet of the Minister of Commerce Maurice Rouvier (Gambetta's Ministry) for a year. After this, he returned to the colonies and became Governor General for French India (1884-86) and Governor of La Réunion (1886-87).

In 1888, Richaud reached the pinnacle of his colonial career by being appointed Governor General of French Indochina. Richaud was a reformist and tried to improve the often deplorable living conditions of the indigenous population. But his reform plans quickly earned him the wrath of his predecessor, Jean Antoine Ernest Constans, whose practices he had not hesitated to denounce. When Constans became Minister of the Interior in February 1889, he accused Richaud of taking bribes and summoned him back to Paris.
On the paquebot Calédonien, Richaud died suddenly, reportedly from a cholera attack and he was buried at sea only two hours after his death. His death was considered suspicious, as no other cases of cholera were reported on board and because of the haste with which his body was disposed of.

== Titles held ==
Government offices
Preceded by Théodore Drouhet	Governor-General of French India; October 1884–1886	Succeeded by Édouard Manès
Preceded by Ernest Constans	Governor General of French Indochina; 22 April 1888–30 May 1889	Succeeded by Jules Georges Piquet
