= Dominique Vian =

French official; prefect and overseas departments administrator

Dominique Vian (born 25 December 1944 in Valence, Drôme) is a French overseas departments administrator.

He is a graduate of Institut d’études politiques d'Aix-en-Provence ("Sciences Po Aix").

== Career ==
He was prefect of French Guiana from February 1997 to August 1999, prefect of Guadeloupe from August 2002 to July 2004, and prefect of Réunion from August 2004 to June 2005.

In 1999 : civil servant of United Nations in Kosovo.

He was commissaire adjoint de la République (name of sub-prefects in this time) of arrondissement of Cognac from 1984 to 1986, in Cognac City (Charente department).

He was prefect of Ardèche in Privas from 1999 to 2002. During his term of office, nature protection associations accused him of having protected poachers, contrary to the law, during the major annual massacres of migratory birds at the Col de l'Escrinet.

He was prefect of Alpes-Maritimes in Nice from August 2006 to October 2008.

Directeur de cabinet (principal private secretary) of François Baroin (Minister of Overseas) from 2005 to 2006.

Special counsellor of Gérard Larcher (President of the Senate of France) from 2008 to 2011.

Chargé de mission (project manager) of Marie-Luce Penchard (Minister in charge of Overseas) from 2011 to 2012.

== Honours and awards ==
- France:
  - Officer of Légion d’honneur
  - Officer of Ordre national du Mérite
  - Officer of Ordre du Mérite Maritime
  - Médaille d’honneur pour acte de courage et de dévouement (bronze medal)
- Brazil: Commander of the Order of the Southern Cross

== Sources ==
- (in French) "Vian, Dominique, Marie, André, Ferdinand" (prefect, born 1944), pages 2190–2191 in Who's Who in France : Dictionnaire biographique de personnalités françaises vivant en France et à l’étranger, et de personnalités étrangères résidant en France, 44th edition for 2013 edited in 2012, 2371 p., 31 cm, ISBN 978-2-85784-053-4 .

Dominique Vian French Prefect Born: 1944
Political offices
Preceded by Pierre Dartout	Prefect of French Guiana; 1997–1999	Succeeded by Henri Masse
Preceded by Raphaël Bartolt	Prefect of Ardèche; 1999–2002	Succeeded by Jean-François Kraft
Preceded by Jean-François Carenco	Prefect of Guadeloupe; 2002–2004	Succeeded by Paul Girot de Langlade
Preceded by Gonthier Friederici	Prefect of Réunion; 2004–2005	Succeeded by Laurent Cayrel
Preceded by Pierre Breuil	Prefect of Alpes-Maritimes; 2006–2008	Succeeded by Francis Lamy
