= Albert Dupuy =

French civil servant

Albert Dupuy (born February 1, 1947) is a French civil servant.

He was born in Alicante, Spain.

He was prefect of the French overseas territory of St. Pierre and Miquelon, from January 2005 to August 2006.

From December 2008 to July 2010, he was prefect of Isère.

Political offices
Preceded by Claude Valleix	Prefect of Saint Pierre and Miquelon; 2005–2006	Succeeded by Yves Fauqueur
Preceded by Michel Morin	Prefect of Isère; 2008–2010	Succeeded by Éric Le Douaron
Preceded by Yves Dassonville	High Commissioner of New Caledonia; 2010–2013	Succeeded by Jean-Jacques Brot
