= Pierre-André d'Héguerty =

French economist

Pierre-André d'Héguerty (1700–1763) was a French economist.

== Biography ==
With the support of André-Hercule de Fleury and Philibert Orry, Comptroller of Finances, he was appointed Attorney General to the Bourbon High Council and Police Judge in the Sainte-Suzanne, Réunion district. It was in Sainte-Suzanne, Réunion that he married Marie Françoise de Verdière on September 15, 1738, with whom he had two children: Grâce Thérèse Rose, born December 25, 1740, and Pierre Charles, born May 2, 1742 (descendants).

Appointed the island's first councillor on March 26, 1741, he took advantage of his position to collect numerous documents on the interests of Maritime transport and the resources of Navigation. He also made his fortune clearing land and growing coffee. The town of Saint-André, Réunion bears his name.

Back in France, Pierre-André d'Héguerty, along with his brother Dominique O'Heguerty, took an active part in preparing the 1745 expedition to re-establish a Stuart king on the three thrones of England, Scotland and Ireland. But it was a fiasco, and he preferred to return to Lorraine, where he had lived for several years before setting sail for Bourbon Island.

He became a renowned financier, the Seigneur de Villey-le-Sec, and one of the founders of the Académie des Sciences et Belles Lettres under King Stanislas. He died on January 12, 1763 in Nancy, France and was buried on January 14, 1763 in Nancy, France Saint-Roch church.
