= Hesse, Moselle =

Hesse
- Commune
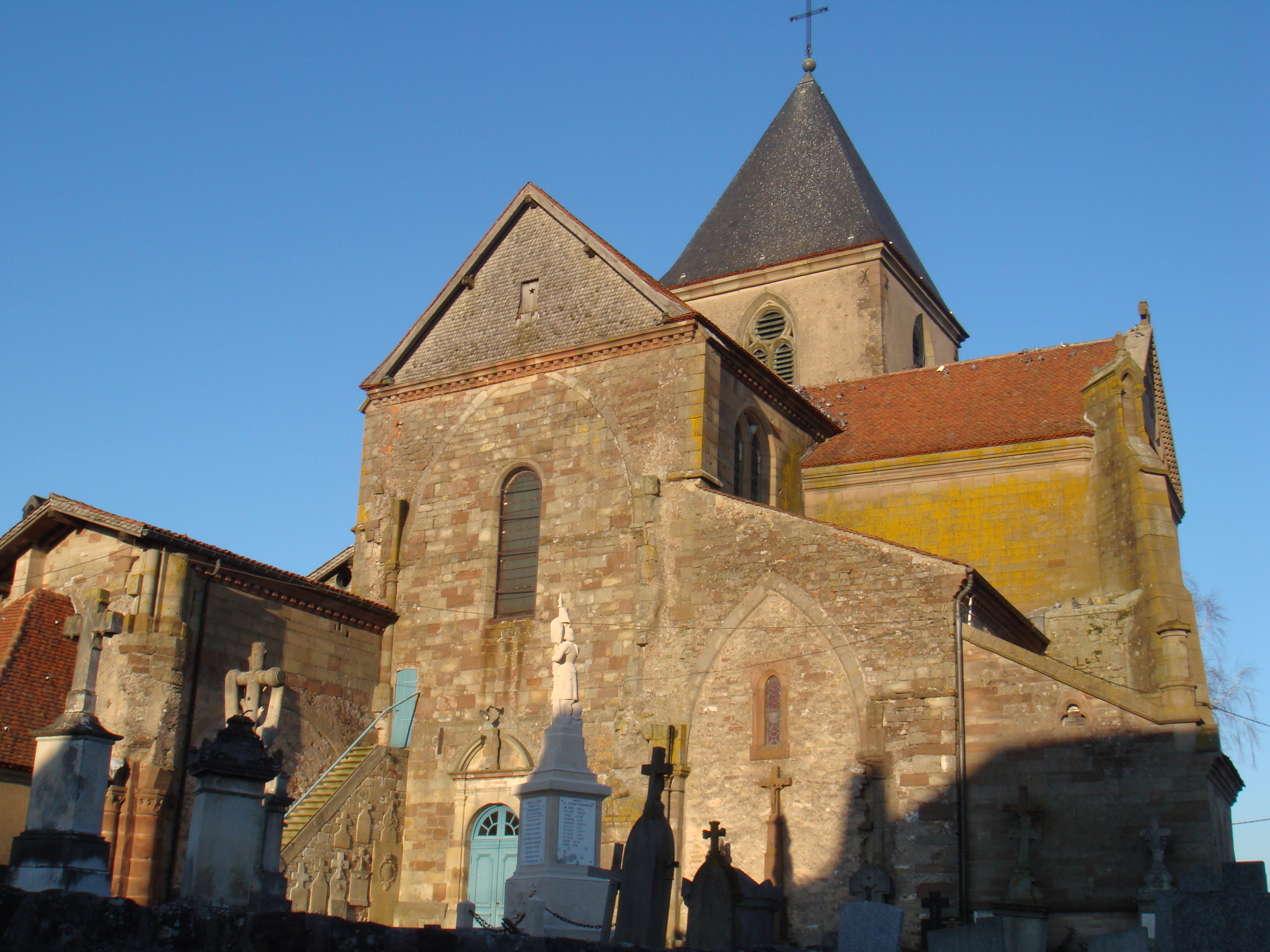
- The church in Hesse

- Coat of arms
- Location of Hesse
- Location within France Location within Grand Est
- Coordinates: 48°41′44″N 7°02′52″E
- Country: France
- Region: Grand Est
- Department: Moselle
- Arrondissement: Sarrebourg-Château-Salins
- Canton: Phalsbourg
- Intercommunality: CC Sarrebourg Moselle Sud

Government
  - Mayor (2023–2026): Hubert Helvig
- Area^{1}: 12.85 km^{2} (4.96 sq mi)
- Elevation: 330 m (1,080 ft)
- Highest elevation: 325 m (1,066 ft)
- Lowest elevation: 252 m (827 ft)
- Population (2023): 549
  - Density: 42.7/km^{2} (111/sq mi)
- Time zone: UTC+01:00 (CET)
  - Summer (DST): UTC+02:00 (CEST)
- INSEE/Postal code: 57321 /57400
- ^{1} French Land Register data, which excludes lakes, ponds, glaciers > 1 km^{2} (0.386 sq mi or 247 acres) and river estuaries.

Hesse (French pronunciation: [ɛs]; German: Hessen) is a commune in the Moselle department in Grand Est in north-eastern France.

== See also ==
- Communes of the Moselle department
