= Légifrance =

Website for French legal information

- Website type: Public service and legal information portal
- Available in: French
- Owner: French government
- Website: www.legifrance.gouv.fr
- Commercial: No
- Current status: Active

Légifrance (French pronunciation: [leʒifʁɑ̃s]) is the official website of the French government for the publication of legislation, regulations, and legal information. It was established by decree in 2002. Access to the site is free.

Virtually complete, it presents or refers to all concerned institutions or administrations, all texts still in force since 1539 and all the upper courts jurisprudence since 1986 as well as the most pertinent one of all courts since 1875.

== See also ==
- Journal Officiel de la République Française
