= Port-aux-Français =

Port-aux-Français Port-aux-Français Port of France Port to the French
- Scientific Research Base
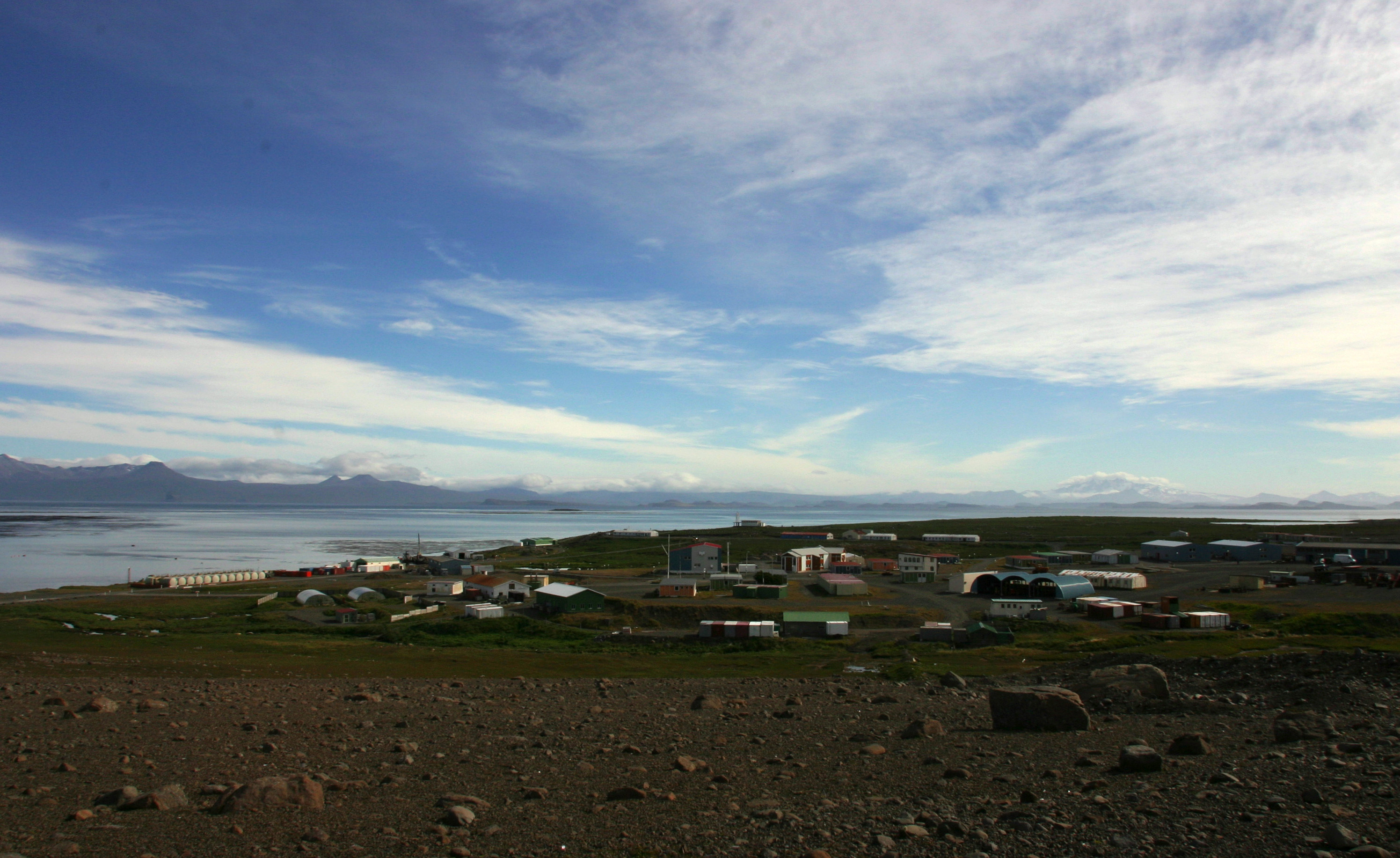
- Port-aux-Français in 2005

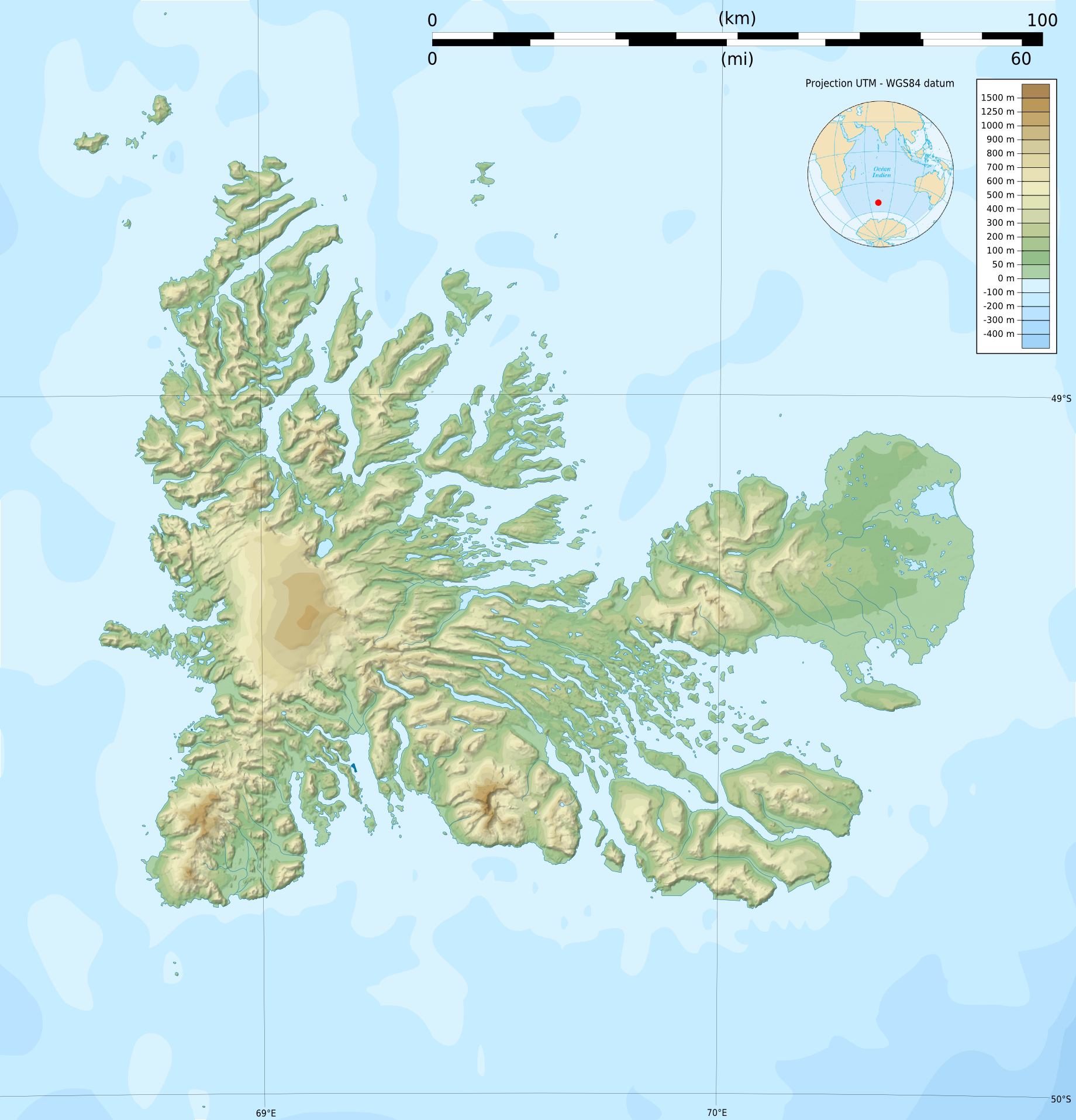
- Location in Kerguelen Islands & Indian Ocean Port-aux-Français (Indian Ocean)
- Coordinates: 49°21′00″S 70°13′08″E
- Country: France
- Territory: TAAF
- District: Kerguelen Islands
- Established: 1963

Area
  - Total: 0.70 km^{2} (0.27 sq mi)
  - Land: 0.70 km^{2} (0.27 sq mi)
- Elevation: 10 m (33 ft)

Population
  - Summer: 120
  - Winter: 45
- Time zone: UTC+5
- UN/LOCODE: TF PFR
- Active times: All year-round
- Status: Operational
- Activities: List: Meteorology; Geophysics; Biology
- Website: https://taaf.fr

Port-aux-Français (French pronunciation: [pɔʁ o fʁɑ̃sɛ]) is the main settlement of the Kerguelen Islands, and of the French Southern and Antarctic Lands, in the south Indian Ocean.

== Occupancy ==
The settlement is located on the shore of the Gulf of Morbihan. About 45 residents spend winter there, although the group can reach over 120 people in the summer. The location was chosen in 1949 by Pierre Sicaud as a sheltered site suitable for the construction of an airfield, though this was never built.

From 1955 to 1957, a French slaughterhouse company, SIDAP, built an elephant seal processing plant equipped with Australian machinery. The factory opened its doors just after the wedding of the director, Marc Péchenart, and Martine Raulin on 16 December 1957. This was the first marriage ever celebrated on the islands. The factory closed in 1960, and the equipment was sent to Réunion in 2005.

Port-aux-Français has a shallow seaport which allows the unloading of supply ships (usually the Marion Dufresne) with barges shuttling to the quay.

The settlement, in addition to the logistical facilities for its own operation, hosts scientific laboratories (biology, geophysics), technical stations (such as meteorology, telecommunications and satellite tracking), a cinema and a small medical centre. There is also a small Catholic Church – Notre-Dame des Vents – in the settlement.

== Tidal gauges ==
The base of Port-aux-Français is equipped with a marigraphic station, having three measuring devices:

- two tide gauges to measure pressure at sea bottom
- a radar measuring the sea level.

The two marigraphs and the radar send data to a local server, which relays them hourly to the Internet via the Argos satellite system.

== Climate ==
Port-aux-Français has an ocean-moderated mild tundra climate (Köppen climate classification ET). Temperatures (without windchill) tend to remain fairly stable throughout the year, rarely reaching over 18 °C (64 °F) or falling below −8 °C (18 °F). The average temperature in February, the warmest month, is 7.5 °C (45.5 °F) with a maximum of 11.5 °C (52.7 °F) during the day and 4.3 °C (39.7 °F) during the night. In winter, July and August are the coldest months, averaging 4.8 to 5.0 °C (40.6 to 41.0 °F) during the day and −0.8 °C (30.6 °F) at night.

Snowfall is possible in all months, though more common in winter. The climate is windier than in most places, with a recorded gust of 80 m/s (290 km/h; 180 mph). The lowest recorded temperature was −9.5 °C (14.9 °F) on 11 August 2014, which beats the old record of −9.4 °C (15.1 °F) set in June 1953. The highest temperature was 23.0 °C (73.4 °F) on 30 January 1959.

Climate data for Port-aux-Français, Kerguelen Islands (1991–2020 averages, extremes 1950–present)
Month	Jan	Feb	Mar	Apr	May	Jun	Jul	Aug	Sep	Oct	Nov	Dec	Year
Record high °C (°F)	25.8 (78.4)	23.6 (74.5)	22.3 (72.1)	23.1 (73.6)	16.8 (62.2)	14.5 (58.1)	13.2 (55.8)	15.0 (59.0)	15.8 (60.4)	19.1 (66.4)	19.9 (67.8)	22.1 (71.8)	25.8 (78.4)
Mean daily maximum °C (°F)	12.2 (54.0)	12.3 (54.1)	11.5 (52.7)	9.7 (49.5)	6.9 (44.4)	5.6 (42.1)	5.0 (41.0)	5.2 (41.4)	5.9 (42.6)	7.4 (45.3)	9.0 (48.2)	10.9 (51.6)	8.5 (47.3)
Daily mean °C (°F)	8.4 (47.1)	8.6 (47.5)	7.9 (46.2)	6.3 (43.3)	4.0 (39.2)	2.8 (37.0)	2.2 (36.0)	2.4 (36.3)	2.9 (37.2)	4.1 (39.4)	5.4 (41.7)	7.2 (45.0)	5.2 (41.4)
Mean daily minimum °C (°F)	4.7 (40.5)	4.9 (40.8)	4.2 (39.6)	3.0 (37.4)	1.2 (34.2)	0.1 (32.2)	−0.5 (31.1)	−0.4 (31.3)	−0.2 (31.6)	0.7 (33.3)	1.9 (35.4)	3.6 (38.5)	1.9 (35.4)
Record low °C (°F)	−1.5 (29.3)	−1.0 (30.2)	−2.2 (28.0)	−4.4 (24.1)	−7.2 (19.0)	−8.5 (16.7)	−8.9 (16.0)	−9.5 (14.9)	−7.6 (18.3)	−5.1 (22.8)	−4.4 (24.1)	−3.3 (26.1)	−9.5 (14.9)
Average precipitation mm (inches)	52.2 (2.06)	44.4 (1.75)	59.0 (2.32)	64.2 (2.53)	70.4 (2.77)	69.1 (2.72)	69.4 (2.73)	60.7 (2.39)	56.3 (2.22)	46.1 (1.81)	50.7 (2.00)	51.8 (2.04)	694.3 (27.33)
Average precipitation days (≥ 1.0 mm)	7.7	7.1	9.0	9.5	11.8	10.5	11.9	9.5	8.9	7.9	8.2	8.9	111.0
Average snowy days	1	0	2	4	6	10	11	13	12	11	7	2	79
Average relative humidity (%)	71	73	74	76	78	80	79	80	77	74	75	70	76
Average dew point °C (°F)	3 (37)	3 (37)	3 (37)	2 (36)	0 (32)	−1 (30)	−1 (30)	−1 (30)	−1 (30)	−1 (30)	1 (34)	2 (36)	1 (33)
Mean monthly sunshine hours	187.2	158.4	145.6	114.5	95.3	74.7	85.8	106.5	128.2	153.4	166.6	182.3	1,598.3
Source 1: Météo France
Source 2: Weatherbase (snow days), Time and Date (dewpoints 2005–2015)

== See also ==
- List of Antarctic research stations
- List of Antarctic field camps
- Port-Christmas
