= Jean Daubigny =

French civil servant (1948–2024)

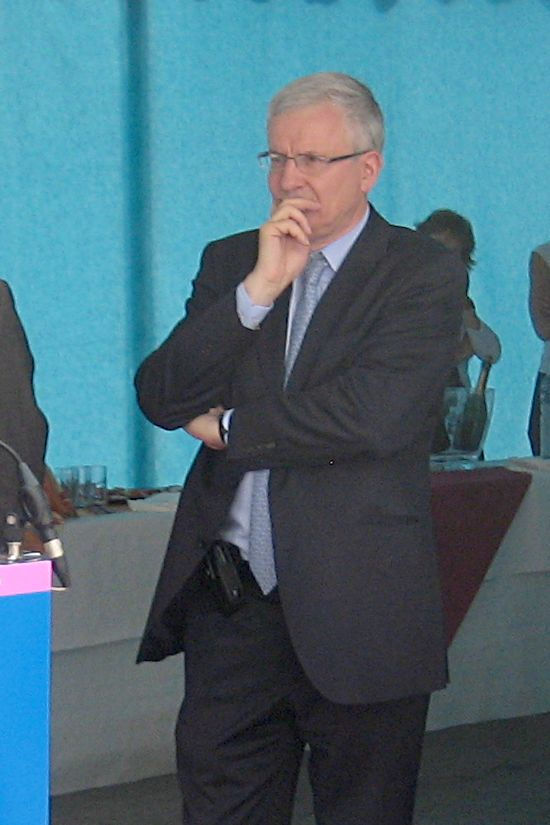
- Daubigny in 2009

Prefect of Paris
- In office 19 December 2012 – 3 January 2015
- Preceded by: Daniel Canepa
- Succeeded by: Jean-François Carenco

Prefect of Loire-Atlantique
- In office 3 July 2009 – 17 May 2012
- Preceded by: Bernard Hagelsteen
- Succeeded by: Christian Galliard de Lavernée

Prefect of Ille-et-Vilaine
- In office 20 July 2006 – 3 July 2009
- Preceded by: Bernadette Malgorn
- Succeeded by: Michel Cadot

Prefect of Haute-Garonne
- In office 1 September 2003 – 20 July 2006
- Preceded by: Hubert Fournier
- Succeeded by: André Viau

Prefect of Marne
- In office 6 June 2001 – 1 September 2003
- Preceded by: Michel Thénault
- Succeeded by: Dominique Dubois

Prefect of Réunion
- In office 15 July 1998 – 2 July 2001
- Preceded by: Robert Pommies
- Succeeded by: Gonthier Friederici

Prefect of Loire
- In office 4 June 1993 – 9 December 1996
- Preceded by: Patrice Magnier
- Succeeded by: Jean-Yves Audouin

Prefect of Vaucluse
- In office 4 January 1991 – 4 June 1993
- Preceded by: François Leblond
- Succeeded by: Joël Lebeschu

Personal details
- Born: 18 May 1948 Troyes, France
- Died: 2 July 2024 (aged 76) Troyes, France
- Education: Sciences Po; École nationale d'administration
- Occupation: Civil servant

Jean Daubigny (18 May 1948 – 2 July 2024) was a French civil servant.

In his highest role, he served as Prefect of Paris.

== Biography ==
Born in Troyes on 18 May 1948, Daubigny was the son of a school principal. After he attended the Sciences Po and the École nationale d'administration, he entered the prefectural corps, his first post serving as Prefect of Vaucluse. He went on to serve as Prefect of Loire, Prefect of Réunion, Prefect of Marne, Prefect of Haute-Garonne, Prefect of Ille-et-Vilaine, Prefect of Loire-Atlantique, and Prefect of Paris. After serving as prefect of Loire-Atlantique, he was appointed director of Minister of the Interior Manuel Valls's cabinet. He then replaced Daniel Canepa as Prefect of Paris. He was then replaced by Jean-François Carenco on 1 April 2015. He was considered very affable and diplomatic, which caused his slow decision-making and brevity in Valls's cabinet.

== Controversies ==
In 1983, Daubigny, while serving as chief of staff to the Prefect of Police, ordered the destruction of the second series of samples from the Robert Boulin affair, which led to a complaint being filed against him for destruction of evidence. However, while the courts ruled that the evidence should not have been destroyed, there was no malicious intent found behind Daubigny's actions.

== Tax evasion case ==
On 16 November 2016, Daubigny was arrested in connection with a tax fraud case. He and his wife allegedly failed to file their income taxes with the authorities for several years, evading approximately €190,000, as well as allegedly failing to pay local housing and property taxes. In September 2017, he was tried for tax fraud from the years 2011 to 2014, with previous years having surpassed the statute of limitations. The charges potentially carried a one year suspended prison sentence and a €50,000 fine, though he claimed that a blockage prevented him from opening administrative mail; he had not declared his income in 2016 or 2017 and had not asserted his pension rights even though he no longer worked. On 3 November 2017, he was sentenced to an eight month suspended prison sentence. In 2019, he was barred from wearing the Legion of Honour for three years.

== Death ==
Daubigny died on 2 July 2024 in Troyes at the age of 76.

== Decorations ==
- Legion of Honour (Knight in 1992, Officer in 2001, Commander in 2008) (suspended for three years 2019–2022)
- Commander of the Ordre national du Mérite (2008)
- Officer of the Ordre des Palmes académiques
- Officer of the Order of Agricultural Merit
- Commander of the Ordre du Mérite Maritime (2014)
- Officer of the Ordre des Arts et des Lettres (2016)
- Gold Médaille d'honneur de l'administration pénitentiaire
- Bronze Médaille de la jeunesse, des sports et de l'engagement associatif
- Commander of the Order of Civil Merit
