= Yves Dassonville =

French civil servant and statistician (1948–2021)

High Commissioner of New Caledonia
- In office 25 October 2007 – 7 October 2010
- Preceded by: Jean-Bernard Bobin (acting)
- Succeeded by: Albert Dupuy

Personal details
- Born: 9 April 1948; Paris, France
- Died: 15 June 2021 (aged 73)

Yves Dassonville (9 April 1948 – 15 June 2021) was a French civil servant and statistician. He served as the High Commissioner of New Caledonia from 25 October 2007, succeeding Michel Mathieu, who resigned following a disagreement with then Minister of Overseas France Christian Estrosi over general strikes and social problems in the territory, until 2010.

Dassonville was awarded the French National Order of Merit.

Dassonville died on 15 June 2021 at the age of 73.
