= René Barthes =

French colonial administrator (1894–1965)

René Victor Marie Barthes
- Born: 8 October 1894; Carpentras, France
- Died: 22 March 1965 (aged 70); Versailles, France
- Occupation: Professor of Philosophy

René Victor Marie Barthes (1894–1965) was a colonial administrator, governor general of French West Africa.

== Biography ==
Born on 8 October 1894, in Carpentras, he was first professor of philosophy, then director of staff at the Ministry of the colonies in 1937.

From 7 August 1939 to 20 September 1939, he was governor of New Caledonia. He was appointed Governor General of French West Africa in May 1946.

His chief of staff was Alioune Diop, who founded the Pan-African magazine Présence Africaine. Barthès held his post until 27 January 1948, when he retired.

in the 1950s, along with Lucie Aubrac, he was a member of the governing body of the Human Rights League, which developed in the context of resistance to the Algerian war.

René Barthes died in 1965. His funeral was held in the Cathedral Saint-Louis of Versailles.

== Writings ==
- « L'exploitation du sous-sol africain devant l’Europe », La Nouvelle Revue française d'Outre-mer, XIV, no 3, Paris, mars 1953, p. 63-65.
