= Pierre Sicaud =

French colonial administrator & military officer (1911-1998)

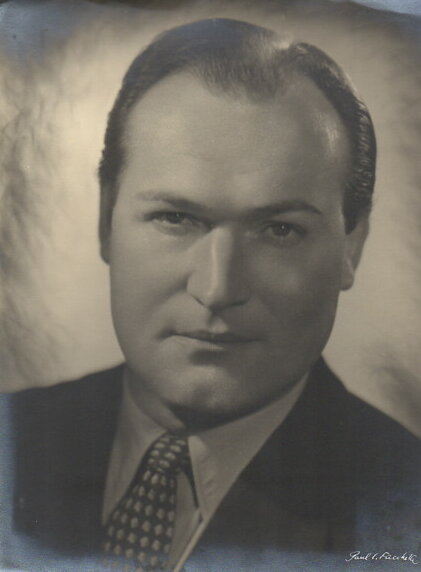
Pierre Sicaud

Pierre Sicaud (14 March 1911 – 15 January 1998) was a French colonial administrator.

During the Second World War, he joined the Free French Air Force as a parachutist and commanded a squadron of the SAS. He fought in Brittany and in the Netherlands during Operation Amherst.

In 1949 Sicaud was sent to the Kerguelen Islands in order to reinforce French sovereignty. He found a location for an airstrip and to settle a permanent station. He chose the name of Port-aux-Français and during the following years consolidated its foundation.

From 1955 to 1958 Sicaud was governor of Saint-Pierre-et-Miquelon and then from 1958 to 1961 of French Polynesia, during which he supervised the building of Tahiti's airport.

Sicaud died on 15 January 1998 at the age of 86. He is honoured on a postage stamp of the French Southern and Antarctic Lands issued in 1999.
