= Daniel Constantin (administrator) =

French colonial administrator (born 1940)

Daniel Auguste Constantin (born 8 September 1940 in Thonon-les-Bains), is a French colonial administrator.

He was the préfet of Réunion from 1989 until 1991 and the high commissioner of New Caledonia from 31 July 2002 until September 2005.
