= List of governors of dependent territories in the 21st century =

This is a list of territorial governors in the 21st century (2001–present) AD, such as the administrators of colonies, protectorates, or other dependencies. Where applicable, native rulers are also listed.

For the purposes of this list, a current dependency is any entity listed on these lists of dependent territories and other entities. A dependent territory is normally a territory that does not possess full political independence or sovereignty as a sovereign state yet remains politically outside of the controlling state's integral area. This latter condition distinguishes a dependent territory from an autonomous region or administrative division, which forms an integral part of the 'parent' state. The administrators of uninhabited territories are excluded.

== Australia ==
Australia
- Monarchs
- Prime ministers

- Administrators of the Australian Indian Ocean Territories:

Note: administrates Christmas Island and Cocos (Keeling) Islands
- Bill Taylor, Administrator (1999–2003)
- Evan Williams, Administrator (2003–2005)
- Neil Lucas, Administrator (2006–2008)
- Brian Lacy, Administrator (2009–2012)
- Jon Stanhope, Administrator (2012–2014)
- Barry Haase, Administrator (2014–2017)
- Natasha Griggs, Administrator (2017–2022)
- Sarah Vandenbroek, Administrator (2022-present)

- Christmas Island, territory

- Presidents of the Christmas Island Shire Council

- Dave McLane, President (1999–2001)
- Andrew Smolders, President (2001–2003)
- Gordon Thomson, President (2003–2011)
- Foo Kee Heng, President (2011–present)

- Cocos (Keeling) Islands, territory

- Presidents of the Shire of Cocos

- Mohammad Said Chongkin, President (1999–2001)
- Ron Grant, President (2001–2007)
- Mohammad Said Chongkin, President (2007–2009)
- Shane Charlston, President (2009–2009)
- Balmut Pirus, President (2009–2011)
- Aindil Minkom, President (2011–2015)
- Balmut Pirus, President (2015–2017)
- Seri Wati Iku, President (2017–present)

- Lord Howe Island, self-governed area of New South Wales

- Chairmen of the Board

- Sonja Stewart, Chairman (2016–present)

- Norfolk Island, territory

- Administrators of Norfolk Island

- Tony Messner, Administrator (1997–2003)
- Michael Stephens, acting Administrator (2003)
- Grant Tambling, Administrator (2003–2007)
- Owen Walsh, Acting Administrator (2007–2008), Administrator (2008–2012)
- Neil Pope, Administrator (2012–2014)
- Gary Hardgrave, Administrator (2014–2017)
- Eric Hutchinson, Administrator (2017–present)

- General managers

- Lotta Jackson, General manager (2016–present)

- Heads of government

- Ronald Coane Nobbs, Chief Minister (2000–2001)
- Geoffrey Robert Gardner, Chief Minister (2001–2006)
- David Buffett, Chief Minister (2006–2007)
- Andre Nobbs, Chief Minister (2007–2010)
- David Buffett, Chief Minister (2010–2013)
- Lisle Snell, Chief Minister (2013–2015)
self-government abolished
- Robin Adams, Mayor (2016–2021)

- Torres Strait Islands, territory with a special status fitting the native land rights

- Chairpersons of the Regional Authority

- Joseph Elu, Chairperson (2012–present)

== China ==
People's Republic of China
- Party chairmen
- Presidents
- Premiers

- Hong Kong, special administrative region

- Chief executives

- Tung Chee-hwa, Chief executive (1997–2005)
- Donald Tsang, Chief executive (2005–2012)
- Leung Chun-ying, Chief executive (2012–2017)
- Carrie Lam, Chief executive (2017–2022)
- John Lee, Chief executive (2022–present)

- Macau, special administrative region

- Chief executives

- Edmund Ho Hau Wah, Chief executive (1999–2009)
- Fernando Chui, Chief executive (2009–2019)
- Ho Iat Seng, Chief executive (2019–2024)
- Sam Hou Fai, Chief executive (2024–present)

== Denmark ==
Denmark
- Monarchs
- Prime ministers

- Faroe Islands, autonomous territory

- High commissioners

- Vibeke Larsen, High commissioner (1995–2001)
- Birgit Kleis, High commissioner (2001–2005)
- Søren Christensen, High commissioner (2005–2008)
- Dan Michael Knudsen, High commissioner (2008–present)

- Prime ministers

- Anfinn Kallsberg, Prime minister (1998–2004)
- Jóannes Eidesgaard, Prime minister (2004–2008)
- Kaj Leo Johannesen, Prime minister (2008–2015)
- Aksel V. Johannesen, Prime minister (2015–present)

- Greenland, autonomous territory

- High commissioners

- Gunnar Martens, High commissioner (1995–2002)
- Peter Lauritzen, High commissioner (2002–2005)
- Søren Hald Møller, High commissioner (2005–2011)
- Mikaela Engell, High commissioner (2011–present)

- Prime ministers

- Jonathan Motzfeldt, Prime minister (1997–2002)
- Hans Enoksen, Prime minister (2002–2009)
- Kuupik Kleist, Prime minister (2009–2013)
- Aleqa Hammond, Prime minister (2013–2014)
- Kim Kielsen, Prime minister (2014–present)

== Finland ==
Finland
- Presidents
- Prime ministers

- Åland, autonomous region

- Governors

- Peter Lindbäck, Governor (1999–2009)
office abolished

- Premiers of Åland

- Roger Nordlund, Premier (1999–2007)
- Viveka Eriksson, Premier (2007–2011)
- Camilla Gunell, Premier (2011–2015)
- Katrin Sjögren, Premier (2015–present)

== France ==
French Fifth Republic
- Heads of state
- Prime ministers

Caribbean

- Saint Barthélemy, overseas collectivity

- Prefects: the prefect of Guadeloupe has been the representative of Saint Barthélemy since 2007

- Jean-Jacques Brot, Prefect of Guadeloupe (2006–2007)
- Yvon Alain, Acting Prefect of Guadeloupe (2007)
- Emmanuel Berthier, Prefect of Guadeloupe (2007–2008)
- Amaury de Saint Quentin, Prefect of Guadeloupe (2011–2013)
- Marcelle Pierrot, Prefect of Guadeloupe (2013–2014)
- Jacques Billant, Prefect of Guadeloupe (2014–present)

- Prefects-delegated of Saint Barthélemy and Saint Martin

- Phillipe Chopin, Prefect delegated (2011–2015)
- Anne Laubies, Prefect-delegated (2015–present)

- Presidents of the Territorial Council

- Bruno Magras, President (2007–present)

- Saint Martin, territorial collectivity

- Prefects: the prefect of Guadeloupe has been the representative of Saint Barthélemy since 2007

- Jean-Jacques Brot, Prefect of Guadeloupe (2006–2007)
- Yvon Alain, Acting Prefect of Guadeloupe (2007)
- Emmanuel Berthier, Prefect of Guadeloupe (2007–2008)
- Amaury de Saint Quentin, Prefect of Guadeloupe (2011–2013)
- Marcelle Pierrot, Prefect of Guadeloupe (2013–2014)
- Jacques Billant, Prefect of Guadeloupe (2014–present)

- Prefects-delegated of Saint Barthélemy and Saint Martin

- Phillipe Chopin, Prefect delegated (2011–2015)
- Anne Laubies, Prefect-delegated (2015–present)

- Presidents of the Territorial Council

- Alain Richardson, President (2012–2013)
- Aline Hanson, President (2013–2017)
- Daniel Gibbs, President (2017–present)

North America

- Saint Pierre and Miquelon, overseas collectivity

- Prefects

- Claude Valleix, Prefect (2002–2005)
- Albert Dupuy, Prefect (2005–2006)
- Yves Fauqueur, Prefect (2006–2008)
- unspecified, Prefect (2008–2011)
- Patrice Latron, Prefect (2011–2014)
- Jean-Christophe Bouvier, Prefect (2014–2016)
- Henri Jean, Prefect (2016–present)

- President of the General Council

- Marc Plantagenest, President (2000–2005)
- Paul Jaccachury, Interim President (2005–2006)
- Charles Dodeman, President (2006)
- Stéphane Artano, President (2006–present)

Oceania

- New Caledonia, special collectivity

- High commissioners

- Daniel Constantin, High commissioner (2002–2005)
- Louis Le Franc, Acting High commissioner (2005)
- Michel Mathieu, High commissioner (2005–2007)
- Jean-Bernard Bobin, Acting High commissioner (2007)
- Yves Dassonville, High commissioner (2007–2010)
- Thierry Suquet, Acting High commissioner (2010)
- Albert Dupuy, High commissioner (2010–2013)
- Thierry Suquet, Acting High commissioner (2013)
- Jean-Jacques Brot, High commissioner (2013–2014)
- Pascal Gauci, Acting High commissioner (2014)
- Vincent Bouvier, High commissioner (2014–2016)
- Laurent Cabrera, Acting High commissioner (2016)
- Thierry Suquet, Acting High commissioner (2016–present)

- Presidents of the Government

- Jean Lèques, President (1999–2001)
- Pierre Frogier, President (2001–2004)
- Marie-Noëlle Thémereau, President (2004–2007)
- Harold Martin, President (2007–2009)
- Philippe Gomès, President (2009–2011)
- Harold Martin, President (2011–2014)
- Cynthia Ligeard, President (2014–2015)
- Philippe Germain, President (2015–present)

- French Polynesia, overseas collectivity

- High commissioners

- Jean Aribaud, High commissioner (1997–2001)
- Christian Massinon, Acting High commissioner (2001)
- Michel Mathieu, High commissioner (2001–2005)
- Jacques Michaut, Acting High commissioner (2005)
- Anne Bouquet, High commissioner (2005–2008)
- Eric Spitz, Acting High commissioner (2008)
- Adolphe Colrat, High commissioner (2008–2011)
- Alexandre Rochatte, Acting High commissioner (2011–2011)
- Richard Didier, High commissioner (2011–2012)
- Jean-Pierre Laflaquière, High commissioner (2012–2013)
- Gilles Cantal, Acting High commissioner (2013)
- Lionel Beffre, High commissioner (2013–2016)
- Marc Tschiggfrey, Acting High commissioner (2016)
- René Bidal, High commissioner (2016–present)

- Presidents

- Gaston Flosse, President (1991–2004)
- Oscar Temaru, President (2004)
- Gaston Flosse, President (2004–2005)
- Oscar Temaru, President (2005–2006)
- Gaston Tong Sang, President (2006–2007)
- Oscar Temaru, President (2007–2008)
- Gaston Flosse, President (2008)
- Gaston Tong Sang, President (2008–2009)
- Oscar Temaru, President (2009)
- Gaston Tong Sang, President (2009–2011)
- Oscar Temaru, President (2011–2013)
- Gaston Flosse, President (2013–2014)
- Nuihau Laurey, Acting President (2014)
- Édouard Fritch, President (2014–present)

- Wallis and Futuna, overseas collectivity

- Administrators superior

- Alain Waquet, Administrator superior (2000–2002)
- Christian Job, Administrator superior (2002–2005)
- Xavier de Fürst, Administrator superior (2005–2006)
- Richard Didier, Administrator superior (2006–2008)
- Philippe Paolantoni, Administrator superior (2008–2010)
- Michel Jeanjean, Administrator superior (2010–2013)
- Michel Aubouin, Administrator superior (2013–2015)
- Marcel Renouf, Administrator superior (2015–present)

- Presidents of the Territorial assembly

- Soane Mani Uhila, President (1999–2001)
- Patalione Kanimoa, President (2001–2005)
- Apeleto Likuvalu, President (2005)
- Emeni Simete, President (2005–2007)
- Pesamino Taputai, President (2007)
- Victor Brial, President (2007–2010)
- Siliako Lauhea, President (2010–2011)
- Pesamino Taputai, President (2011–2012)
- Vetelino Nau, President (2012)
- Sosefo Suve, President (2012–2013)
- Nivaleta Iloai, President (2013)
- Petelo Hanisi, President (2013–2014)
- Mikaele Kulimoetoke, President (2014–present)

- Kings of Uvea (Wallis)

- Tomasi Kulimoetoke II, King (1959–2007)
- Council of Ministers (2007–2008)
- Kapiliele Faupala, King (2008–2014)
- Council of Ministers (2014–2016)
- Felice Tominiko Halagahu, co-claimant King (2016)
- Patalione Kanimoa, co-claimant King (2016–present)

- Kings of Alo

- Sagato Alofi, King (1997–2002)
- Soane Patita Maituku, King (2002–2008)
- Petelo Vikena, King (2008–2010)
- Petelo Sea, King (2014–2016)
- Filipo Katoa, King (2016–present)

- Kings of Sigave

- Pasilio Keletaona, King (1997–2003)
- Visesio Moeliku, King (2004–2009)
- Polikalepo Kolivai, King (2010–2014)
- Eufenio Takala, King (2016–present)

== Netherlands ==
Kingdom of the Netherlands
- Monarchs
- Prime ministers

- Netherlands Antilles, constituent country: 1954–2010

- Governors

- Frits Goedgedrag, Governor (2002–2010)

- Prime ministers

- Etienne Ys, Prime minister (2002–2003)
- Ben Komproe, Prime minister (2003)
- Mirna Louisa-Godett, Prime minister (2003–2004)
- Etienne Ys, Prime minister (2004–2006)
- Emily de Jongh-Elhage, Prime minister (2006–2010)
Dissolved into Aruba, Curaçao, Sint Maarten, and the Caribbean Netherlands, 2010

- Aruba, autonomous territory

- Governors

- Olindo Koolman, Governor (1992–2004)
- Fredis Refunjol, Governor (2004–2016)
- Alfonso Boekhoudt, Governor (2017–present)

- Prime ministers

- Henny Eman, Prime minister (1994–2001)
- Nelson Oduber, Prime minister (2001–2009)
- Mike Eman, Prime minister (2009–present)

- Curaçao, autonomous territory

- Governors

- Frits Goedgedrag, Governor (2010–2012)
- Adèle van der Pluijm-Vrede, Acting Governor (2012–2013)
- Lucille George-Wout, Governor (2013–present)

- Prime ministers

- Gerrit Schotte, Prime minister (2010–2012)
- Stanley Betrian, Prime minister (2012)
- Daniel Hodge, Prime minister (2012–2013)
- Ivar Asjes, Prime minister (2013–2015)
- Ben Whiteman, Prime minister (2015–2016)
- Hensley Koeiman, Prime minister (2016–present)

- Sint Maarten, autonomous territory

- Governors

- Eugene Holiday, Governor (2010–2022)
- Ajamu Baly, Governor (2022-present)

- Prime ministers

- Sarah Wescot-Williams, Prime minister (2010–2014)
- Marcel Gumbs, Prime minister (2014–2015)
- William Marlin, Prime minister (2015–2017)
- Rafael Boasman, Prime minister (2017-2018)
- Leona Marlin-Romeo, Prime minister (2018-2019)
- Wycliffe Smith, Prime minister (2019-2019)
- Silveria Jacobs, Prime minister (2019-2024)
- Luc Mercelina, Prime minister (2024-present)

== New Zealand ==
New Zealand
- Monarchs
- Prime ministers

- Cook Islands, state in free association

- High commissioners of the Cook Islands

- Nick Hurley, High commissioner (2015–2017)
- Peter Marshall, High commissioner (2017–present)

- Queen's Representatives

- Sir Apenera Short, Queen's representative (1990–2000)
- Laurence Murray Greig, Acting Queen's representative (2000–2001)
- Sir Frederick Tutu Goodwin, Queen's representative (2001–2013)
- Tom Marsters, Queen's representative (2013–present)

- Prime ministers

- Terepai Maoate, Prime minister (1999–2002)
- Robert Woonton, Prime minister (2002–2004)
- Jim Marurai, Prime minister (2004–2010)
- Henry Puna, Prime minister (2010–present)

- Niue, associated state

- High commissioners

- Sandra Lee-Vercoe, High commissioner (2003–2005)
- John Bryan, Acting High commissioner (?–2010)
- Mark Blumsky, High commissioner (2010–2014)
- Ross Ardern, High commissioner (2014–present)

- Premiers

- Sani Lakatani, Premier (1999–2002)
- Young Vivian, Premier (2002–2008)
- Toke Talagi, Premier (2008–present)

- Tokelau, territory

- Administrators

- Lindsay Johnstone Watt, Administrator (1993–2003)
- Neil Walter, Administrator (2003–2006)
- David Payton, Administrator (2006–2009)
- John Allen, Acting Administrator (2009–2010)
- Jonathan Kings, Administrator (2011–2015)
- Linda Te Puni, Acting Administrator (2015–2016)
- David Nicholson, Acting Administrator (2016–present)

- Heads of government

- Kolouei O'Brien, Head of government (2000–2001)
- Kuresa Nasau, Head of government (2001–2002)
- Pio Tuia, Head of government (2002–2003)
- Kolouei O'Brien, Head of government (2003–2004)
- Patuki Isaako, Head of government (2004–2005)
- Pio Tuia, Head of government (2005–2006)
- Kolouei O'Brien, Head of government (2006–2007)
- Kuresa Nasau, Head of government (2007–2008)
- Pio Tuia, Head of government (2008–2009)
- Foua Toloa, Head of government (2009–2010)
- Kuresa Nasau, Head of government (2010–2011)
- Foua Toloa, Head of government (2011–2012)
- Kerisiano Kalolo, Head of government (2012–2013)
- Salesio Lui, Head of government (2013–2014)
- Kuresa Nasau, Head of government (2014–2015)
- Siopili Perez, Head of government (2015–2016)
- Afega Gaualofa, Head of government (2016–present)

== Norway ==
Norway
- Monarchs
- Prime ministers

- Svalbard, territory

- Governors

- Morten Ruud, Governor (1998–2001)
- Odd Olsen Ingerø, Governor (2001–2005)
- Sven Ole Fagernæs, Acting Governor (2005–2005)
- Per Sefland, Governor (2005–2009)
- Odd Olsen Ingerø, Governor (2009–2015)
- Kjerstin Askholt, Governor (2015–2021)
- Lars Fause, Governor (2021-Present)

== Portugal ==
Portugal
Portuguese colonial empire
- Presidents
- Prime ministers

- Azores, autonomous region

- Ministers and Representatives of the Republic

- Alberto Sampaio da Nóvoa, Minister of the Republic (1997–2003)
- Álvaro Laborinho Lúcio, Minister of the Republic (2003–2006)
- José António Mesquita, Representative of the Republic (2006–2011)
- Pedro Catarino, Representative of the Republic (2011–present)

- Presidents of the Regional Government

- Carlos César, President (1996–2012)
- Vasco Cordeiro, President (2012–2020)
- José Manuel Bolieiro, President (2020–present)

- Madeira, autonomous region

- Ministers and Representatives of the Republic

- Antero Monteiro Diniz, Minister of the Republic (1997–2006) and Representative of the Republic (2006–2011)
- Irineu Barreto, Representative of the Republic (2011–present)

- Presidents of the Regional Government

- Alberto João Jardim, President (1978–2015)
- Miguel Albuquerque, President (2015–present)

== United Kingdom ==
United Kingdom
- Monarchs
- Prime ministers

=== British isles ===
- Guernsey, Crown dependency

- British monarchs are the Dukes of Normandy
- Lieutenant governors

- Sir John Foley, Lieutenant governor (2000–2005)
- Geoffrey Rowland, Acting Lieutenant governor (2005)
- Sir Fabian Malbon, Lieutenant governor (2005–2011)
- Sir Geoffrey Rowland, Acting Lieutenant governor (2011)
- Peter Walker, Lieutenant governor (2011–2015)
- Sir Richard Collas, Acting Lieutenant governor (2015–2016)
- Sir Ian Corder, Lieutenant governor (2016–2025)
- Sir Richard Cripwell, Lieutenant governor (2022–present)

- Bailiffs

- Sir de Vic Carey, Bailiff (1999–2005)
- Sir Geoffrey Rowland, Bailiff (2005–2012)
- Sir Richard Collas, Bailiff (2012–2020)
- Sir Richard McMahon, Bailiff (2020–present)

- Chief ministers / Presidents of the Policy and resources committee

- Laurie Morgan, Chief minister (2004–2007)
- Mike Torode, Chief minister (2007–2008)
- Lyndon Trott, Chief minister (2008–2012)
- Peter Harwood, Chief minister (2012–2014)
- Jonathan Le Tocq, Chief minister (2014–2016)
- Gavin St Pier, President (2016–present)

- Alderney, self-governing island of Guernsey

- Presidents of the states

- Jon Kay-Mouat, President of the states (1997–2002)
- Sir Norman Browse, President of the states (2002–2011)
- Stuart Trought, President of the states (2011–present)

- Sark, self-governing island of Guernsey

- Seigneurs

- Michael Beaumont, Seigneur (1974–2016)
- Christopher Beaumont, Seigneur (2016–present)

- Jersey, Crown dependency

- British monarchs are the Dukes of Normandy
- Lieutenant governors

- Sir Michael Wilkes, Lieutenant governor (1995–2000)
- Sir Philip Bailhache, Acting Lieutenant governor (2000–2001)
- Sir John Cheshire, Lieutenant governor (2001–2006)
- Sir Philip Bailhache, Acting Lieutenant governor (2006)
- Sir Andrew Ridgway, Lieutenant governor (2006–2011)
- Michael Birt, Acting Lieutenant governor (2011)
- Sir John McColl, Lieutenant governor (2011–2016)
- William Bailhache, Acting Lieutenant governor (2016–2017)
- Sir Stephen Dalton, Lieutenant governor (2017–present)

- Bailiffs

- Sir Philip Bailhache, Bailiff (1995–2009)
- Sir Michael Birt, Bailiff (2009–2015)
- William Bailhache, Bailiff (2015–present)

- Chief ministers

- Frank Walker, Chief minister (2005–2008)
- Ian Gorst, Chief minister (2011–present)

- Isle of Man, Crown dependency

- British monarchs are the Lords of Mann
- Lieutenant governors

- Ian Macfadyen, Lieutenant governor (2000–2005)
- Michael Kerruish, Acting Lieutenant governor (2005)
- Sir Paul Haddacks, Lieutenant governor (2005–2011)
- David Doyle, Acting Lieutenant governor (2011)
- Adam Wood, Lieutenant governor (2011–2016)
- David Doyle, Acting Lieutenant governor (2016)
- Sir Richard Gozney, Lieutenant governor (2016–present)

- Chief ministers

- Donald Gelling, Chief minister 1996–2001)
- Richard Corkill, Chief minister 2001–2004)
- Allan Bell, Caretaker Chief minister (2004)
- Donald Gelling, Chief minister (2004–2006)
- Tony Brown, Chief minister (2006–2011)
- Allan Bell, Chief minister (2011–2016)
- Howard Quayle, Chief minister (2016–present)

=== Caribbean ===
- Anguilla, overseas territory

- Governors

- Peter Johnstone, Governor (2000–2004)
- Mark Andrew Capes, Acting Governor (2004)
- Alan Huckle, Governor (2004–2006)
- Mark Andrew Capes, Acting Governor (2006)
- Andrew George, Governor (2006–2009)
- Stanley Reid, Acting Governor (2009)
- Alistair Harrison, Governor (2009–2013)
- Stanley Reid, Acting Governor (2013)
- Christina Scott, Governor (2013–present)

- Chief ministers

- Osbourne Fleming, Chief minister (2000–2010)
- Hubert Hughes, Chief minister (2010–2015)
- Victor Banks, Chief minister (2015–present)

- British Virgin Islands, overseas territory

- Governors

- Frank Savage, Governor (1998–2002)
- Elton Georges, Acting Governor (2002)
- Tom Macan, Governor (2002–2006)
- Dancia Penn, Acting Governor (2006)
- David Pearey, Governor (2006–2010)
- Vivian Inez Archibald, Acting Governor (2010)
- William Boyd McCleary, Governor (2010–2014)
- Vivian Inez Archibald, Acting Governor (2014)
- John Duncan, Governor (2014–present)

- Chief ministers, Premiers

- Ralph T. O'Neal, Chief minister (1995–2003)
- Orlando Smith, Chief minister (2003–2007)
- Ralph T. O'Neal, Premier (2007–2011)
- Orlando Smith, Premier (2011–2019)
- Andrew Fahie, Premier (2019-2022)
- Natalio Wheatley, Premier (2022-present)

- Cayman Islands, overseas territory

- Governors

- Peter Smith, Governor (1999–2002)
- James Ryan, Acting Governor (2002)
- Bruce Dinwiddy, Governor (2002–2005)
- George McCarthy, Acting Governor (2005)
- Stuart Jack, Governor (2005–2009)
- Donovan Ebanks, Acting Governor (2009)
- Duncan Taylor, Governor (2010–2013)
- Franz Manderson, Acting Governor (2013)
- Helen Kilpatrick, Governor (2013–present)

- Leaders of government business, Premiers

- Kurt Tibbetts, Leader of government business (2000–2001)
- McKeeva Bush, Leader of government business (2001–2005)
- Kurt Tibbetts, Leader of government business (2005–2009)
- McKeeva Bush, Leader of government business (2009), Premier (2009–2012)
- Julianna O'Connor-Connolly, Premier (2012–2013)
- Alden McLaughlin, Premier (2013–present)

- Montserrat, overseas territory

- Governors

- Tony Abbott, Governor (1997–2001)
- Howard A. Fergus, Acting Governor (2001)
- Tony Longrigg, Governor (2001–2004)
- Sir Howard A. Fergus, Acting Governor (2004)
- Deborah Barnes Jones, Governor (2004–2007)
- John Skerritt, Acting Governor (2007)
- Sir Howard A. Fergus, Acting Governor (2007)
- Peter Waterworth, Governor (2007–2011)
- Sarita Francis, Acting Governor (2011)
- Adrian Davis, Governor (2011–2015)
- Alric Taylor, Acting Governor (2015)
- Elizabeth Carriere, Governor (2015–2018)
- Lyndell Simpson, Acting Governor (2018)
- Andrew Pearce (2018–present)

- Chief ministers, Premiers

- David Brandt, Chief minister (1997–2001)
- John Osborne, Chief minister (2001–2006)
- Lowell Lewis, Chief minister (2006–2009)
- Reuben Meade, Chief minister (2009–2011), Premier (2011–2014)
- Donaldson Romeo, Premier (2014–2019)
- Easton Taylor-Farrell, Premier (2019–present)

- Turks and Caicos Islands, overseas territory

- Governors

- Mervyn Jones, Governor (2000–2002)
- Cynthia Astwood, Acting Governor (2002)
- Jim Poston, Governor (2002–2005)
- Mahala Wynns, Acting Governor (2005)
- Richard Tauwhare, Governor (2005–2008)
- Mahala Wynns, Acting Governor (200)
- Gordon Wetherell, Governor (2008–2011)
- Martin Stanley, Acting Governor (2011)
- Ric Todd, Governor (2011–2013)
- Anya Williams, Acting Governor (2013)
- Huw Shepheard, Acting Governor (2013)
- Peter Beckingham, Governor (2013–2016)
- Anya Williams, Acting Governor (2016)
- John Freeman, Governor (2016–present)

- Chief ministers, Premiers

- Derek Hugh Taylor, Chief minister (1995–2003)
- Michael Misick, Chief minister (2003–2006), Premier (2006–2009)
- Galmo Williams, Premiers (2009)
- Rufus Ewing, Premier (2012–2016)
- Sharlene Cartwright-Robinson, Premier (2016–present)

=== Mediterranean ===
- Akrotiri and Dhekelia, sovereign base areas

- Administrators

- Bill Rimmer, Administrator (2000–2003)
- Peter Pearson, Administrator (2003–2006)
- Richard Lacey, Administrator (2006–2008)
- James Gordon, Administrator (2008–2010)
- Graham E. Stacey, Administrator (2010–2013)
- Richard J. Cripwell, Administrator (2013–2015)
- Michael Wigston, Administrator (2015–present)

- Gibraltar, dependent territory since 1981, then overseas territory since 2002

- Governors

- Sir David Durie, Governor (2000–2003)
- David Blunt, Acting Governor (2003)
- Sir Francis Richards, Governor (2003–2006)
- Philip Barton, Acting Governor (2006)
- Sir Robert Fulton, Governor (2006–2009)
- Leslie Pallett, Acting Governor (2009)
- Sir Adrian Johns, Governor (2009–2013)
- Alison MacMillan, Acting Governor (2013)
- Sir James Dutton, Governor (2013–2015)
- Alison MacMillan, Acting Governor (2015–2016)
- Ed Davis, Governor (2016–present)

- Chief ministers

- Fabian Picardo, Chief minister (2011–present)

=== Atlantic ===
- Bermuda, overseas territory

- Governors

- Thorold Masefield, Governor (1997–2001)
- Tim Gurney, Acting Governor (2001–2002)
- Sir John Vereker, Governor (2002–2007)
- Mark Andrew Capes, Acting Governor (2007)
- Sir Richard Gozney, Governor (2007–2012)
- David Arkley, Acting Governor (2012)
- George Fergusson, Governor (2012–2016)
- Ginny Ferson, Acting Governor (2016)
- John Rankin, Governor (2016–present)

- Premiers

- Jennifer M. Smith, Premier (1998–2003)
- Alex Scott, Premier (2003–2006)
- Ewart Brown, Premier (2006–2010)
- Paula Cox, Premier (2010–2012)
- Craig Cannonier, Premier (2012–2014)
- Michael Dunkley, Premier (2014–present)

- Falkland Islands, overseas territory

- Governors

- Donald Lamont, Governor (1999–2002)
- Russ Jarvis, Acting Governor (2002)
- Howard Pearce, Governor (2002–2006)
- Harriet Hall, Acting Governor (2006)
- Alan Huckle, Governor (2006–2010)
- Ric Nye, Acting Governor (2010)
- Nigel Haywood, Governor (2010–2014)
- Sandra Tyler-Haywood, Acting Governor (2014)
- John Duncan, Acting Governor (2014)
- Colin Roberts, Governor (2014–2017)
- Nigel Phillips, Governor (2017–2022)
- Alison Blake, Governor (2022-present)

- Saint Helena, Ascension and Tristan da Cunha, overseas territory

- Governors

- David Hollamby, Governor (1999–2004)
- Michael Clancy, Governor (2004–2007)
- Andrew Gurr, Governor (2007–2011)
- Mark Andrew Capes, Governor (2011–2016)
- Sean Burns, Acting Governor (2016)
- Lisa Phillips, Governor (2016–2019)
- Philip Rushbrook, Governor (2019-2022)
- Nigel Phillips, Governor (2022–present)

- Ascension, dependency of Saint Helena

- Administrators

- Geoffrey Fairhurst, Administrator (1999–2002)
- Matt Young, Administrator (2002, 2002)
- Adam Henshaw, Administrator (2002)
- Andrew Kettlewell, Administrator (2002–2005)
- Michael Hill, Administrator (2005–2008)
- Ross Denny, Administrator (2008–2011)
- Miles Miller, Acting Administrator (2011, 2011)
- Joanne Yeadon, Acting Administrator (2011)
- Colin Wells, Administrator (2011–2014)
- Marc Holland, Administrator (2014–present)

- Tristan da Cunha, dependency of Saint Helena

- Administrators

- Bill Dickson, Administrator (c.2001–2004)
- Mike Hentley, Administrator (2004–2007)
- David Morley, Administrator (2007–2010)
- Sean Burns, Administrator (2010–2013)
- Alex Mitham, Administrator (2013–2016)
- Anne Biddle, Acting Administrator (2016)
- Sean Burns, Administrator (2016–present)

- Chief islanders

- Anne Green, Chief islander (2003–?)
- Conrad Glass, Chief islander (2007–2010)
- Ian Lavorello, Chief islander (2010–c.2012)

=== Indian Ocean ===
- British Indian Ocean Territory (Chagos Archipelago), overseas territory

- Commissioners

- John White, Commissioner (2001)
- Alan Huckle, Commissioner (2001–2004)
- Tony Crombie, Commissioner (2004–2006)
- Leigh Turner, Commissioner (2006–2008)
- Colin Roberts, Commissioner (2008–2012)
- Peter Hayes, Commissioner (2012–present)

- Administrators

- Charles A. Hamilton, Administrator (2002–2005)
- Tony Humphries, Administrator (2005–2007)
- Joanne Yeadon, Administrator (2007–2011)
- John McManus, Administrator (2011–2013)
- Tom Moody, Administrator (2013–2016)
- Nicola Carnie, Administrator (2016–present)

=== Oceania ===
- Pitcairn Islands, overseas territory

- Governors

- Martin Williams, Governor (1998–2001)
- Richard Fell, Governor (2001–2006)
- George Fergusson, Governor (2006–2010)
- Mike Cherrett, Acting Governor (2010)
- Victoria "Vicki" Treadell, Governor (2010–2014)
- Jonathan Sinclair, Governor (2014–present)

- Administrators

- Alan Richmond, Administrator (2014–present)

- Mayors

- Steve Christian, Mayor (1999–2004)
- Brenda Christian, Mayor (2004)
- Jay Warren, Mayor (2005–2007)
- Mike Warren, Mayor (2008–2013)
- Shawn Christian, Mayor (2014–present)

== United States ==
United States
- Presidents

=== Territories ===
- American Samoa, unincorporated territory
- Governors

- Tauese Sunia, Governor (1997–2003)
- Togiola Tulafono, Governor (2003–2013)
- Lolo Matalasi Moliga, Governor (2013–2021)
- Lemanu Peleti Mauga, Governor (2021–2025)
- Pula Nikolao Pula, Governor (2025–present)

- District of Columbia
- List of mayors of Washington, D.C.

- Anthony A. Williams, Mayor of the District of Columbia (2 Jan 1999 – 2 Jan 2007)
- Adrian M. Fenty, Mayor of the District of Columbia (2 Jan 2007 – 2 Jan 2011)
- Vincent C. Gray, Mayor of the District of Columbia (2 Jan 2011 – 2 Jan 2015)
- Muriel E. Bowser, Mayor of the District of Columbia (2 Jan 2015 – )

- Guam, unincorporated territory
- Governors

- Carl Gutierrez, Governor (1995–2003)
- Felix Perez Camacho, Governor (2003–2011)
- Eddie Baza Calvo, Governor (2011–2019)
- Lou Leon Guerrero, Governor (2019–present)

- Northern Mariana Islands, insular area
- Governors

- Pedro Tenorio, Governor (1998–2002)
- Juan Babauta, Governor (2002–2006)
- Benigno Fitial, Governor (2006–2013)
- Eloy Inos, Governor (2013–2015)
- Ralph Torres, Governor (2015–2023)
- Arnold Palacios, Governor (2023–present)

- Puerto Rico, unincorporated territory
- Governors

- Pedro Rosselló, Governor (1993–2001)
- Sila María Calderón, Governor (2001–2005)
- Aníbal Acevedo Vilá, Governor (2005–2009)
- Luis Fortuño, Governor (2009–2013)
- Alejandro García Padilla, Governor (2013–2017)
- Ricardo Rosselló, Governor (2017–2019)
- Wanda Vázquez Garced, Governor (2019–2021)
- Pedro Pierluisi, Governor (2021–2025)
- Jenniffer González-Colón, Governor (2025–present)

- United States Virgin Islands, unincorporated territory
- Governors

- Charles Wesley Turnbull, Governor (1999–2007)
- John de Jongh, Governor (2007–2015)
- Kenneth Mapp, Governor (2015–2019)
- Albert Bryan Jr., Governor (2019–present)

- Wake Island, unincorporated territory
- Island commanders

- unspecified commanders (1995-c.2005)
- Vinh Trinh, Commander (c.2005–2006)
- Nathan Harris, Commander (2006–2007)
- unspecified commanders (2007–2010)
- Aaron Wilt, Commander (2010–2011)
- Tammy Dotson, Commander (2011–2012)
- unspecified., Commander (2012–2013)
- Charlie J. Taylor, Commander (2013–2014)
- Jason Hardman, Commander (2014–2015)
- Ronald Dion, Commander (2015–2016)
- Allen Jaime, Commander (2016-2017/18)
- Marc P. Bleha(2017/18–present)

- Governors (also General Counsels of the U.S. Air Force)

- Jeh C. Johnson, Governor *"Oct 1998 – 31 Dec 2000)
- John P. Janecek, acting Governor (Feb 2001 – 8 Nov 2001)
- Mary L. Walker, Governor (8 Nov 2001 – 15 Jan 2009)
- Robert T. Maguire, acting Governor (15 Jan 2009 – Apr 2009)
- Michael W. Zehner, acting Governor (1 May 2009 – 1 Jun 2009)
- Charles A. Blanchard, Governor (1 Jun 2009 – Nov 2013)
- Joseph M. McDade, Jr., acting Governor (Nov 2013 – 16 Sep 2014)
- Gordon O. Tanner, Governor (16 Sep 2014 – 2 Jan 2017)
- Joseph M. McDade, Jr., acting Governor (2 Jan 2017 – 18 Feb 2018)
- Thomas "Tom" E. Ayres, Governor (18 Feb 2018–present)

=== Military occupations ===
- Afghanistan sovereign country, occupied by NATO (2002–2021)
- Commanders of the International Security Assistance Force (ISAF)

- John Chalmers McColl (U.K.), Commander of the International Security Assistance Force (10 Jan 2002 – 20 Jun 2002)
- Akin Zorlu (Turkey), Commander of the International Security Assistance Force (20 Jun 2002 – 10 Feb 2003)
- Norbert van Heyst (Germany), Commander of the International Security Assistance Force (10 Feb 2003 – 11 Aug 2003)
- Götz Gliemeroth (Germany), Commander of the International Security Assistance Force (11 Aug 2003 – 9 Feb 2004)
- Rick J. Hillier (Canada), Commander of the International Security Assistance Force (9 Feb 2004 – 9 Aug 2004)
- Jean-Louis Py (France), Commander of the International Security Assistance Force (9 Aug 2004 – 13 Feb 2005)
- Ethem Erdaği (Turkey), Commander of the International Security Assistance Force (13 Feb 2005 – 5 Aug 2005)
- Mauro Del Vecchio (Italy), Commander of the International Security Assistance Force (5 Aug 2005 – 4 May 2006)
- David J. Richards (U.K.), Commander of the International Security Assistance Force (4 May 2006 – 6 Feb 2007)
- General (USA) Dan K. McNeill, Commander of the International Security Assistance Force (6 Feb 2007 – 3 Jun 2008)
- General (USA) David D. McKiernan, Commander of the International Security Assistance Force (3 Jun 2008 – 15 Jun 2009)
- General (USA) Stanley A. McChrystal, Commander of the International Security Assistance Force (15 Jun 2009 – 23 Jun 2010)
- Sir Nicholas "Nick" Parker (U.K.), acting Commander of the International Security Assistance Force (23 Jun 2010 – 4 Jul 2010)
- General (USA) David H. Petraeus, Commander of the International Security Assistance Force (4 Jul 2010 – 18 Jul 2011)
- General (USMC) John R. Allen, Commander of the International Security Assistance Force (18 Jul 2011 – 10 Feb 2013)
- General (USMC) Joseph F. Dunford, Jr., Commander of the International Security Assistance Force (10 Feb 2013 – 26 Aug 2014)
- General (USA) John F. Campbell, Commander of the International Security Assistance Force (26 Aug 2014 – 28 Dec 2014)

- Commanders of the Resolute Support Mission (RSM)

- General (USA) John F. Campbell, Commander of the Resolute Support Mission (28 Dec 2014 – 2 Mar 2016)
- General (USA) John "Mick" W. Nicholson Jr., Commander of the Resolute Support Mission (2 Mar 2016 – 2 Sep 2018)
- General (USA) Austin Scott Miller, Commander of the Resolute Support Mission (2 Sep 2018 – 12 July 2021)
- General (USA) Kenneth F. McKenzie Jr., Commander of the Resolute Support Mission (12 July 2021 – 31 August 2021)

- Iraq sovereign country, occupied by the United States (2003–2011)
- Commanders of Multi-National Force – Iraq

- Lieutenant General (USA) Ricardo S. Sanchez, Commander of Multi-National Force Iraq (14 Jun 2003 – 1 Jul 2004)
- General (USA) George W. Casey Jr., Commander of Multi-National Force Iraq (1 Jul 2004 – 10 Feb 2007)
- General (USA) David H. Petraeus, Commander of Multi-National Force Iraq (10 Feb 2007 – 16 Sep 2008)
- General (USA) Raymond T. Odierno, Commander of Multi-National Force Iraq (16 Sep 2008 – 1 Sep 2010)
- General (USA) Lloyd Austin, Commander of Multi-National Force Iraq (September 1, 2010 – December 18, 2011)

- Administrators of the Coalition Provisional Authority

- Lieutenant General (USA) Jay Garner (21 April 2003 – 12 May 2003) as Director of the Office for Reconstruction and Humanitarian Assistance
- Paul Bremer (12 May 2003 – 28 June 2004)

- Haiti (February 2004 – July 2004)
- U.S. Commanding General, Combined Joint Task Force Haiti and Commander of the Multinational Interim Force in Haiti (MIF)

- Lieutenant General (USMC) Ronald S. Coleman, U.S. Commanding General (29 Feb 2004 – 1 Jun 2004)

- U.S. Commanders of the Joint Task Force for Haiti (JTF-H)

- Lieutenant General (USA) P.K. "Ken" Keen, Commander of the Joint Task Force for Haiti (14 Jan 2010 – 18 Apr 2010)
- Major General (USA) Simeon G. Trombitas, Commander of the Joint Task Force for Haiti (18 Apr 2010 – 1 Jun 2010)

== See also ==
- Antarctic Treaty System
- List of state leaders in the 21st century
