= List of current British colonial governors =

This is a list of currently serving governors, administrators and commissioners of the British Overseas Territories.

Portrait	Name	Title	Took office	Overseas Territory	Flag
	Her Excellency Julia Crouch OBE	Governor of Anguilla	11 September 2023	Anguilla	
	His Excellency Air Commodore Nigel Phillips CBE	Governor of Ascension (Note: The Governor of Saint Helena is ex officio the Governor of Ascension following the St Helena, Ascension and Tristan da Cunha Constitution Order 2009.)	13 August 2022	Ascension	
	His Excellency Commander Andrew Murdoch CMG	Governor of Bermuda	23 January 2025	Bermuda	
	Jane Rumble OBE FRGS	Commissioner for the British Antarctic Territory	February 2025	British Antarctic Territory	
	Nishi Dholakia	Commissioner for the British Indian Ocean Territory	2024	British Indian Ocean Territory	
	His Excellency Daniel Pruce	Governor of the Virgin Islands	29 January 2024	British Virgin Islands	
	Her Excellency Jane Owen	Governor of the Cayman Islands	21 April 2023	Cayman Islands	
	His Excellency Colin Martin-Reynolds CMG	Governor of the Falkland Islands (Note: The Governor of the Falkland Islands is ex officio also the Commissioner for South Georgia and the South Sandwich Islands.)	29 July 2025	Falkland Islands	
	His Excellency Lieutenant General Sir Ben Bathurst KCVO CBE	Governor of Gibraltar	4 June 2024	Gibraltar	
	Her Excellency Harriet Cross	Governor of Montserrat	23 April 2025	Montserrat	
	Her Excellency Louise Cantillon	Governor of Pitcairn (Note: The British High Commissioner to New Zealand is ex officio also the Governor of Pitcairn.)	18 August 2022	Pitcairn Islands	
	His Excellency Air Commodore Nigel Phillips CBE	Governor of Saint Helena (Note: The Governor of Saint Helena is ex officio also the Governor of Ascension and Governor of Tristan da Cunha following the St Helena, Ascension and Tristan da Cunha Constitution Order 2009.)	13 August 2022	Saint Helena	
	His Excellency Colin Martin-Reynolds CMG	Commissioner for South Georgia and the South Sandwich Islands (Note: The Governor of the Falkland Islands is ex officio the Commissioner for South Georgia and the South Sandwich Islands.)	29 July 2025	South Georgia and the South Sandwich Islands	
	Major General Tom Bewick OBE	Administrator of the Sovereign Base Areas (Note: The Commander of British Forces Cyprus is ex officio the Administrator of Akrotiri and Dhekelia.)	11 April 2025	Akrotiri and Dhekelia	
	His Excellency Air Commodore Nigel Phillips CBE	Governor of Tristan da Cunha (Note: The Governor of Saint Helena is ex officio the Governor of Tristan da Cunha following the St Helena, Ascension and Tristan da Cunha Constitution Order 2009.)	13 August 2022	Tristan da Cunha	
	Her Excellency Dileeni Daniel-Selvaratnam	Governor of the Turks and Caicos Islands	29 June 2023	Turks and Caicos Islands	

== See also ==
- British Overseas Territories
