= Politics of Saint Helena, Ascension and Tristan da Cunha =

Political structure of UK overseas territories

The politics of Saint Helena, Ascension and Tristan da Cunha operate under the jurisdiction of the government of the United Kingdom. The three parts of the territory—Saint Helena, Ascension Island and Tristan da Cunha—effectively form an asymmetric federacy and collectively constitute one of United Kingdom's fourteen overseas territories.

== Structure of government ==
Because of the islands' status as an overseas territory of the United Kingdom, they are currently ruled over by Charles III and his government in the United Kingdom, with the Governor of Saint Helena serving as the monarch's representative to the territory as well as the territory's executive. This position is currently held by Belinda Lewis, who took office in 2026. Island Administrators serve as the representatives of the Governor on Ascension and Tristan da Cunha, which are distant from Saint Helena island, and are permanently resident on those islands. These roles are presently filled by Colin Wells and Sean Burns respectively. The territory's Governor and Attorney General reside at Jamestown on Saint Helena.

Part	Crown representative	Council
Saint Helena	Governor of Saint Helena	Legislative Council of Saint Helena
Ascension Island	Administrator of Ascension Island	Ascension Island Council
Tristan da Cunha	Administrator of Tristan da Cunha	Tristan da Cunha Island Council

=== Formation and Constitution, 1922–present ===
In September 1922, Ascension Island became a dependency of Saint Helena, followed by Tristan da Cunha in January 1938. The three islands were held under this flagship as "Saint Helena and Dependencies" until they were collectively changed to equal status in 2009, becoming Saint Helena, Ascension and Tristan da Cunha.

A new constitution, the St Helena, Ascension and Tristan da Cunha Constitution Order 2009, replaced a previous constitution drafted in 1988, providing a Bill of Rights for citizens and details outlining balanced provisions for the islands. It confirmed the allegiance of the three islands to the United Kingdom, its Government and the Crown and that the islands now formed a single, territorial grouping. The constitution also placed restrictions on the governor's power, forming more of a union between the Governor and the two Resident Administrators.

=== Attorney General of Saint Helena ===
The current Attorney General of St Helena is Andrew James Duncan.

the post of the Attorney General of Saint Helena was created around 1978. Beforehand, the "Legal Advisers Office", as it was called at that time, was to provide legal advice to the St. Helena Government and the Judiciary and legal support to the Land Adjudication exercise."

Attorney General of Saint Helena (Incomplete Table)
Name	Year(s) of Service)
Alan Hoole	c. 1978-1983
Ken Baddon	c. 1986–1989
Alan Hoole	c. 1989–1990
David J. Jeremiah	c. 1991-1997
Kurt De Freitas	c. 1997-2004
Ken Baddon	c. 2005-2013
Frank Wastell	c. 2013-2014
Nicola Moore	c. 2014-2016
Angelo Berbotto	c. 2016-2018
Sara O'Donnell	c. 2018-2019
Allen Cansick	c. 2018-2019
David Ballantyne	c. 2022-2024
Andrew James Duncan	c. 2024-2026

Antony Rushford is identified as having been the Attorney General of Saint Helena. However, his years of service are unknown. Rushford had also served as the Attorney General of Anguilla and Attorney General of Grenada.

== Media ==
Each of the islands offers radio stations and local newspapers. While there are no locally operated TV stations anywhere in the territory, overseas programming is broadcast via satellite in St. Helena. Cable and Wireless Communications, based in the UK, operates its telecommunications infrastructure.

The BBC Atlantic Relay Station transmits radio programs to Ascension Island, but television service is limited to the British Forces Broadcasting Service. A radio station operated by the US Air Force, "Volcano Radio", also carries locally produced programming.

On Tristan da Cunha, Atlantic FM carries local broadcasts. BFBS TV is also available. The island's first internet cafe opened in 2006.

== Judiciary ==
The territory has four courts of its own:

- Court of Appeal
- Supreme Court
- Magistrates Court
- Juvenile Court

Former Governor Nigel Phillips appointed Sir John Henry Boulton Saunders and H H Michael Paul Yelton as the President and the Justice respectively of the Saint Helena Court of Appeal from 2023 to 2026. The Judicial Committee of the Privy Council, in London, is the final court of appeal for the territory however, as is the case with all other British overseas territories.

Criminal matters are investigated by the Saint Helena Police Service and prosecuted at court by the Crown Prosecutor. The current Crown Prosecutor is Sophie Jayne Evans, having been appointed on 30 January 2026.

Crown Prosecutor of St. Helena (Incomplete table)
Name	Year(s) of Service
Aine Hurley	2014-2019
Amanda Bailey	2019-2019
Shardae Oliver	2020-2021
Ben Brown	2021–2022
Simon Dykes	2023 - 2025
Sophie Jayne Evans	2026 - Present

== Public Solicitor ==
Although there are no private practice lawyers on Saint Helena, there is a Public Solicitor (the office was established on January 2, 1998) that is supported by legally-trained lay advocates. They provide legal advice and assistance to residents, as well as offer court representation whenever appropriate. Depending on the severity of the case, a lawyer from the United Kingdom might be sent for to represent a defendant.

Public Solicitor of St. Helena (Complete Table)
Name	Year(s) of Service
Jonathan Hardiker	c. 1998-2001
Colin Forbes	c. 2001-2006
Jane Hamilton-White (1st female)	c. 2006-2008
Neil Davidson	c. 2008-2011
Debbie Wahle	c. 2011-2015
Nicholas Aldridge	c. 2015-2017
Sara O'Donnell	c. 2017
Helen Scott	c. 2018
Duncan Cooke	c. 2018-2020
Ruth Barber	c. 2021–2023
Walter Scott	c. 2023 - Present
