= LGBTQ rights in Saint Helena, Ascension and Tristan da Cunha =

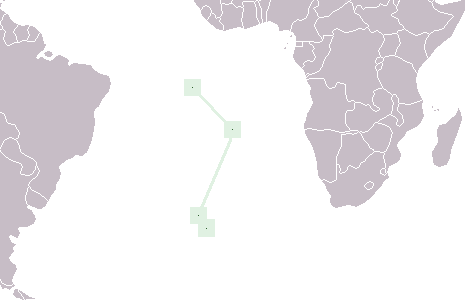
- Saint Helena, Ascension and Tristan da Cunha
- Legal status: Legal
- Gender identity: -
- Military: UK responsible for defense
- Discrimination protections: Yes (on the basis of sexual orientation only), since 2009

Family rights
- Recognition of relationships: Same-sex marriage legal since 2017
- Adoption: Yes since 2017

Lesbian, gay, bisexual and transgender (LGBT) rights in the British Overseas Territory of Saint Helena, Ascension and Tristan da Cunha have gradually evolved over the years. Discrimination on the basis of sexual orientation is banned in the entire territory through the Constitution Order 2009 and same-sex marriage has been legal on the islands since 2017.

== Legality of same-sex sexual activity ==
Homosexuality is legal in Saint Helena, Ascension and Tristan da Cunha.

== Recognition of same-sex relationships ==
Same-sex marriage has been legal on Ascension Island since 1 January 2017, on Tristan da Cunha since 4 August 2017, and since 20 December 2017 on Saint Helena.

=== Ascension Island ===
An ordinance allowing same-sex marriage was approved by the Ascension Island Council on 31 May 2016, in a 5–0 vote. It was signed by the Governor and published in the official gazette on 20 June. On 23 December 2016, the Governor issued an order to commence the law on 1 January 2017.

31 May 2016 vote in the Ascension Island Council
Votes for	Votes against	Absent
5: Jacqui Ellick; Keturah George; Nicholas John; Cyril Leo; Caroline Yon	0	1: Samantha Arms-Lawrence

=== Tristan da Cunha ===
On 23 February 2017, after consultation with the Governor of Saint Helena, the Tristan da Cunha Island Council agreed that a law to legalise same-sex marriage would go forward formally for adoption. On 4 August, the Marriages (Tristan da Cunha) Ordinance, 2017, extending the application of the Marriage (Ascension) Ordinance, 2016 to Tristan da Cunha, was signed by the Governor and published in the official gazette. It took effect upon publication.

=== Saint Helena ===
On 27 April 2016, the Saint Helena Executive Council announced a public consultation on a draft of a new marriage ordinance, which, if approved, would allow same-sex couples to marry. The consultation lasted until 25 May, and revealed a majority of respondents in favour of same-sex marriage. On 15 November 2016, the Executive Council decided to allow a same-sex marriage bill to proceed to the Legislative Council, after the draft bill underwent a number of technical issues addressed by the Attorney General.

On 12 December 2016, after a lengthy debate, the Legislative Council passed an amendment removing the provisions allowing same-sex marriage from the bill, which led to the entire bill being withdrawn.

In January 2017, a same-sex couple applied to marry in Saint Helena. The registrar was in the process of obtaining legal advice as to how to proceed (the existing Marriage Ordinance 1851 being unclear on same-sex marriage) when two members of the public filed caveats (objections) to the marriage notice. Subsequently, the registrar referred the issue to the Chief Justice of the Saint Helena Supreme Court for a decision. A preliminary hearing took place in the court on 23 February 2017. The parties in the case were given until July 2017 to submit their arguments.

At the Legislative Council meeting on 22 September 2017, members agreed to notify the Council as to their opinions on the subject at a later meeting. This would allow another same-sex marriage ordinance to be debated before the end of the year, and avoid a full Supreme Court hearing on the issue, which was expected in January 2018.

On 6 October 2017, the Legislative Council decided to conduct a series of public consultations on the bill throughout the month. On 4 December, the Social & Community Development Committee, which conducted the consultations, recommended the Executive Council to approve the draft ordinance with one minor technical amendment, which the Executive Council did the following day. On 19 December, after a failed attempt to remove the same-sex marriage portion of the legislation, the ordinance was approved by the Legislative Council by a 9–2 vote. It was subsequently signed by the Governor of Saint Helena, becoming the Marriage Ordinance 2017, and took effect upon publication on 20 December 2017.

19 December 2017 vote in the Legislative Council of Saint Helena
Voted for	Voted against	Abstained
9: Clint Beard; Cruyff Buckley; Gavin Ellick; Anthony Green; Lawson Henry; Kylie Hercules; Christine Scipio-O'Dean; Derek Thomas; Russel Yon	2: Brian Isaac; Cyril Leo	1: Corinda Essex

The first same-sex marriage in Saint Helena took place on 31 December 2018.

== Discrimination protections ==
The St Helena, Ascension and Tristan da Cunha Constitution Order 2009 bans discrimination based on sexual orientation. Article 21 reads:

[T]he expression "discriminatory" means affording different treatment to different persons on any ground such as sex, sexual orientation, race, colour, language, religion, political or other opinion, national or social origin, association with a national minority, property, age, disability, birth or other status.

The Equality and Human Rights Commission is charged with monitoring human rights laws in Saint Helena, promoting "understanding of the importance of equality" and working towards the elimination of unlawful discrimination. The Commission may also conduct inquiries and investigations on persons suspected of having committed an unlawful act. This includes whether a person has unlawfully discriminated on the basis of sexual orientation or "gender reassignment". Under the Commission for Equality and Human Rights Ordinance 2015, sexual orientation is defined as "a person's sexual orientation towards— (a) persons of the same sex; (b) persons of the opposite sex; or (c) persons of either sex". Gender reassignment is defined as "an intended, current or past process (or part of such a process) for the purpose of reassigning a person's sex by changing physiological or other attributes of sex or the state of mind whereby a person psychologically identifies with a gender inconsistent or not culturally associated with their assigned sex at birth".

== Adoption and parenting ==
Under the Saint Helena Welfare of Children Ordinance 2010 (which applies to Saint Helena and Tristan da Cunha) and the Ascension Island Child Welfare Ordinance 2011 (which applies to Ascension Island), single and married people may adopt, regardless of sexual orientation.

According to a 2006 UK Government report, there have been no adoptions in Saint Helena or Ascension Island for many years.

== Summary table ==
Same-sex sexual activity legal	Yes
Equal age of consent	Yes
Anti-discrimination laws in employment only	Yes (Since 2009)
Anti-discrimination laws in the provision of goods and services	Yes (Since 2009)
Anti-discrimination laws all other areas (incl. indirect discrimination, hate speech)	Yes (Since 2009)
Same-sex marriage	Yes (Since 2017)
Recognition of same-sex couples	Yes (Since 2017)
Stepchild adoption by same-sex couples	Yes (Since 2017)
Joint adoption by same-sex couples	Yes (Since 2017)
LGBT allowed to serve openly in the military	Yes (Since 2000, UK responsible for defence)
Right to change legal gender	
Access to IVF for lesbians	
Commercial surrogacy for gay male couples	No (Banned for heterosexuals as well)
MSMs allowed to donate blood	No

== See also ==
- LGBTQ rights in Africa
- LGBTQ rights in the United Kingdom
- Politics of Saint Helena, Ascension and Tristan da Cunha
- Leendert Hasenbosch, a Dutch sailor who in 1725 was marooned on Ascension Island as a punishment for sodomy
