= James Harford =

British diplomat (1899–1993)

Sir James Harford

Sir James Dundas Harford KBE CMG (7 January 1899 – 26 November 1993) was a British diplomat who served as Governor of Saint Helena from 1954 to 1958.

== Biography ==
A direct descendant of John Scandrett Harford of Blaise Castle, he was educated at Repton School and Balliol College, Oxford. Between school and university he enlisted as a second lieutenant in 2nd Battalion Essex Regiment and saw action in France between 1917 and 1918. After a period as a schoolmaster at Eton College from 1922 to 1926, Harford joined the Colonial Administration Service and was posted to Nigeria (1926–1934).

He was subsequently appointed:

- Administrator of Antigua and Federal Secretary of the Leeward Islands (1936–1940);
- Administrator of Saint Kitts and Nevis (1940–1946);
- Acting Governor of the Leeward Islands (various periods between 1937 and 1946);
- Companion of the Order of St Michael and St George (1943);
- To serve in the Colonial Office (1946–1947);
- Colonial Secretary of Mauritius (1948–1953);
- Acting Governor of Mauritius (1948 and 1950);
- Governor and Commander-in-Chief of Saint Helena (1954–1958);
- Knight Commander of the Order of the British Empire (1956).

Harford Middle School in Saint Helena is named in his honour.

He was married twice:

1. (14 March 1932) to Countess Thelma Alberta Louisa Evelyne Metaxà (died 22 October 1934), sister of 9th Count Metaxà, and only daughter of Count Andrea Francis Albert Cochrane Metaxà RNR; 1 son.
2. (20 February 1937) to Lilias Madeline (died 9 December 2006), eldest daughter of Major Archibald Campbell AEC; 2 daughters.

Government offices
Preceded by Hubert Eugène Bader	Administrator of Antigua; 1936–1941	Succeeded by Herbert Boon
Preceded by Douglas Roy Stewart	Administrator of Saint Christopher-Nevis-Anguilla; 1940–1947	Succeeded by Leslie Stuart Greening
Preceded by George Joy	Governor and Commander-in-Chief of Saint Helena; 1954–1958	Succeeded by Robert Edmund Alford
