= Mike Hentley =

British diplomat

Michael Hentley

Tristan Administrator
- In office May 2004 – September 2007
- Preceded by: Bill Dickson
- Succeeded by: David Morley

Personal details
- Spouse: Janis Hentley
- Website: Tristan Government Home

Michael Hentley was the Administrator for the British overseas territory of Tristan da Cunha, which is situated in the South Atlantic Ocean. He reported to Michael Clancy, who was the Governor, and was based in Saint Helena.

As the administrator, Hentley was head of government and acted in accordance with advice from Tristan da Cunha's Island Council which is composed of eight elected and three appointed members.

Hentley lived on Tristan da Cunha from May 2004 with his wife Janis until he left the island on 13 September 2007, the day his responsibility ended and the new Administrator's began.

On 12 September 2007, a party in the Prince Philip Hall was held by Hentley to welcome his successor, David Morley who had arrived on the S. A. Agulhas that day. The next day Hentley left for Gough Island on the very same ship.

Hentley is in his retirement back in the United Kingdom.

== See also ==
- Administrator of Tristan da Cunha
