= Miriam Janisch =

South African born educational administrator

Miriam Janisch OBE (7 November 1901 – 2 October 1984) was a South African-born educational administrator. As Assistant Director of Education in Kenya from 1943 to 1957, she expanded educational provision for girls in Kenya.

== Life ==
Miriam Janisch was born in Cape Town to William Jänisch and Hilda Frances Hobson. She was of English and German descent. She had a brother, Rev. Hubert William Janisch, and palaeobotanist Edna Pauline Plumstead was one of her sisters. Hudson Ralph Janisch, Governor of St Helena, was her grandfather.

She graduated at the University of the Witwatersrand before studying anthropology at the University of Cambridge. She matriculated at Newnham College, Cambridge in 1934. Returning to South Africa, she taught at the Jeppe High School for Girls, lectured in English at the Johannesburg College of Education, and worked for eight years as a Social Research Officer for Non-European and Native Affairs in Johannesburg. In 1940, she undertook detailed research on black family income and expenditure in the city.

In 1943, she joined the Colonial Education Service, working for the Education Department in Kenya. There she was also active in the East Africa Women’s League. In 1947, as Assistant Director of Education in Kenya, she spoke at the first Conference on the Education of Women and Girls. She was still Assistant Director of Education in Kenya in the early 1950s, and was appointed an Officer of the Order of the British Empire for her achievements there in 1957.

In 1960, she became Warden of Women Students at the University of Nairobi.

== Works ==
- A study of African income and expenditure in 987 families in Johannesburg, January–November, 1940, Johannesburg, 1941.
- 'Some administrative aspects of native marriage problems in an urban area', Bantu Studies, Vol. 15, Issue 1, 1941
- 'Educating Young Nations', Nature, vol. 188, 1960, pp.262–263.
