= Administrator of the government =

Government officer

An administrator (administrator of the government or officer administering the government) in the constitutional practice of some countries in the Commonwealth is a person who fulfils a role similar to that of a governor or a governor-general.

== Temporary administrators ==
Usually the office of administrator is a temporary appointment, for periods during which the governor is incapacitated, outside the territory, or otherwise unable to perform his or her duties. The process for selecting administrators varies from country to country.

=== Australia ===
In the absence of the Governor-General of Australia, the administration of the government of the Commonwealth is assumed by the longest-serving available State governor. By convention each State governor is given a dormant commission to administer the Commonwealth in the absence from Australia, or the death, incapacity or removal from office of the governor-general by the Sovereign on appointment, ensuring that there are multiple people who are able to assume the administration of the Commonwealth.

When the governors of the states of Australia are absent from their states, assume the administration of the government of the Commonwealth, are incapable of performing their office, die, or are removed from office by the Sovereign, the state's lieutenant-governor will assume the administration of the government of the state. If both the governor and lieutenant-governor are unable to administer a state government, an Administrator will assume the administration of the government. This administrator is often the chief justice of the state's supreme court, or in their absence, the next most senior puisne judge who is available.

An administrator may also be specially appointed. When Governor-General David Hurley and all state Governors were simultaneously absent from the Commonwealth to attend the Coronation of Charles III and Camilla in May 2023, Hurley's predecessor as governor-general, Sir Peter Cosgrove was specially commissioned to act as Administrator of the Government of the Commonwealth of Australia.

=== Canada ===
An "administrator of the government" in Canada is a constitutional practice where an individual is empowered to perform the functions of the office of the governor general if the governor general is incapable of rendering their constitutional duties, or if the position of Governor General is vacant following a resignation or death. The provisions to select the administrator of the government in Canada is outlined in Article VIII of the Letters Patent, 1947; which identifies that the Chief Justice of Canada assumes the role as administrator should the need arise. In the absence of the chief justice, the senior Puisne Justice of the Supreme Court of Canada is designated as the administrator of the government. Prior to the Letters Patent, 1947, the administrator of the government was directly appointed by the monarch. An administrator of the government is not required if a governor general is absent for less than 30 days, with the governor general empowered to designate a "deputy governor general" to act on their behalf. Richard Wagner is the most recent in Canada designated as the "administrator of the government," having been sworn in to the position on 23 January 2021 after Governor General Payette resigned. He served as administrator until the Queen appointed Mary Simon as governor general on 26 July 2021, on the advice of Prime Minister Justin Trudeau.

The constitutional practice of an "administrator of the government" is also found within the provinces of Canada, with provincial administrators of the government assuming the functions of the office of the lieutenant governor if its holder is incapable of rendering their duties. The federal government typically appoints the chief justice of each province as the provincial administrator of government. Unlike the federal administrator, provincial administrators cannot act if the office of lieutenant governor is vacant.

The term "administrator" is also used in the Canadian territory of Yukon, although the position of administrator in Yukon is analogous to a "deputy commissioner of Yukon".

=== Ceylon ===
In Ceylon, the officer administering the government in the absence of the governor-general of Ceylon was the chief justice of Ceylon. In the absence of the chief justice the acting chief justice would serve in this place. Ceylon had two acting governors-general.

=== Hong Kong ===
When Hong Kong was a British Crown colony the chief secretary (colonial secretary before 1976) would be the acting governor, followed by the financial secretary and the attorney general. The acting governor was officially known as the officer administering the government, which they also enjoyed the prefix of "Your Excellency" as a governor would have. The practice has remained after the transfer of sovereignty to China. Rotation takes place between the chief secretary for administration (formerly chief secretary), the financial secretary and the secretary for justice (formerly attorney general) as the acting chief executive.

=== New Zealand ===
Under the Governor-General Act 2010, there are certain times where the chief justice, currently Helen Winkelmann, will fulfil the role of administrator of the government (acting governor-general). These times may be when the governor-general is outside New Zealand, or is incapacitated or otherwise unable to carry out their duties, or more prominently when the position is vacant . If the chief justice is unable to become administrator of the government for similar reasons as above then the title follows the order of seniority in the judicial system.

=== Papua New Guinea ===
As a former external territory of Australia, the head of the territory's administration was called the administrator of Papua-New Guinea before independence in 1975. The appointment was by the governor-general of Australia on the advice of the Australian minister of external territories. The minister for external territories consulted with the territory's chief minister as part of the appointment process.

=== Rhodesia ===
On 11 November 1965, the self-governing British colony of Southern Rhodesia made a unilateral declaration of independence (UDI) although it continued to recognise the British monarch, Queen Elizabeth II, as head of state, with oaths of allegiance to "Her Majesty the Queen Elizabeth, Queen of Rhodesia, her heirs and successors". However, the Rhodesian Front government of Ian Smith ceased to recognise the authority of her de jure representative, Governor Sir Humphrey Gibbs.

Instead, on 17 November, it appointed the former deputy prime minister, Clifford Dupont, to the post of "acting officer administering the government". Opponents of UDI who considered it an illegal move, such as the independent member of the legislative assembly, Ahrn Palley, refused to recognise Dupont's office, and walked out of the opening of the Parliament of Rhodesia when Dupont came to deliver the Speech from the Throne.

On 2 December, Smith wrote a personal letter to the Queen, asking her to accept Dupont as the new governor-general. In response, he was told that "Her Majesty is not able to entertain purported advice of this kind, and has therefore been pleased to direct that no action shall be taken upon it".

Under the 1965 draft constitution, if the Queen did not appoint a governor-general within fourteen days of advice being tendered by the prime minister, a regent was to be appointed. In deference to the royal family, however, on 16 December, Smith amended his original plan to appoint a regent and Dupont was appointed as "officer administering the government".

Consequently, legislation passed after UDI was "enacted by His Excellency the Officer Administering the Government, as the representative of the Queen's Most Excellent Majesty, by and with the advice and consent of the Parliament of Rhodesia". Dupont would continue to use the title until 1970. When Rhodesia adopted a republican constitution that year, he became the first President of Rhodesia, a position that was internationally unrecognised, given the fact that Rhodesia was de jure a British colony.

The country was renamed Zimbabwe Rhodesia in 1979, before it returned to colonial status following the Lancaster House Agreement later that year. In 1980, it achieved internationally recognised independence as Zimbabwe, becoming a republic in the Commonwealth of Nations.

== Permanent administrators ==
The term administrator is also used for a permanent officer representing the head of state where the appointment of a governor would be inappropriate; it is also used for the representative of a governor.

=== Australia ===
- In the Internal Northern Territory, the office of Administrator is a permanent appointment, and since the territory was granted self-government in 1978, the office of administrator has become a largely ceremonial appointment, like that of the governor in each state. Unlike the governors, who are appointed by the sovereign on advice of the premier, the administrator is appointed by the governor-general on advice of the prime minister after consultation with the chief minister.
- External territories such as Norfolk Island and Indian Ocean Territories (including Christmas Island and Cocos (Keeling) Islands)
- Historically also on Lord Howe Island

There is no administrator in the Australian Capital Territory and the chief minister is elected by the legislative assembly.

=== India ===
In the Union territories of India, which are ruled directly by the Union government, the President of India appoints an administrator. Administrators differ from the governors of the states of India in that they are a representative of the president and not a head of state.

The president may also appoint the governor of a neighbouring state to be the administrator of a union territory. Since 1985 the Governor of Punjab has acted as the Administrator of Chandigarh. And Administrator of Lakshadweep also rules Dadra and Nagar Haveli and Daman and Diu. In five union territories: Andaman and Nicobar Islands, Delhi, Jammu and Kashmir, Ladakh and Puducherry; the administrator uses the title "lieutenant governor".

=== New Zealand ===
- Tokelau has been governed by an administrator since 1949, when it was attached to New Zealand (previously it was part of the British colony of the Gilbert and Ellice Islands)
- Historically in Samoa as a League of Nations and United Nations mandate (see List of colonial governors of Samoa).

=== United Kingdom overseas possessions ===
- The civil Administrator of the Akrotiri and Dhekelia Sovereign Base Areas in Cyprus is traditionally the military commander of British forces in the areas.
- The Administrator of the British Indian Ocean Territory is the junior to a commissioner (Chagos Archipelago, notably Diego Garcia. He mandates the commander of British naval forces on Diego Garcia as his representative and justice of the peace.)
- The British Overseas Territory of Saint Helena, Ascension and Tristan da Cunha consists of three equal constituent parts Saint Helena, Ascension Island, and Tristan da Cunha. The Governor of Saint Helena is ex officio also the Governor of Ascension and the Governor of Tristan da Cunha. Due to the distance of Ascension and Tristan da Cunha from Saint Helena, administrators are appointed to act on the respective governors behalf:
  - Administrator of Ascension (since June 1964)
  - Administrator of Tristan da Cunha (since 31 Jan 1950)

== Other ==
=== United States ===
In the United States, the rank of administrator denotes a high-level civilian official within the United States federal government. Generally, an official of sub-cabinet rank, an administrator is appointed by the President of the United States with the consent of the United States Senate and assigned to run a specific US government agency.

=== Israel ===
During mandatory times, the high commissioner was deputized by an administrator in case of high commissarial vacancy, and a deputy to the high commissioner when the high commissioner remained in office but temporarily could not fulfill his duties. Both posts were held ex-officio by the chief secretary. The rules for deputizing the analogous office in modern-day Israel, the president, are similar, with an interim president analogous to the administrator and an acting president analogous to the deputy to the high commissioner.

== Sources and references ==
- WorldStatesmen the present state
