= Robert Alford =

Robert Alford may refer to:

- Robert Alford (politician) (born 1950), Canadian politician
- Robert Alford (American football) (born 1988), American football cornerback
- Sir Robert Edmund Alford (1904–1979), British colonial administrator
