= Dick Baker (colonial administrator) =

British businessman (1933–2023)

Francis Eustace Baker, CBE
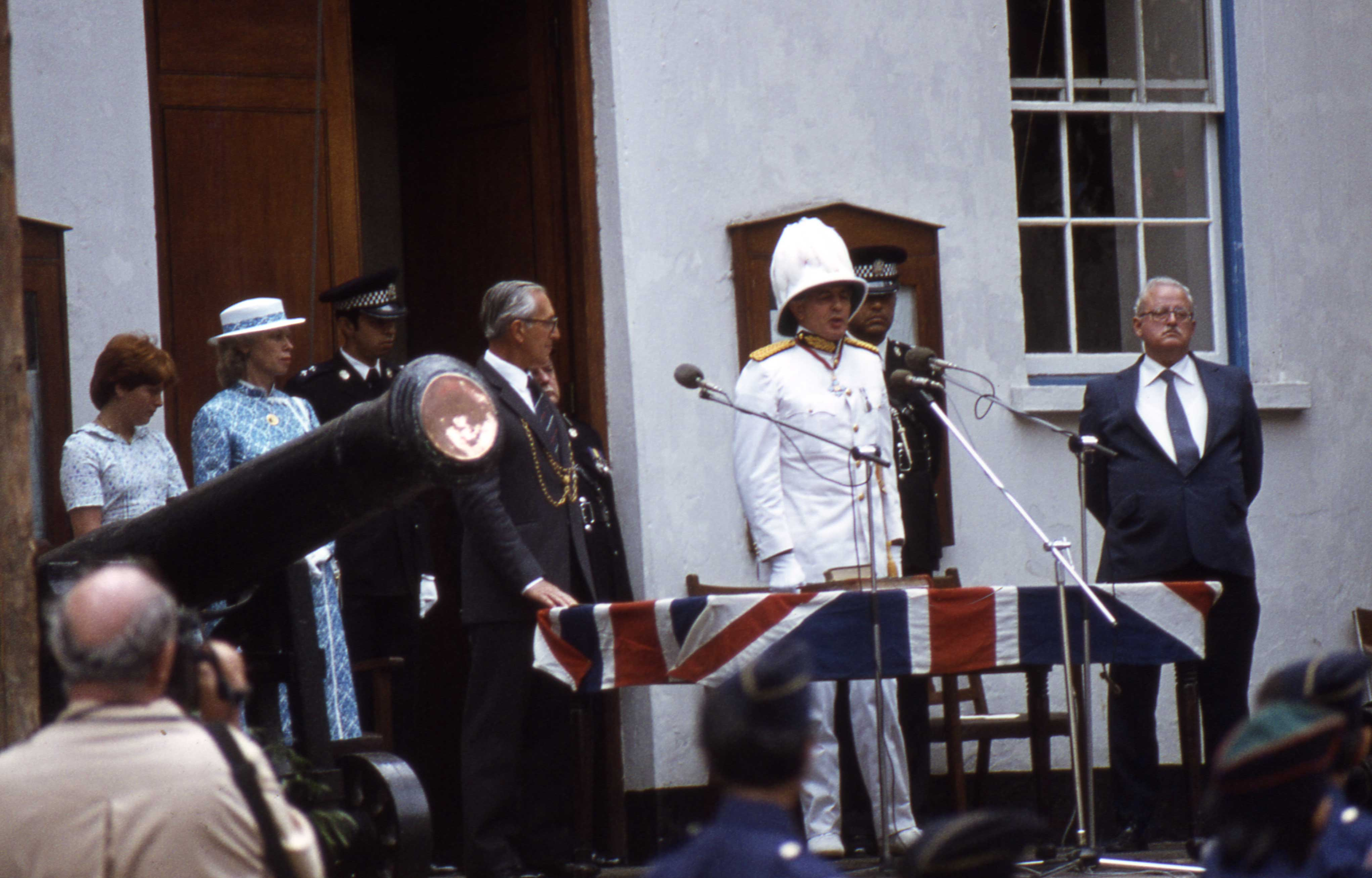
- Francis Baker, wearing ceremonial uniform, is sworn in as Governor of Saint Helena in 1984

Governor of Saint Helena, Ascension and Tristan da Cunha
- In office 3 August 1984 – 6 April 1988
- Preceded by: Sir John Dudley Massingham
- Succeeded by: Robert F. Stimson

Personal details
- Born: 19 April 1933 Sheerness, Kent, England
- Died: 16 December 2023 (aged 90)

Francis Eustace Baker CBE (19 April 1933 – 16 December 2023) was a British businessman who was the Governor of Saint Helena, Ascension and Tristan da Cunha between 1984 and 1988. While he was Governor, he implemented a "3-day working scheme" to help tackle unemployment and announced the plans to build the 2nd RMS St Helena, which was, up until the construction of St Helena's airport, the main link between the territory and the rest of the world. He received the Order of the British Empire (OBE) in 1979 and the CBE in 1984.
