= George Joy (colonial administrator) =

British colonial administrator

Sir George Joy KBE CMG
- Joy in the late 1930s

British Resident Commissioner of the New Hebrides
- In office 1927–1940
- Preceded by: Geoffrey Bingham Whistler Smith-Rewse
- Succeeded by: Richard Denis Blandy

Governor of Saint Helena
- In office 1947–1954
- Preceded by: William Bain Gray
- Succeeded by: James Harford

Personal details
- Born: 20 February 1896; London, United Kingdom
- Died: 25 April 1974 (aged 78)

Sir George Andrew Joy KBE CMG (20 February 1896 – 25 April 1974) was a British colonial administrator. He served as British Resident Commissioner of the New Hebrides from 1927 until 1940 and as Governor of Saint Helena from 1947 until 1953.

== Biography ==
Born in London, Joy attended St Francis Xavier's College in Bruges. During World War I he served in the British Army, fighting in the Flanders region. In 1924 he joined the Colonial and Foreign Office, and was appointed Assistant Resident Commissioner for the New Hebrides, where his fluency in French (learnt at school) was an asset in the joint rule with France. Four year later he was promoted to Resident Commissioner, also becoming Consul for the Western Pacific, and joint Consul for the Hoorn and Wallis Islands.

Joy remained in post in the New Hebrides until 1940, when he was appointed Resident Adviser to two sultans in Aden Protectorate, Saleh bin Ghalib Al-Qu'aiti of Qu'aiti and Dscha'far ibn al-Mansur al-Kathir of Kathiri. In 1942 he became Civil Secretary in the Colony of Aden government. He was made a Companion of the Order of St Michael and St George in the 1945 New Year Honours.

Joy was subsequently appointed Governor of Saint Helena in 1947. In the 1949 Birthday Honours he was made a Knight Commander of the Order of the British Empire. He retired in 1953. After retiring, he founded the Strutt Research Fund alongside Arthur Strutt and W.H. Salter. He also became treasurer and secretary of the Society for Psychical Research.

He died in April 1974.
