= Tony Humphries =

Tony Humphries may refer to:

- Tony Humphries (administrator), former administrator of the British Indian Ocean Territory
- Tony Humphries (musician) (born 1957), DJ and producer
