= List of state leaders in the 21st century =

Lists of state leaders in the 21st century include:

- List of state leaders in the 2000s
- List of state leaders in the 2010s
- List of state leaders in the 2020s
- List of current heads of state and government
- List of governors of dependent territories in the 21st century
