= Dermod Murphy =

Irish-born British colonial administrator

Sir Dermod Art Pelly Murphy CMG OBE (10 August 1914 – 21 October 1975) was an Irish-born British colonial administrator. He was Governor of Saint Helena from 1968 to 1971.

Educated at Trinity College, Dublin and Oriel College, Oxford, Murphy entered the Colonial Service in 1938. Before being appointed to Saint Helena, he had served in Nigeria.

He was appointed OBE in 1955, CMG in 1960, and knighted in 1969.
