= Geoffrey Colin Guy =

Geoffrey Colin Guy CMG, CVO, OBE (4 November 1921 – 1 December 2006) was the last Commissioner and the first Administrator of the Turks and Caicos from 1958 to 1959 and 1959 to 1965 respectively. Mr. Guy was succeeded by John Anthony Golding in 1965. He was administrator during Hurricane Donna, which in 1960 devastated agriculture on the island. He was managing director of the salt industry on the islands and used profits from the commodity to build airstrips and lay the foundation for today's main industry – tourism.

Guy was an RAF photo-reconnaissance pilot during World War II in the Burmese campaign against the invading Japanese. His memoir, Geoffrey Guy's War, (Amberley Books. 2012), records his experiences in the RAF. Post-war he was a District Commissioner in Sierra Leone where he helped to control the riots which occurred as British rule came to an end.

Following his service in Turks and Caicos, he was Administrator and then Governor of Dominica from 1965 until 1967. In 1973, he became the Administrator of Ascension, where he served until 1976. He subsequently served as Governor of Saint Helena from 1976 to 1980. In 1980, he stood for election to Saint Helena's Legislative Council and served as its Speaker until his retirement at the 1985 election.

Guy stayed on in Saint Helena until 1992 when he and his wife Joan moved to a Yorkshire village, Kirk Hammerton, where he lived until his death. They are survived by their son Ben.
