= Robert Frederick Stimson =

British diplomat

Governor of Saint Helena, Ascension and Tristan da Cunha
- In office 1988–1991
- Preceded by: Francis Eustace Baker
- Succeeded by: Alan Hoole

Robert Frederick Stimson CBE was the Governor of Saint Helena, Ascension and Tristan da Cunha between 1988 and 1991. While he was Governor, he presided over the opening of St. Andrew's School on the island, and made several constitutional and electoral reforms, such as lowering the voting age on the island from 21 to 18, and redrawing the territory's electoral districts.

He was awarded the CBE in December 1991.
