= David Hollamby =

Governor of Saint Helena

David J Hollamby

Governor of Saint Helena, Ascension and Tristan da Cunha
- In office 24 June 1999 – 29 September 2004
- Preceded by: David Leslie Smallman
- Succeeded by: Michael Clancy

David James Hollamby (1945–2016) served as Governor of Saint Helena from 24 June 1999 to 29 September 2004. He was preceded by David Leslie Smallman and succeeded by Michael Clancy. He oversaw the return of British citizenship to citizens of the island in May 2002. He was also responsible, alongside the FCO for rejecting SHELCO's airport proposals for the island, which resulted in protests.
