= Pearce Commission =

The Commission on Rhodesian Opinion, also known as the Pearce Commission, was a British commission set up in 1971 to test the acceptability of a proposed constitutional settlement in Rhodesia. It was created by the Foreign and Commonwealth Secretary Sir Alec Douglas-Home. The commission was popularly known as the Pearce Commission after its chairman, retired British judge Edward Pearce, Baron Pearce. The Pearce Commission reported in 1972 that although the European, Coloured, and Asian communities of Rhodesia were in favour of the proposals, the African population rejected them.

== Background ==
The commission was established on 25 November 1971, pursuant to the terms of the Proposals for Settlement agreed between the British and Rhodesian governments on 21 November 1971. The settlement recognised Rhodesia's 1969 constitution as the legal frame of government, while agreeing that gradual legislative representation was an acceptable formula for unhindered advance to majority rule. Nevertheless, the new settlement, if approved, would also implement an immediate improvement in black political status, offer a means to terminate racial discrimination, and provide a solid guarantee against retrogressive constitutional amendments.

== Members ==
=== Chairman ===
- Lord Pearce

=== Deputy Chairmen ===
- Lord Harlech
- Sir Maurice Dorman
- Sir Glyn Jones
- Sir Frederick Pedler (withdrew on personal grounds on 7 January 1972)

=== Commissioners ===
- D. Blain
- G. R. B. Blake, OBE
- J. E. Blunden
- J. H. Burges
- P. L. Burkinshaw, OBE
- I. E. Butler
- T. H. R. Cashmore
- A. F. Dawkins (1916-2009), schoolmaster and uncle of Richard Dawkins.
- F. W. Essex, CMG
- D. F. H. H. Frost, MBE
- Freda H. Gwilliam, CBE
- J. L. S. Harrison
- J. F. Hayley, OBE
- P. A. Large
- J. D. Massingham
- M. Patey, MBE
- C. G. C. Rawlins, DFC, OBE
- J. C. Strong
- A. St. John Sugg, CMG
- A. H. Whitfield
- R. M. Allen (Statistician)

=== Secretariat ===
- H. Smedley, CMG, MBE (Secretary-General)
- J. R. L. G. Varcoe (Deputy Secretary-General)
- B. E. Pauncefort (Assistant Secretary-General (Press))
- A. B. Gundersen (Assistant Secretary)
- A. Fayle (Administrative Officer)
