= Thomas Oates (colonial administrator) =

Sir Thomas Oates, CMG, OBE (5 November 1917 – 28 June 2015) was a British colonial administrator. He was Governor of Saint Helena from 1971 to 1976.

== Notable cases ==
Tony Thornton arrived on St Helena in 1967 and remained until Oates made an Exclusion Order against him in September 1975, claiming he was a communist. Thornton was a controversial businessman who had made many changes in agriculture and standards of living. In 1975, Thornton had formed the St Helena Labour Party, aiming to contest the 1975 general election for Legislative Council, but was served the Exclusion Order before the election could be held.
