= Hudson Ralph Janisch =

Governor of St Helena from 1873 to 1890

Hudson Ralph Janisch, CMG, FRAS (died March 1884) was Governor of St Helena from 1873 until his death in 1884. He is the only St Helena-born governor of the island.

During his tenure as Governor, he was forbidden to reside at Plantation House, the governor's official residence, on economic grounds.

A grand-daughter was the South African educationalist Miriam Janisch.
