= Philip Rushbrook =

Governor of Saint Helena, Ascension and Tristan da Cunha

Philip Edward Rushbrook
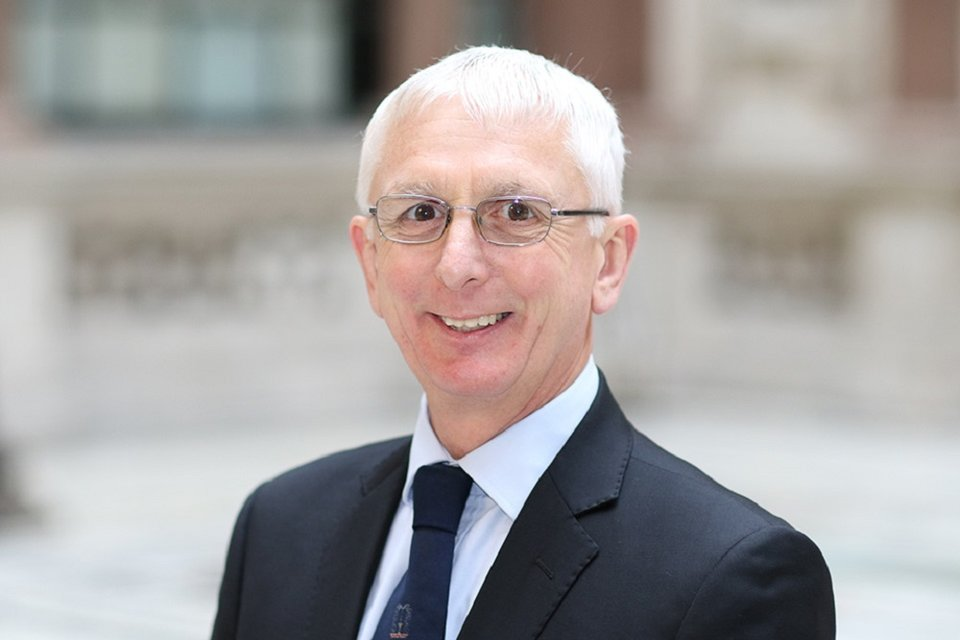

Governor of Saint Helena, Ascension and Tristan da Cunha
- In office 11 May 2019 – 20 June 2022
- Monarch: Elizabeth II
- Chief Minister: Julie Thomas
- Preceded by: Lisa Honan
- Succeeded by: Greg Gibson (acting); Nigel Phillips

Personal details
- Spouse: Janis
- Children: 2

Philip Edward Rushbrook is a British civil servant who served as Governor of Saint Helena, Ascension, and Tristan da Cunha from 2019 to 2022. Prior to his tenure as governor he was Deputy Governor of Akrotiri and Dhekelia and worked for the United Kingdom Atomic Energy Authority, Cabinet Office, and World Health Organization.

== Career ==
From 1982 to 1990, Rushbrook worked for the United Kingdom Atomic Energy Authority at the Harwell Science and Innovation Campus. He was a consultant to Gibb Environmental from 1990 to 1992, and a senior specialist for Bechtel from 1992 to 1993. He worked for the World Health Organization in Nancy, France, and Rome, Italy, from 1993 to 2001, and in Darfur, in 2008. In the Cabinet Office he was head of the Public Sector Reform Team from 2001 to 2005, and service director in the IT Development Programme from 2007 to 2008. He worked as part of the programme to resettle Afghan interpreters.

Rushbrook worked in the Foreign, Commonwealth and Development Office for the Governor of the Turks and Caicos Islands from 2011 to 2013. From 2014 to 2018, he was Deputy Governor of Akrotiri and Dhekelia. On 4 May 2019, he was appointed as the Governor of Saint Helena, Ascension, and Tristan da Cunha and Ethel Yon, the Sheriff of Saint Helena, swore him into office on 11 May. He served until Nigel Phillips was selected to replace him as governor. He left office on 20 June 2022, and was followed by Greg Gibson as acting governor before Phillips arrival on 13 August.

== Personal life ==
Rushbrook is married to Janis, with whom he had two children.

== Works cited ==
- "Arrival of new Governor of St Helena, Ascension and Tristan Da Cunha". Saint Helena. 27 June 2022. Archived from the original on 25 June 2025.
- "Dr Philip Rushbrook". Ascension Island. Archived from the original on 22 March 2020.
- "Governor inaugurated at St Helena ceremony". Tristan da Cunha. Archived from the original on 25 June 2025.
- "Philip Rushbrook". Government of the United Kingdom. Archived from the original on 25 June 2025.
