= David Leslie Smallman =

Governor of Saint Helena, Ascension and Tristan da Cunha

Governor of Saint Helena, Ascension and Tristan da Cunha
- In office 8 September 1995 – 7 May 1999
- Preceded by: Alan Norman Hoole
- Succeeded by: David Hollamby

David Leslie Smallman LVO was the Governor of Saint Helena, Ascension and Tristan da Cunha between 1995 and 1999. He obtained a promise from HM Government in 1995 to restore British Citizenship to the citizens of St Helena. This happened in 2002, under the Governorship of David Hollamby.

He was the first Governor of Saint Helena to land on Gough Island.
