= Sean Burns (administrator) =

British civil servant (1961–2023)

Administrator of Tristan da Cunha
- In office 1 December 2022 – 16 March 2023
- Preceded by: James Glass (Acting)
- Succeeded by: Lorraine Repetto (Acting)
- In office 29 November 2016 – 24 January 2020
- Preceded by: Alex Mitham
- Succeeded by: Fiona Kilpatrick
- In office 15 September 2010 – 23 September 2013
- Preceded by: David Morley
- Succeeded by: Alex Mitham

Administrator of Ascension
- In office 17 March 2020 – 2 November 2022
- Preceded by: Steven Chandler
- Succeeded by: Simon Minshull

Personal details
- Born: Sean Gilbert Peter Burns; 1961
- Died: 16 March 2023 (aged 61–62)
- Occupation: Civil servant

Sean Gilbert Peter Burns (1961 – 16 March 2023) was a British civil servant who served three terms as Administrator of Tristan da Cunha.

== Career ==
Burns was stationed in Antigua, Bangladesh, Senegal and Kenya and was also Administrator of Ascension. He later served three terms as Administrator of Tristan da Cunha (2010−2013, 2016−2020 and 2022−2023).

== Personal life and death ==
Burns had two children with his wife Marina.

On 9 March 2023 he suffered a stroke and was admitted to Camogli Hospital in Edinburgh of the Seven Seas. He died on 16 March aboard RV Meteor while en route to Cape Town for further treatment.
