= William Bain Gray =

British administrator

Major William Bain Gray, CBE (1886 – 3 February 1949) was a British colonial administrator and civil servant. He studied history at the University of Edinburgh and was awarded a PhD in 1921 for his thesis, “The military forces and the public revenue of Scotland, 1660-1688”. He was Governor of St Helena from 1941 to 1946.
