= Michael Hill (diplomat) =

British diplomat

Michael Hill is a British diplomat. Hill held the post of high commissioner to Vanuatu until September 2005 when he became the Administrator of Ascension Island, a dependency of the British overseas territory of Saint Helena. Hill was succeeded as Administrator by Ross Denny in September 2008. He is married to Elizabeth and has four children: Alastair, Victoria, Richard and Alexander.
