= Andrew Gurr (governor) =

British diplomat (born 1944)

Governor of Saint Helena, Ascension and Tristan da Cunha
- In office 11 November 2007 – 23 September 2011
- Monarch: Elizabeth II
- Preceded by: Michael Clancy
- Succeeded by: Mark Capes

Chief Executive of the Falkland Islands
- In office September 1994 – November 1999
- Monarch: Elizabeth II
- Governor: David Tatham; Richard Ralph; Donald Lamont
- Preceded by: Ronald Sampson
- Succeeded by: Michael Blanch

Personal details
- Born: Andrew Murray Gurr; 7 August 1944 (age 81)

Andrew Murray Gurr (born 7 August 1944) is a British retired politician who served as the Governor of Saint Helena from 2007 to 2011 and the Governor of Ascension and Tristan da Cunha from 2009 to 2011 (Ascencsion and Tristan da Cunha both having previously been dependencies of Saint Helena). He took up office on 11 November 2007 in a ceremony in Jamestown at which he declared his commitment to Saint Helena and dependencies in his inaugural speech. He took over from Michael Clancy with Chief Secretary Martin Hallam serving as acting Governor in the interim.

He served as Chief Executive of the Falkland Islands Government from 1994 to 1999.

In moves towards creating a more open form of Government in St Helena, since taking office in November 2007, Governor Gurr swiftly abolished the predominantly expatriate 'Senior Management Team' committee that had arisen within the St Helena Government, citing that "It has appeared to some as though this team has been making decisions and there can be little doubt that that would be unconstitutional", and immediately introduced a formal Press Report after each session of the Executive Council, summarising the main points discussed by members from both the open and closed (to the general public) sessions.

== Family ==
Andrew Gurr and his wife, Jean, resided on Saint Helena during his term of office.

Political offices
Preceded by Ronald Sampson	Chief Executive of the Falkland Islands; 1994–1999	Succeeded by Michael Blanch
Preceded by Michael Clancy	Governor of Saint Helena, Ascension and Tristan da Cunha; 2007–2011	Succeeded by Mark Capes
