= Marc Holland =

British civil servant and diplomat

His Honour Marc Holland

Deputy Governor to Gibraltar
- Incumbent
- Assumed office 1 August 2022
- Preceded by: Colin Wells

Personal details
- Born: 1974
- Education: Wadham College, University of Oxford
- Occupation: Civil servant

Marc Holland (born 1974) is a British civil servant and diplomat. From 2014 to 2017, Holland served as the Administrator of Ascension. He was the UK's deputy ambassador to Denmark from 2018 to 2022. He was named Deputy Governor of Gibraltar in 2022.

== Career ==
Holland was educated at Wadham College, Oxford.

Holland joined the Foreign and Commonwealth Office in 2002. He served as First Secretary Employment & Social Affairs to the Permanent Representative of the United Kingdom to the European Union and then First Secretary EU to Embassy of the United Kingdom in Berlin. Until 2014 he served as the deputy head of the Future of Europe Department in London. Prior to that Holland had worked Department of Trade and Industry and as a planning and information officer in the education department of the Croydon London Borough Council.

In 2014, Holland was appointed to replace Colin Wells as Administrator of Ascension. He was named Deputy Governor of Gibraltar in 2022.

== Personal life ==
Holland was married, and has five children.
