= Anne Laubies =

French civil servant (born 1953)

Anne Laubies (born August 14, 1953, Bir El Kouach, Morocco) is a French civil servant who as of 2015 is the Prefect on the tropical island of Saint Barthélemy.
