= Marcelle Pierrot =

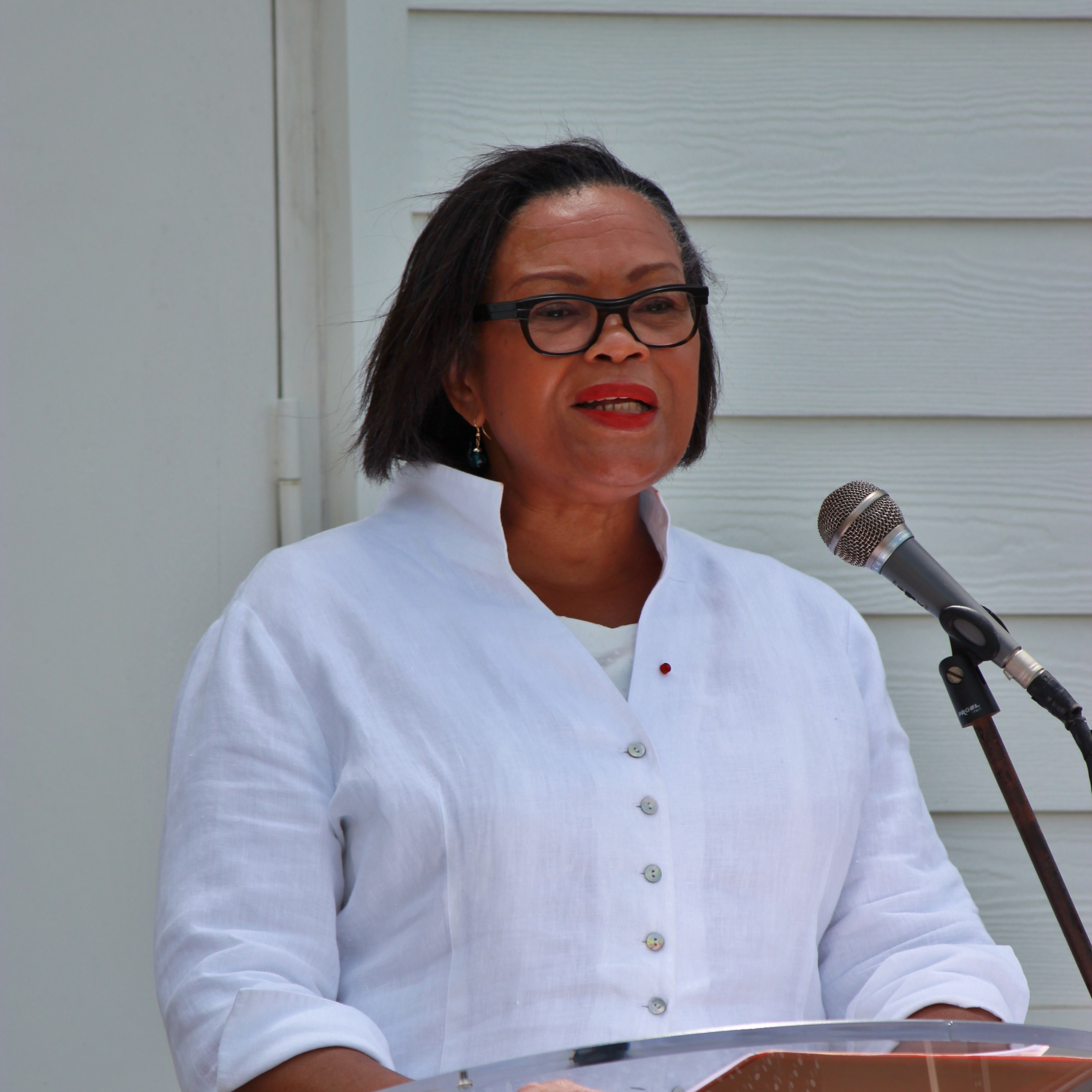
- In 2013

Prefect of Guadeloupe
- In office 2013–2014

Prefect of Vosges
- In office 2011–2013

Prefect of Tarn
- In office 2009–2011

Prefect of Lot
- In office 2007–2009

Personal details
- Born: 20 December 1949 (age 76) Trois-Rivières, Guadeloupe
- Education: Institut d'études politiques de Bordeaux
- Awards: Legion of Honour, National Order of Merit

Marcelle Pierrot (born 20 December 1949) is a retired French politician and stateswoman who worked in regional administration in both metropolitan and overseas France for many years. Most notably, from 23 January 2013 to 21 December 2014 she was prefect of the overseas territory of Guadeloupe and state representative in the territories of Saint-Barthélemy and Saint-Martin.

== Biography ==
A Trois-Rivières native, after attending Lycée Gerville-Réache college in Basse-Terre, Guadeloupe, she studied in political science at the Institut d'études politiques in Bordeaux, where she graduated with a diploma.

Her political career started in 1975, working at the ministry of the interior. She went on to work as a secretary for the administrations of the subprefecture of L'Haÿ-les-Roses, the département of Gers, the former administrative region Limousin and the département of Essonne. Vice-prefect of Lunéville (Meurthe-et-Moselle) from '93 to '95, she returned to the ministry of interior for human ressources. In the following years, she was vice-prefect of Arles (city), Somme (dep.), delegate for equal opportunity of Provence-Alpes-Côte d'Azur (adm.), prefect of Lot (dep.) and prefect of Vosges (dep.).

On 23 January 2013, the French Council of Ministers, named her prefect of Guadeloupe and federal representative in the collectivités of Saint-Barthélemy and Saint-Martin, which was ratified by decree on 24 January 2013.. She is the first woman to hold the office. It is also a first, in the sense that policial officials of that level usually never administer their regions of origin.

She retired on 21 December 2014.

Marcelle Pierrot is featured in the 2012-2013 edition of the "Gotha noir de France," which aims to "highlight role models of talent, excellence, and meritocracy."

== Decorations ==
- Legion of Honour: Knight (chevalière) on 31 December 2001, promoted officer (officière) on 22 April 2011 and commander (commandeure) on 30 December 2016.
- National Order of Merit: Knight (chevalière) on 31 January 1994, promoted officer (officière) on 30 January 2008
