= John Dudley Massingham =

British diplomat

- Born: February 1, 1930
- Died: March 16, 2009
- Title: Commissioner of the Pearce Commission on Rhodesian opinion

John Dudley Massingham CMG (1 February 1930 – 16 March 2009) was a British diplomat. He was Governor of Saint Helena from 1981 to 1984. He later served as British High Commission to Guyana from 1986 to 1987.

Massingham was a commissioner of the Pearce Commission on Rhodesian opinion.
