= Mark Capes =

British diplomat

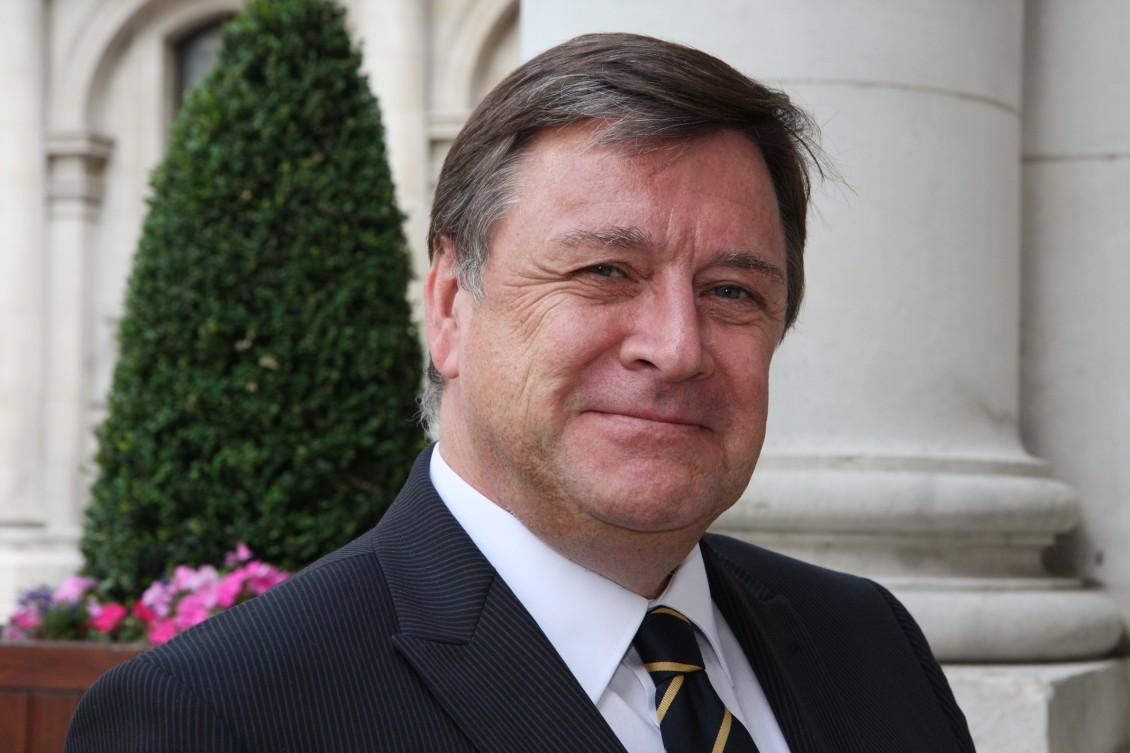

Governor of Saint Helena, Ascension and Tristan da Cunha
- In office October 2011 – 26 April 2016
- Monarch: Elizabeth II
- Preceded by: Andrew Murray Gurr
- Succeeded by: Lisa Phillips Honan

Personal details
- Born: Mark Andrew Capes; 19 February 1954 (age 72) Birkenhead, Cheshire, England

Mark Andrew Capes (born 19 February 1954) is a British diplomat who served as the Governor of Saint Helena, Ascension and Tristan da Cunha from 2011 to 2016. He was replaced by Lisa Phillips. His previous roles have included diplomatic appointments in Austria, Nigeria, Portugal, Jordan, Yugoslavia, the Turks and Caicos Islands and New Zealand, and appointments as deputy governor in Anguilla and Bermuda.

Capes is married to Tamara Capes and has two daughters.
