= Lisa Honan =

British diplomat

Lisa Honan CBE
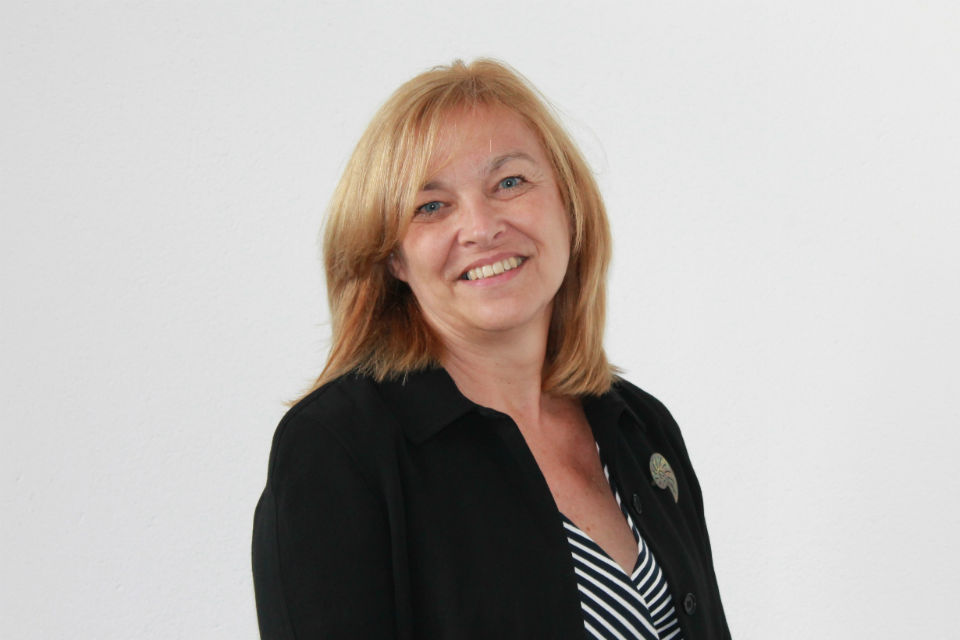

Governor of Saint Helena, Ascension and Tristan da Cunha
- In office 25 April 2016 – 4 May 2019
- Monarch: Elizabeth II
- Preceded by: Mark Andrew Capes
- Succeeded by: Philip Edward Rushbrook

Personal details
- Born: Lisa Kathleen Phillips

Lisa Kathleen Honan (née Phillips) CBE is a British civil servant who was the Governor of Saint Helena, Ascension and Tristan da Cunha from 25 April 2016 until 4 May 2019, when she was replaced by Philip Rushbrook. She is the first female to have held the post.

== Early life and career ==
Honan was previously Head of Office in Kenya for the Department for International Development, and after holding the post in St Helena, went on to be Head of the DFID Office in Nepal from 2019 to 2020. She resigned from there in August 2021, ending a career lasting 46 years in international development. Currently, she is a guide for the city of London, where she offers tours about tea, the East India Company, and saints and sinners.

== Governorship ==
From April 2016 to May 2019 she was Governor of Saint Helena, Ascension and Tristan da Cunha. She stated upon her departure that her big changes were getting funding for fibre-optic cable and opening the SHG-funded hotel. She also stated her wish was to pursue openness in the government, although the Freedom of Information Act and Data Protection Act did not pass during her term. She was seen as trying to improve approachability and opened the Plantation House for more reasons. She was also notable for passing legislation that legalised same-sex marriage in the territory, first in June 2016 with the Ascension Island.

== Honours and awards ==
Lisa Honan was appointed Commander of the Order of the British Empire in the 2016 Queen's Birthday Honours List for services to international aid.

== Personal life ==
On 24 February 2018 she married St. Helena Detective Inspector Dave Honan.
