= Governor of Ascension =

Head of state

- Coat of arms of Ascension

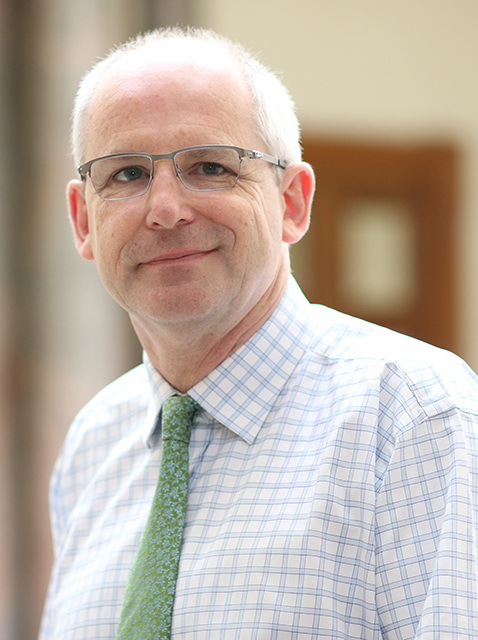
- Incumbent; Nigel Phillips since 13 August 2022
- Style: His Excellency
- Appointer: Monarch of the United Kingdom
- Term length: at His Majesty's pleasure
- Formation: 2009
- First holder: Andrew Gurr

The Governor of Ascension is the representative of the monarch in Ascension Island, a constituent part of the British Overseas Territory of Saint Helena, Ascension and Tristan da Cunha. He is appointed by the monarch on the advice of the British government, his role is to act as the de facto head of state.

Prior to 2009, Ascension Island was a dependency of Saint Helena and therefore directly represented by the Governor of Saint Helena. The St Helena, Ascension and Tristan da Cunha Constitution Order 2009 made Saint Helena, Ascension Island, and Tristan da Cunha, equal constituent parts of the territory with their own governments and established the position of Governor of Ascension.

== Governors from 2009 to present ==
Per section 143 of the Constitution Order, the persons appointed as Governor of Saint Helena are ex officio also Governor of Ascension.

Recent officeholders:

- 2009-2011: Andrew Gurr
- 2011-2016: Mark Andrew Capes
- 2016-2019: Lisa Honan
- 2019-2022: Dr. Philip Rushbrook
- 2022-: Nigel Phillips

== Administrators, from 1964 to present ==
However, as Ascension Island is 809 miles (1,302 km) away from Saint Helena, an administrator is appointed to act as the Governor's representative on the island specifically. This arrangement predates the current constitutional structure and the first administrator was appointed in 1942.

Here is a list of them since 1964, if not 1942, formally referred to as "His / Her Honour".

Administrator	from	until	notes ?
M. E. Wainwright	June 1964	September 1966	
Anthony Grant Ayerst Beyts	September 1966	September 1967	
H. W. D. McDonald	June 1968	September 1973	
Geoffrey Colin Guy († 2006)	September 1973	November 1976	
G. McDonald	November 1976	June 1977	
G. B. Kendal	June 1977	September 1977	
Simon Gillett	September 1977	June 1979	
P. Duncan	June 1979	September 1980	
Bernard Edward Pauncefort († 2010)	September 1980	August 1982	
Ian George Thow	August 1982	August 1984	
Michael T. S. Blick	August 1984	January 1989	
J. J. Beale	January 1989	February 1991	
Brian Norman Connelly	February 1991	June 1995	
Roger C. Huxley	June 1995	23 July 1999	
Geoffrey Fairhurst	23 July 1999	10 July 2002	
Andrew Michael Kettlewell	22 September 2002	September 2005	
Michael Thomas Hill	September 2005	September 2008	
Ross Denny	September 2008	9 September 2011	
Colin Wells	27 October 2011	August 2014	
Marc Holland	26 August 2014	March 2018	
Justine Allan	26 March 2018	25 November 2018	
Steven Chandler	9 March 2019	16 March 2020	
Sean Burns († 2023)	17 March 2020	2 November 2022	
Simon Minshull	2 November 2022	November 2025	
Rowan Laxton	5 November 2025	Incumbent	

== Resident-magistrates, from 1922 to 1964 ==
Resident-magistrate	from	until	Notes
W. Haining	1922	1925	
E. Lee Lander	1925	1928	
Fred Wood	1928	1929	
E. A. Willmott	1929	1934	
Lionel Bartlett	1934	1936	
Percy Edwin Bunker	1936	1938	
C. Nias	1938	1938	
Percy Edwin Bunker	1938	1939	second time
Stephen Harold Cardwell	1939	1944	
Maurice Campbell Clark	1944	1947	
V. W. Oelrichs	1 July 1947	1949	
Herbert Louis Nicholson Ascough	15 July 1949	1951	
F. G. Eastwood	1 February 1951	1952	
B. Stephens	14 April 1952	1954	
A. R. Harrison	1 November 1954	1955	
F. J. Atkins	10 October 1955	1956	
A. R. Harrison	5 March 1956	18 May 1958	second time
B. R. Irving	18 May 1958	4 November 1958	
A. R. Harrison	4 November 1958	30 April 1961	third time
J. R. Bruce	30 April 1961	28 June 1962	
J. Markham	28 June 1962	21 December 1962	
J. R. Bruce	21 December 1962	1964	second time

== Commandants, 1815–1922 ==
Commandant	from	until	Notes
James Kearney White	22 October 1815	March 1816	
William Roberts	March 1816	August 1817	
James Thorn	August 1817	September 1819	
Robert Campbell	September 1819	March 1823	
Edward Nicolls	March 1823	November 1828	First Royal Marines officer as commandant
William Bate	3 November 1828	15 April 1838	Died in office
Hugh Evans	April 1838	January 1839	
Roger Sawrey Tinklar	January 1839	14 September 1840	Died in office
J. Wade	September 1840	December 1840	Acting
W. Lee	December 1840	April 1841	Acting
H. Bennett	April 1841	December 1841	Died in office
W. Lee	December 1841	July 1842	Acting; second time
Thomas Peard Dwyer	July 1842	April 1844	
T. C. C. Moore	April 1844	May 1844	
John Fraser	May 1844	11 October 1844	
Arthur Fleming Morrell	11 October 1844	18 January 1847	
Frederick Hutton	18 January 1847	October 1851	
William Hewgill Kitchen	October 1851	June 1855	
George Alexander Seymour	June 1855	March 1858	
William Farquharson Burnett	March 1858	July 1861	
Frederick Lamport Barnard	July 1861	March 1864	
Joseph Grant Bickford	March 1864	June 1864	
F. Hammond	June 1864	September 1866	
Walter James Hunt-Grubbe	September 1866	March 1867	
Arthur Wilmshurst	March 1867	November 1868	
J. G. Mead	November 1868	May 1869	
R. W. Evans	May 1869	October 1869	
E. F. Kirby	October 1869	October 1872	
John Brazier Creagh	October 1872	January 1874	
James Wylie East	January 1874	February 1877	
Henry Bouchier Phillimore	February 1877	December 1878	
Arthur George Robertson Roe	December 1878	September 1882	
George Parsons	September 1882	October 1886	
Richard Henry Napier	October 1886	June 1890	
Richard Evans	June 1890	May 1893	
J. G. Jones	May 1893	May 1896	
John Edric Blaxland	May 1896	July 1899	
George Northmore Arthur Pollard	July 1899	13 May 1902	
Robert Kyle McAlpine	13 May 1902	13 March 1905	
Reginald Hallward Morgan	13 March 1905	29 April 1908	
J. W. Dunstan	29 April 1908	27 April 1910	
G. Carpenter	27 April 1910	21 April 1913	
Henry Cleeve Bennett	21 April 1913	8 June 1919	
Harold George Grant	8 June 1919	15 October 1920	
Charles Arthur Tennyson	15 October 1920	31 October 1922	
