= Tony Humphries (administrator) =

British politician

Tony Humphries is a former administrator of the British Indian Ocean Territory (BIOT), a British overseas territory in the Indian Ocean. Humphries was an administrator from February 2005 to December 2007.

Government offices
Preceded by Charles A. Hamilton	Administrator of the British Indian Ocean Territory; February 2005 – December 2007	Succeeded by Joanne Yeadon
