= Robert Alford (colonial administrator) =

British colonial administrator

Alford in 1960

Sir Robert Edmund Alford, KBE, CMG (10 September 1904 – 23 November 1979) was a British colonial administrator. He was Governor of St Helena from 1958 to 1962.

Educated at Winchester College and University College, Oxford, Alford joined the Colonial Service and served successively in Nigeria, Zanzibar, and St Helena. He was appointed CMG in 1951 and KBE in 1960.
