= David Morley (diplomat) =

British colonial administrator (born 1954)

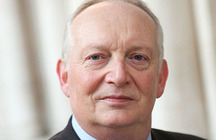
David Morley

David Morley (born 23 October 1954) is a British retired career diplomat. He served as High Commissioner to the Republic of The Gambia from May 2011 until October 2013 when The Gambia left the Commonwealth. He continued as Ambassador to The Gambia until April 2014 when he retired from the Diplomatic Service. He is a former Administrator of Tristan da Cunha. He took up the office on 13 September 2007 having arrived, with his wife Jacki, the previous day. He was the 20th person to serve in the office of administrator. He was replaced on 15 September 2010 by Sean Burns. Prior to his appointment he worked at NATO in Belgium.
