= Governor of Tristan da Cunha =

Head of the government of Saint Helena

- Coat of arms of Tristan da Cunha

- Standard of the governor of Tristan da Cunha

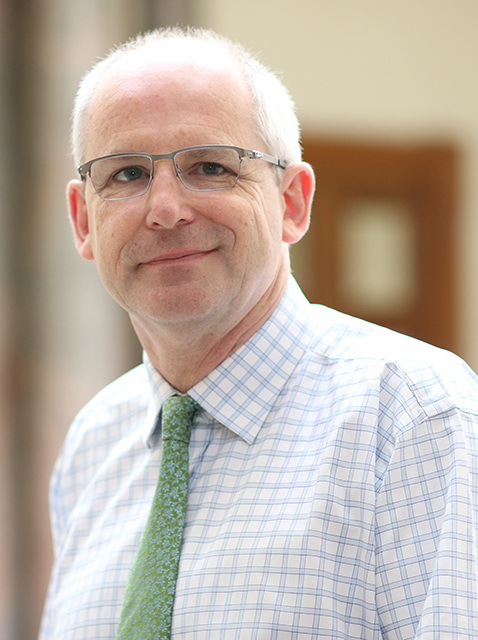
- Incumbent; Nigel Phillips since 13 August 2022
- Style: His Excellency
- Appointer: Monarch of the United Kingdom
- Term length: At His Majesty's pleasure
- Formation: 2009
- First holder: Andrew Gurr

The governor of Tristan da Cunha is the representative of the monarch in Tristan da Cunha, a constituent part of the British Overseas Territory of Saint Helena, Ascension and Tristan da Cunha. The governor is appointed by the monarch on the advice of the British government. The role of the governor is to act as the de facto head of state.

Prior to 2009 Tristan de Cunha was a dependency of Saint Helena and therefore directly represented by the Governor of Saint Helena. The St Helena, Ascension and Tristan da Cunha Constitution Order 2009 made Saint Helena, Ascension Island, and Tristan da Cunha equal constituent parts of the territory with their own governments and established the position of Governor of Tristan da Cunha. Per Section 208 of the Constitution Order the person appointed as Governor of Saint Helena is ex officio Governor of Tristan da Cunha. However, as Tristan da Cunha is 1,350 miles (2,170 km) away from Saint Helena, an administrator of Tristan da Cunha is appointed to act as the governor's representative on the Island. This arrangement predates the current constitutional structure and the first Administrator was appointed in the 1940s. Previously the administrator also acted as the local magistrate, but the appointment is to be transferred to a non-member of the executive or legislative branches of government.

== History ==
The first administrator, appointed during World War II, was Surgeon Lieutenant Commander E. J. S. Woolley, the head of the 16-man British naval garrison on the island which was charged with monitoring German submarines and intercepting their communications.

The first appointee to the post was Sir Hugh Elliott in 1949, when commercial development began of the local crayfish catch, for export markets. There was then no currency on Tristan da Cunha: local trade was by barter. Elliott's activities included the island's first postal service and discovery of a new species of flea, which he named for his wife Elizabeth.

The governor has his own flag, a Union Jack with the addition of the territory's coat of arms in the centre of the flag.

=== List of administrators ===
The following is a complete list of administrators of Tristan da Cunha:

- 1950–1952: Sir Hugh Elliott OBE
- 1952–1954: John Philip Lennox Scott
- 1954–1957: Patrick Richard Forsyth-Thompson
- 1957–1959: Godfrey Francis Harris
- 1959–1961: Peter Andrew Day
- 1961: Peter Wheeler
- 1963–1965: Peter Andrew Day
- 1965–1966: Gordon Henry Whitefield
- 1966–1969: Brian Watkins CMG
- 1969–1974: James Ian Hendry Fleming
- 1974–1975: William Sandham (acting)
- 1975–1978: Sir Stanley Graham Trees MVO OBE
- 1978–1981: Edward Charles Brooks OBE
- 1981–1984: Colin Frank Redston
- 1984–1989: Roger Perry
- 1989–1992: Bernard Edward Pauncefort
- 1992–1994: Philip Hughes Johnson
- 1994–1997: Brendan G. P. Dalley
- 1995–1996: Alan Victor Waters (acting)
- 1997–1998: Brian Walter Money (acting)
- 1998–2001: Brian Paul Baldwin
- 2001–2004: William Andrew Dickson
- 2004–2007: Michael Joseph Hentley
- 2007–2010: David John Morley
- 2010–2013: Sean Gilbert Peter Burns (First time)
- 2013–2016: Richard Alexander John Mitham
- 2016–2020: Sean Gilbert Peter Burns (Second time)
- 2020–2022: Fiona Kilpatrick and Steve Townsend – jointly and served rotationally every 3 months.
- 12 September 2022 – 8 November 2022: Jason Ivory
- 8 November 2022 – 1 December 2022: James Glass (Chief Islander acting as Administrator)
- 1 December 2022 – 16 March 2023: Sean Gilbert Peter Burns (Third time) (died in office)
- 22 March 2023 – 4 July 2023: Lorraine Repetto (Acting)
- 4 July 2023 – 26 September 2023: James Glass (Acting)
- 26 September 2023 – : Philip Kendall

== List of governors ==
Prior to 2009 Tristan da Cunha was a dependency of Saint Helena and therefore directly represented by the governor of Saint Helena.

- 2009 – Andrew Gurr
- 2011 – Mark Andrew Capes
- 2016 – Lisa Honan
- 2019 – Dr Philip Rushbrook
- 2022 – Nigel Phillips
