= Bernard Pauncefort =

British diplomat (1926–2010)

Bernard Pauncefort, OBE (1926–2010) was a British colonial administrator and diplomat who served on two remote South Atlantic islands.

== Life and career ==
Bernard Edward Pauncefort was born on 8 April 1926. He had a distinguished career in colonial administration and diplomacy. He was the Administrator of Ascension Island from 1980 to 1982, a period that included the Falklands War. Ascension was used as a crucial British military base during the conflict.

Following his time on Ascension, Pauncefort served as the Administrator of Tristan da Cunha from 1989 to 1992. His role on Tristan da Cunha was the highest-ranking position on the island. As administrator, he was a representative of the UK government who presided over the Island Council. Pauncefort's service was during the late 1980s and early 1990s, and he received the Order of the British Empire. He died on 14 July 2010.

== Sources ==
- Pauncefort, Bernard, in Who's Who in the United Kingdom
