= Ascension Island Council =

Unicameral legislature of Ascension Island

Type
- Type: Unicameral

Leadership
- Administrator of Ascension Island: Rowan Laxton
- Seats: 8 or 10 (5 or 7 elected, 3 ex-officio)

Elections
- Last election: 3 July 2025

Meeting place
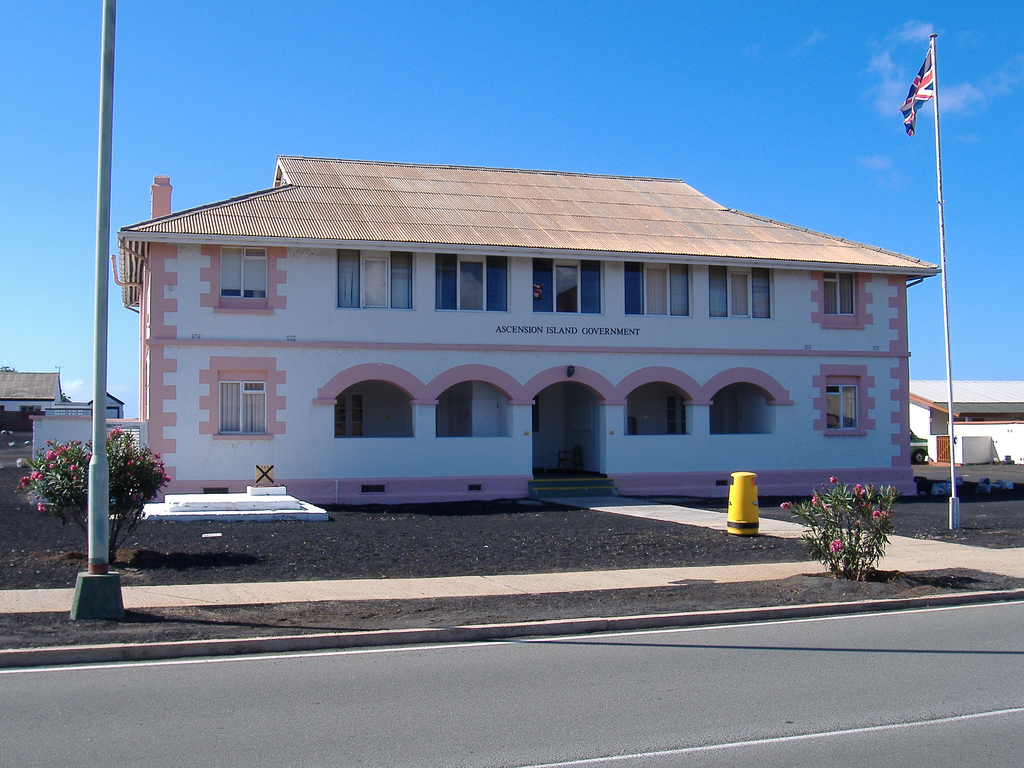
- Government House, Georgetown

Website
- Ascension Island Council

The Ascension Island Council is an elected body that provides advice to the Administrator of Ascension Island on matters relating to the governance of Ascension Island. The Council is made up of either five or seven Councillors, depending on the number of candidates standing for an election, and its meetings are chaired by the Administrator. The Island's constitution requires the Governor and Administrator to consult with the Council when making laws for Ascension Island. The Governor and Administrator are not bound to accept the advice of the Council but the Council has the right of appeal to the British Government.

== Electoral system ==
The five (or seven) seats in the Ascension Island Council are elected for three years terms by first-past-the-post plurality-at-large voting, with voters allowed to cast up to five (or seven) votes respectively. If there is eight or more candidates, the election will be of seven members; if there are six or seven nominations, the election will return a council of five members. If there are fewer than six nominations, the election will be postponed for a period of up to six months, during which time there will be no Island Council.

== Council members ==
The current council consists of five elected members known as councillors, who were elected in September 2019.

Members of the Ascension Island Council:

Andrew Robert Ellick
Keturah (Kitty) Viola George
Alan Herbert Nicholls
Nicholas Ivan John
Douglas Gordon Miller

Following a further by-election on 4 March 2021, councillors Nicholas Ivan John and Douglas Gordon Miller joined the Island Council.

=== Qualifications of councillors ===
Candidates must be 21 years of age, have British Citizenship, British Overseas Territory Citizenship or British Overseas Citizenship, must reside on the island and should have been resident on the island for the 12 months preceding nomination. In practice candidates will typically have been on the island for several years. They must also be on the electoral register for the island.

== History and elections ==
=== First Council ===
The first Ascension Island Council of seven members was elected and took office on 1 November 2002.

=== Second Council ===
This first Council was dissolved by order of the Governor of Saint Helena on 24 October 2005, and a new election was held on 16 November 2005, a total of 697 electors choosing between 10 candidates contesting the seven seats. Six of the seven members resigned in January 2007 in the belief that they were "assisting to legitimise a democracy that doesn’t really exist on Ascension Island". Consequently, a general election was called, but by the close of nominations there were only two candidates. As a result of the boycott, the election was abandoned, and the governor suspended the Island Council for 12 months.

=== Third Council ===
Elections to the third Council were to have taken place in April 2008 but following consultations they were delayed until October 2008. With eight nominations the elections were duly held and seven candidates were elected to form a new Island Council, which was sworn in on 28 October.

=== Fourth Council ===
The third Council was dissolved by the Governor in October 2010 with elections planned for 3 November 2010. By close of nominations on 19 October 2010, six nominations had been received (sufficient for elections to be held for a Council of five elected members), but two of the nominations were submitted late and therefore declared invalid. The Governor was therefore obliged to suspend the Island Government Ordinance and reschedule the elections. On 3 February 2011, it was announced that an election would be held on 25 February. On 28 February 2011, the five new council members were sworn in by the Administrator.

=== Fifth Council ===
General elections were held on 31 October 2013.

=== Sixth Council ===
The general election was held on 1 September 2016 with six candidates running for the five seats of the Island Council.

Candidate	Votes	Notes
Marie-Anne Mabel Dennis	93	Elected
Jacqueline Rose Ellick	80	Re-elected (Note: Ellick was first elected in a by-election on 18 November 2014 and was officially sworn in on 15 January 2015)
Keturah Viola George	76	Re-elected
Nicholas Ivan John	68	Re-elected
Samantha Jean Arms-Lawrence	55	Re-elected
Katie Jean Downes	36	
Total	121	
Registered voters/turnout	...	23%
Source: Government of Ascension Island

=== Seventh Council ===
On 26 September 2019 a general election of the Island Council was held. This followed the dissolution of the previous Council on 1 September 2019, in accordance with the Island Government (Ascension) Ordinance 2008.

Seven candidates ran for five available Councillor positions, with electors being permitted to cast up to five votes each. Of 518 registered electors 150 electors cast 498 votes, casting their ballots as follows:

Candidate	Total number of votes cast	Percentage (rounded to nearest whole figure)	Notes
Katharyn Sarah Chadwick	73	15%	Elected
Andrew Robert Ellick	68	14%	Elected
Keturah Viola George (Kitty)	105	21%	Re-elected
Kristopher Edward Hall	60	12%	
Andrew Cansfield Hobson	64	13%	Elected
Iain Courtney Lamb	45	9%	
Alan Herbert Nicholls	83	17%	Re-elected
Total	498		
Registered voters/turnout		29%	
Source: Government of Ascension Island

The Council met formally for the first time at 12:15 on 27 September where Councillors were formally sworn in.

=== Seventh Council By-Election ===
On 4 March 2021 a By-Election of the Island Council was held following the departure of two Councillors earlier in 2020.

Three candidates ran for two available Councillor positions, with electors being permitted to cast up to two votes each. Of 550 registered electors 108 electors cast 181 votes, casting their ballots as follows:

Candidate	Total number of votes cast	Percentage (rounded to nearest whole figure)	Notes
Nicholas Ivan John	72	40%	Elected
Douglas Gordon Miller	69	38%	Elected
Lucy Rodwell	40	22%	
Total	181		
Registered voters/turnout		20%	
Source: Government of Ascension Island

The Council met formally for the first time at 16:30 on 11 March 2021 where Councillors were formally sworn in.

== See also ==
- Legislative Council of Saint Helena
- Tristan da Cunha Island Council
