= Michael Clancy =

Governor and Commander-in-Chief of Saint Helena and its Dependencies

Michael John Clancy

Governor of Saint Helena, Ascension and Tristan da Cunha
- In office 15 October 2004 – 28 October 2007
- Preceded by: David Leslie Smallman
- Succeeded by: Martin Hallam (Acting), Andrew Gurr
- Born: 31 March 1949
- Died: 23 February 2010 (aged 60)
- Education: Lewis School, Pengam; Trinity College, Cambridge
- Spouse: Claire Clancy

Michael John Clancy (31 March 1949 – 23 February 2010) was Chief Secretary from 1997 to 2000, and later Governor and Commander-in-Chief of Saint Helena and its Dependencies (Ascension Island and Tristan da Cunha) from 2004 to 2007. He was educated at Lewis School, Pengam and Trinity College, Cambridge.

He was married to Claire Clancy who was the Chief Executive of the National Assembly for Wales between 2007 and 2017.

== Death ==
Michael Clancy died from cancer at the age of 60.
