= Nigel Phillips =

Governor of Saint Helena, Ascension, and Tristan da Cunha

His Excellency Air Commodore Nigel Phillips CBE
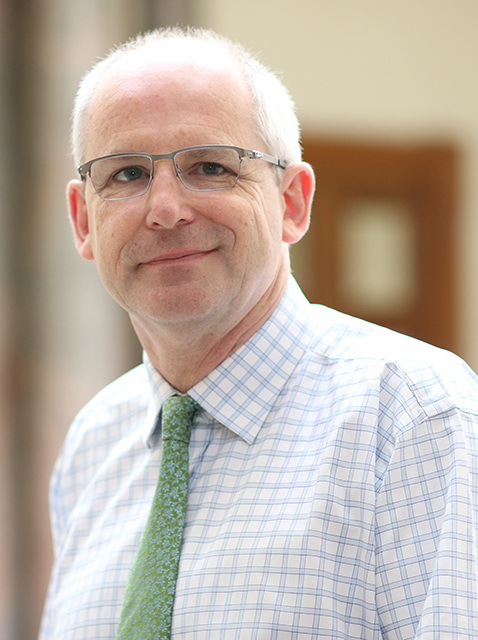
- Phillips in 2017

Governor of Saint Helena, Ascension and Tristan da Cunha
- Incumbent
- Assumed office 13 August 2022
- Monarchs: Elizabeth II; Charles III
- Chief Minister: Julie Thomas; Rebecca Cairns-Wicks
- Preceded by: Philip Rushbrook

Governor of the Falkland Islands Commissioner for South Georgia and the South Sandwich Islands
- In office 12 September 2017 – 1 July 2022
- Monarch: Elizabeth II
- Chief Executive: Barry Rowland; Andy Keeling
- Preceded by: Colin Roberts
- Succeeded by: Alison Blake

Personal details
- Born: 10 May 1963 (age 63)
- Spouse: Emma Phillips
- Children: Kyrie Phillips
- Education: Durham University; King's College London

Military service
- Allegiance: United Kingdom
- Branch/service: Royal Air Force
- Years of service: 1984-2017
- Rank: Air Commodore

Air Commodore Nigel James Phillips, CBE (born 10 May 1963) is a British diplomat, former Royal Air Force officer and former Governor of the Falkland Islands and Commissioner of the South Georgia and the South Sandwich Islands. He has served as Governor of Saint Helena, Ascension and Tristan da Cunha since 13 August 2022.

== Career ==
Phillips joined the Royal Air Force in 1984 and went on to serve in various appointments, rising to the rank of Air Commodore. From 1993 to 1997, he attended Durham University, graduating as a Master of Business Administration and in 2001 he gained a master's in Defence Studies, Military, political and international issues from King's College London, where he was awarded a Cormorant Fellowship. He went on to join the Defence Communication Services Agency as a Senior Staff Officer. Then in 2003 he was assigned to the British Embassy in Stockholm as the Defence Attaché.

In 2007 Phillips left Stockholm to become the Deputy Commandant and Garrison Commander at the Defence College of Communications and Information Systems. Two years later, in 2009, Phillips was assigned to the British Embassy in Warsaw, again as the Defence Attaché. Also in 2009, he was given the Master of Signals Award by the Royal Signals Institute.

Phillips undertook Russian language training at the Defence Academy in 2012 and in 2014 he was appointed Head of Russian Strategic Studies and Wider Europe Policy at the Ministry of Defence. He was appointed Commander of the Order of the British Empire by Queen Elizabeth II in the 2013 Birthday Honours and in 2016 Phillips became the Deputy Military Representative to Her Majesty's Permanent Representative to the European Union in Brussels, under the Ministry of Defence.

In June 2017 the Foreign and Commonwealth Office announced that Phillips had been appointed the new Governor of the Falkland Islands and Commissioner for South Georgia and the South Sandwich Islands, succeeding Colin Roberts on 12 September 2017.

In April 2022 the Foreign, Commonwealth and Development Office announced his appointment as Governor of Saint Helena, Ascension and Tristan da Cunha.

== Honours ==

Ribbon	Description	Notes
	Order of the British Empire (CBE)	Commander; Military Division; 2013 Birthday Honours
	Queen Elizabeth II Golden Jubilee Medal	2002; UK version of this medal
	Queen Elizabeth II Diamond Jubilee Medal	2012; UK version of this medal
	Royal Air Force Long Service and Good Conduct Medal	with 1 clasp
