= St Helena, Ascension and Tristan da Cunha Constitution Order 2009 =

- Statutory Instrument
- Parliament of the United Kingdom
- Citation: SI 2009/1751
- Territorial extent: United Kingdom; St Helena, Ascension and Tristan da Cunha

Dates
- Made: 8 July 2009
- Laid before Parliament: 15 July 2009
- Commencement: 1 September 2009; 16 years ago

Other legislation
- Repeals/revokes: St Helena Constitution Order 1988
- Made under: Saint Helena Act 1833; British Settlements Act 1887; British Settlements Act 1945

Status: Current legislation

Text of the St Helena, Ascension and Tristan da Cunha Constitution Order 2009 as in force today (including any amendments) within the United Kingdom, from legislation.gov.uk.

The St Helena, Ascension and Tristan da Cunha Constitution Order 2009 (SI 2009/1751) is a statutory instrument of the Parliament of the United Kingdom direct from the Privy Council of the United Kingdom that made legal provision for a new Constitution for the British Overseas Territory of St Helena, Ascension and Tristan da Cunha.

Before the constitution came into force, the territory was formally known as St Helena and Dependencies under the provisions of the St. Helena Constitution Order 1988 (SI 1988/1842), which the 2009 order replaces. The new constitution gave each of the main islands equal status, ending the status of Ascension Island and Tristan da Cunha as dependencies of Saint Helena within the territory. However, it retains a single governor who is based in Jamestown, a single legal system and administrators for Ascension and Tristan da Cunha. It came into force on 1 September 2009.

== See also ==
- Politics of Saint Helena, Ascension and Tristan da Cunha
