= Governor of Saint Helena =

Representative of the monarch in Saint Helena

- Coat of arms of Saint Helena

- Standard of the Governor of Saint Helena

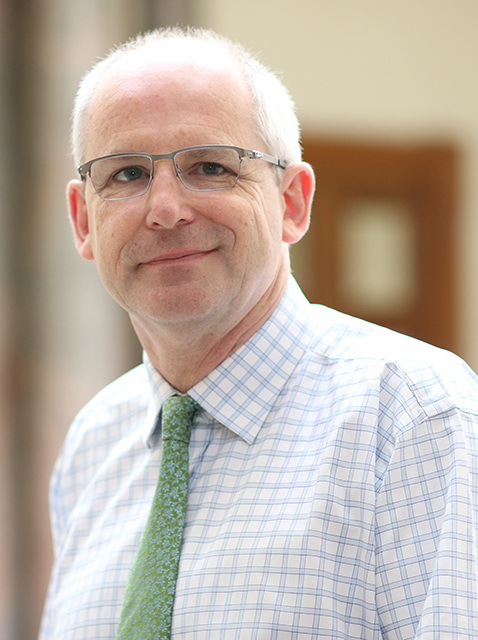
- Incumbent; Nigel Phillips since 13 August 2022
- Style: His Excellency
- Residence: Plantation House, St Helena
- Appointer: Monarch of the United Kingdom
- Term length: At His Majesty's pleasure
- Formation: 1659
- First holder: John Dutton
- Website: Government of St Helena

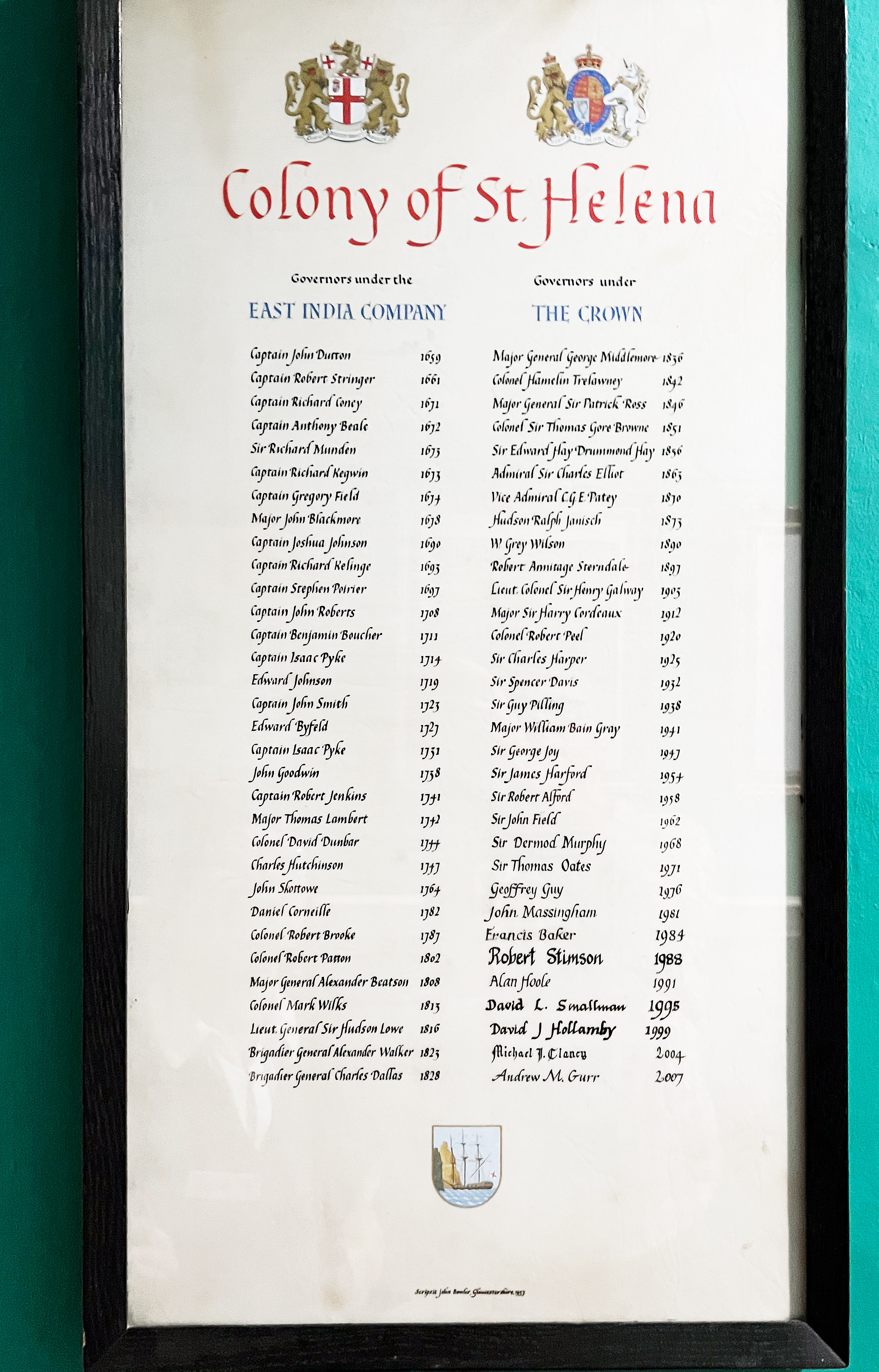
A calligraphic list of St. Helena's governors from 1659 to 2007 hangs on an interior wall of Plantation house.

The Governor of Saint Helena is the representative of the monarch in Saint Helena, a constituent part of the British Overseas Territory of Saint Helena, Ascension and Tristan da Cunha. The governor is appointed by the monarch on the advice of the British government. The current governor of Saint Helena has been Nigel Phillips since 13 August 2022.

The role of the governor is to act as the de facto head of state and commander-in-chief of Saint Helena. The governor's responsibilities include internal security, external affairs, the administration of justice, finance, shipping and employment, as well as disciplinary action in respect of any public officer. The governor appoints the Chief Minister of Saint Helena and four other members of the Executive Council; the officeholder, with some exceptions, is bound to seek and act in accordance with their advice.

The governor is based on Saint Helena and appointed by the British Foreign, Commonwealth and Development Office. The governor also appoints three members to Saint Helena's Executive Council (the balance being popularly elected)

The governor's flag in Saint Helena is the Union Flag defaced with the territory's coat of arms. The official residence, Plantation House, is located near the capital Jamestown. The Governor's Office is located within The Castle, along with the office of the chief secretary of Saint Helena, who runs the day-to-day administrative part of the government.

Prior to 2009, Ascension and Tristan da Cunha were dependencies of Saint Helena and therefore directly represented by the Governor of Saint Helena. The St Helena, Ascension and Tristan da Cunha Constitution Order 2009 made Saint Helena, Ascension, and Tristan da Cunha equal constituent parts of the territory. Each constituent part has its own government; however, the constitution order states that the Governor of Saint Helena is ex officio also the Governor of Ascension and the Governor of Tristan da Cunha.

== Acting governor and the governor's deputy ==
Under the St Helena, Ascension and Tristan da Cunha Constitution Order 2009, an acting governor is appointed when the office of governor is vacant or the governor is unable to fulfill his or her duties long term. The acting governor is appointed by the King.

If the governor is off the island for a short time (including visits to Ascension or Tristan da Cunha) or is ill for a short period, the governor may appoint anyone on St Helena to be deputy. The deputy must follow any instructions issued by the governor. It is current practice to appoint an acting governor when the governor is away from the island of Saint Helena, even if visiting either Ascension Island or Tristan da Cunha.

In recent years the chief secretary (or the attorney general) has taken on this temporary role in the governor's absence, the most recent times being in January 2011 when the governor travelled to Tristan da Cunha and the chief secretary became deputy governor and then later in 2011 when Kenneth Baddon, the attorney general, became deputy governor.

== List of governors of Saint Helena ==
=== East India Company governors ===
The territory was governed by the East India Company from its initial colonization in 1659 to the end of company rule in 1834.

- Capt. John Dutton 1659–1660
- Capt. Robert Stringer 1660–1669
- Capt. Richard Coney 1669–1672
- Capt. Anthony Beal 1672–73
- Dutch East India Company interregnum – January to May 1673
- Capt. Richard Keigwin 1673–1674 (interim)
- Capt. Gregory Field 1674–1678
- Maj. John Blackmore 1678–1690
- Capt. Joshua Johnson 1690–1693 – assassinated, whilst Governor, on the island
- Capt. Richard Keling 1693–1697
- Capt. Stephen Poirier 1697–1707
- Capt. John Roberts 1708–1711
- Capt. Benjamin Boucher 1711–1713
- Capt. Isaac Pike 1713–1718
- Edward Johnson 1718–1722
- Capt. John Smith 1722–1726
- Edward Byfield 1727–1731
- Capt. Isaac Pyke - 1731–1738
- John Goodwin - 1738–1741
- Capt. Robert Jenkins - 1741–1742
- Maj. Thomas Lambert - 1742–1744
- Col. David Dunbar - 1744-1746
- Capt. Charles Hutchinson 1746–1764
- John Skottowe - 1764–1782
- Daniel Corneille - 1782–1787
- Sir Robert Brooke 1788–1800
- Francis Robson 13 Jul 1801 – 11 Mar 1802, Acting Governor and East India Company officer
- Colonel Robert Patton Mar 1802 – July 1807
- Colonel William Lane July 1807 - July 1808
- Beatson July 1808 - 1813
- Mark Wilks 1813–1816
- Major-General Sir Hudson Lowe 1816–1821
- John Pine Coffin 1821–1823
- Brigadier General Alexander Walker 1823–1828
- Charles Dallas 1828–1834

=== British Crown governors ===
Following on from St Helena becoming a crown colony in 1834, the first governor was appointed in 1836.

- 1836 – Major General George Middlemore
- 1842 – Colonel Hamelin Trelawny
- 1846 – Major General Sir Patrick Ross
- 1851 – Colonel Sir Thomas Gore Browne
- 1856 – Sir Edward Drummond-Hay
- 1863 – Admiral Sir Charles Elliot
- 1870 – Vice Admiral Charles George Edward Patey
- 1873 – Hudson Ralph Janisch
- 1884 – Lieutenant-Colonel Grant Blunt, RE (acting)
- 1887 – William Grey-Wilson (acting)
- 1889 – R. L. Antrobus (acting)
- 1890 – William Grey-Wilson
- 1897 – Robert Armitage Sterndale
- 1902 – Lieutenant-Colonel Sir Henry Galway
- 1912 – Major Sir Harry Cordeaux
- 1920 – Colonel Robert Peel
- 1925 – Lieutenant-Colonel Harold Iremonger (Acting Governor)
- 1925 – Sir Charles Harper
- 1932 – Sir Spencer Davis
- 1938 – Sir Guy Pilling
- 1941 – Major William Bain Gray
- 1947 – Sir George Joy
- 1954 – Sir James Harford
- 1958 – George Albert Lewis (Acting Governor)
- 1960 – Sir Robert Alford
- 1963 – Sir John Field
- 1969 – Sir Dermod Murphy
- 1971 – Sir Thomas Oates
- 1976 – Geoffrey Colin Guy
- 1981 – John Dudley Massingham
- 1984 – Francis Eustace Baker
- 1988 – Robert F. Stimson
- 1991 – Alan Hoole
- 1995 – David Leslie Smallman
- 1996 - Brian Walter Money
- 1999 – David Hollamby
- 2004 – Michael Clancy
- 2004 – Martin Hallam (Acting Governor)
- 2007 – Andrew Gurr
- 2011 - Andrew Wells (Acting Governor)
- 2011 – Kevin Baddon (Acting Governor)
- 2011 – Mark Andrew Capes
- 2016 – Lisa Honan
- 2019 – Louise MacMorran (Acting Governor)
- 2019 – Dr Philip Rushbrook
- 2022 – Greg Gibson (Acting Governor)
- 2022 – Nigel Phillips

== See also ==
- Administrator of Ascension Island
- Administrator of Tristan da Cunha
