= Susan O'Bey =

Politician in Saint Helena

Susan O'Bey is a politician in Saint Helena. She is currently chief secretary, one of the most senior roles in the island's government.

O'Bey, who is from the remote British Overseas Territory, began her career working in education, including as a school headmistress, before becoming a public servant.

It was first announced that she would become chief secretary in May 2017. She was temporarily sworn in as acting chief secretary in September 2017 while then-Chief Secretary Roy Burke was on leave.

O'Bey was officially sworn in as chief secretary by the governor of Saint Helena in April 2018, replacing Burke, whose contract on the island had ended. Then-Gov. Lisa Phillips described her as the "first substantive St. Helenian chief secretary."

In her capacity as chief secretary, she served as a non-voting member of the island's Executive Council. Since 2021, after the island's governance system referendum, the chief secretary is no longer on the council and Julie Thomas has taken office as the country's inaugural chief minister.

O'Bey previously served as Saint Helena's director of strategic policy and planning, then as deputy chief executive for economic development for the island's Enterprise Saint Helena program.

She holds a master's in public policy and management from the University of York.
