= List of female constituent and dependent territory leaders =

This is a list of women who had been appointed as leaders of constituent states and dependent territories. This list also separates between the dependent territory leaders and the autonomous area leaders.

== Female chief executives of a constituent country or state ==
Incumbent
- Italics denotes an acting chief executive

=== Female heads of government of a constituent country or federated state ===
Name	Portrait	Administrative division	Office	Mandate start	Mandate end	Term length	Country
Yevgenia Bosch		Ukrainian PRS (Note: One of Soviet puppet states that existed on the territory of Ukraine during Ukrainian–Soviet War. Declared independence from the Russian Soviet Republic on 25 December 1917.)	Chairwoman of the People's Secretariat	30 December 1917	1 March 1918	61 days	Russian SFSR
Nellie Ross		Wyoming	Governor	5 January 1925	3 January 1927	1 year, 363 days	United States
Miriam A. Ferguson		Texas	Governor	20 January 1925	17 January 1927	1 year, 362 days	United States
Miriam A. Ferguson		Texas	Governor	17 January 1933	15 January 1935	1 year, 363 days	United States
Kalima Amankulova		Kyrgyz SSR	Acting chairwoman of the Supreme Soviet; Acting head of state	15 May 1938	18 July 1938	64 days	Soviet Union
Nadezhda Grekova		Byelorussian SSR	Chairwoman of the Supreme Soviet; Head of state	25 July 1938	12 March 1949	10 years, 230 days	Soviet Union
Louise Schroeder		Berlin	Acting Mayor (under Allied supervision)	11 June 1947	14 August 1948	1 year, 64 days	Germany
Louise Schroeder		Berlin	Acting Mayor (under Allied supervision)	1 December 1948	7 December 1948	6 days	Germany
Sucheta Kripalani		Uttar Pradesh	Chief Minister	2 October 1963	13 March 1967	3 years, 162 days	India
Lurleen Wallace		Alabama	Governor	16 January 1967	7 May 1968 (died in office)	1 year, 112 days	United States
Savka Dabčević-Kučar		SR Croatia	Chairwoman of the Executive Council (prime minister)	11 May 1967	8 May 1969	1 year, 362 days	SFR Yugoslavia
Nandini Satpathy		Odisha	Chief Minister	14 June 1972	16 December 1976	4 years, 185 days	India
Shashikala Kakodkar		Goa	Chief Minister	12 August 1973	27 April 1979	5 years, 258 days	India
Ella T. Grasso		Connecticut	Governor	8 January 1975	31 December 1980	5 years, 358 days	United States
Dixy Lee Ray		Washington	Governor	12 January 1977	14 January 1981	4 years, 2 days	United States
Griselda Álvarez		Colima	Governor	1 November 1979	31 October 1985	5 years, 364 days	Mexico
Anwara Taimur		Assam	Chief Minister	6 December 1980	30 June 1981	206 days	India
Anna Nenna D'Antonio		Abruzzo	President	30 November 1981	13 May 1983	1 year, 164 days	Italy
Martha Layne Collins		Kentucky	Governor	13 December 1983	8 December 1987	3 years, 360 days	United States
Maria Liberia Peters		Netherlands Antilles	Prime Minister	18 September 1984	1 January 1986	1 year, 105 days	Netherlands
Maria Liberia Peters		Netherlands Antilles	Prime Minister	17 May 1988	25 November 1993	5 years, 192 days	Netherlands
Madeleine Kunin		Vermont	Governor	10 January 1985	10 January 1991	6 years, 0 days	United States
Iolanda Fleming		Acre	Governor	14 May 1986	15 March 1987	305 days	Brazil
Kay A. Orr		Nebraska	Governor	9 January 1987	9 January 1991	4 years, 0 days	United States
Beatriz Paredes Rangel		Tlaxcala	Governor	15 January 1987	11 April 1992	5 years, 87 days	Mexico
V. N. Janaki Ramachandran		Tamil Nadu	Chief Minister	7 January 1988	30 January 1988	23 days	India
Rose Mofford		Arizona	Governor	4 April 1988	6 March 1991	2 years, 336 days	United States
Ingrid Pankraz		East Berlin	Acting Mayor	15 February 1990	23 February 1990	8 days	East Germany
Joan Kirner		Victoria	Premier	10 August 1990	6 October 1992	2 years, 57 days	Australia
Carmen Lawrence		Western Australia	Premier	12 February 1990	16 February 1993	3 years, 4 days	Australia
Sharon Pratt Kelly		District of Columbia	Mayor	2 January 1991	2 January 1995	4 years, 0 days	United States
Joan Finney		Kansas	Governor	14 January 1991	9 January 1995	3 years, 360 days	United States
Barbara Roberts		Oregon	Governor	14 January 1991	9 January 1995	3 years, 360 days	United States
Ann Richards		Texas	Governor	15 January 1991	17 January 1995	4 years, 2 days	United States
Dulce María Sauri Riancho		Yucatán	Governor	14 February 1991	1 December 1993	2 years, 290 days	Mexico
Rita Johnston		British Columbia	Premier	2 April 1991	5 November 1991	217 days	Canada
J. Jayalalithaa		Tamil Nadu	Chief Minister	24 June 1991	12 May 1996	4 years, 323 days	India
J. Jayalalithaa		Tamil Nadu	Chief Minister	14 May 2001	21 September 2001	130 days	India
J. Jayalalithaa		Tamil Nadu	Chief Minister	2 March 2002	12 May 2006	4 years, 71 days	India
J. Jayalalithaa		Tamil Nadu	Chief Minister	16 May 2011	27 September 2014	3 years, 134 days	India
J. Jayalalithaa		Tamil Nadu	Chief Minister	23 May 2015	5 December 2016 (died in office)	1 year, 196 days	India
Fiorella Ghilardotti		Lombardia	President	12 December 1992	3 June 1994	1 year, 173 days	Italy
Catherine Callbeck		Prince Edward Island	Premier	25 January 1993	9 October 1996	3 years, 258 days	Canada
María Antonia Martínez		Murcia	President	2 May 1993	3 July 1995	2 years, 62 days	Spain
Laurette Onkelinx		French Community	Minister-President	6 May 1993	13 July 1999	6 years, 68 days	Belgium
Heide Simonis		Schleswig-Holstein	Minister-President	19 May 1993	27 April 2005	11 years, 343 days	Germany
Suzanne Camelia-Römer		Netherlands Antilles	Prime Minister	25 November 1993	28 December 1993	33 days	Netherlands
Suzanne Camelia-Römer		Netherlands Antilles	Prime Minister	14 May 1998	8 November 1999	1 year, 178 days	Netherlands
Christine Todd Whitman		New Jersey	Governor	18 January 1994	31 January 2001	7 years, 13 days	United States
Alessandra Guerra		Friuli-Venezia Giulia	President	18 July 1994	7 November 1995	1 year, 112 days	Italy
Roseana Sarney		Maranhão	Governor	1 January 1995	5 April 2002	7 years, 94 days	Brazil
Roseana Sarney		Maranhão	Governor	17 April 2009	10 December 2014	5 years, 237 days	Brazil
Mayawati		Uttar Pradesh	Chief Minister	13 June 1995	18 October 1995	127 days	India
Mayawati		Uttar Pradesh	Chief Minister	21 March 1997	21 September 1997	184 days	India
Mayawati		Uttar Pradesh	Chief Minister	3 May 2002	29 August 2003	1 year, 118 days	India
Mayawati		Uttar Pradesh	Chief Minister	13 May 2007	15 March 2012	4 years, 307 days	India
Waltraud Klasnic		Styria	Governor	23 January 1996	25 October 2005	9 years, 275 days	Austria
Biljana Plavšić		Republika Srpska	President	19 July 1996	14 November 1998	2 years, 118 days	Bosnia and Herzegovina
Valentina Bronevich		Koryakia	Administrator	17 November 1996	3 December 2000	4 years, 16 days	Russia
Rajinder Kaur Bhattal		Punjab	Chief Minister	21 November 1996	12 February 1997	83 days	India
Jeanne Shaheen		New Hampshire	Governor	9 January 1997	9 January 2003	6 years, 0 days	United States
Rabri Devi		Bihar	Chief Minister	25 July 1997	11 February 1999	1 year, 201 days	India
Rabri Devi		Bihar	Chief Minister	9 March 1999	2 March 2000	359 days	India
Rabri Devi		Bihar	Chief Minister	11 March 2000	6 March 2005	4 years, 360 days	India
Jane Dee Hull		Arizona	Governor	5 September 1997	6 January 2003	5 years, 123 days	United States
Sushma Swaraj		National Capital Territory of Delhi	Chief Minister	12 October 1998	3 December 1998	52 days	India
Sheila Dikshit		National Capital Territory of Delhi	Chief Minister	3 December 1998	28 December 2013	15 years, 25 days	India
Nancy Hollister		Ohio	Governor	31 December 1998	11 January 1999	11 days	United States
Margherita Cogo		Trentino-Alto Adige	President	11 March 1999	14 March 2002	3 years, 3 days	Italy
Irene Sáez		Nueva Esparta	Governor	20 April 1999	8 June 2000	1 year, 49 days	Venezuela
Rosario Robles		Mexico City	Head of government	29 September 1999	4 December 2000	1 year, 66 days	Mexico
Maria Rita Lorenzetti		Umbria	President	15 May 2000	16 April 2010	9 years, 335 days	Italy
Judy Martz		Montana	Governor	1 January 2001	3 January 2005	4 years, 2 days	United States
Ruth Ann Minner		Delaware	Governor	3 January 2001	20 January 2009	8 years, 17 days	United States
Jane Swift		Massachusetts	Governor	10 April 2001	2 January 2003	1 year, 267 days	United States
Alicia Lemme		San Luis	Governor	23 December 2001	10 December 2003	1 year, 352 days	Argentina
Dalva Figueiredo		Amapá	Governor	5 April 2002	1 January 2003	271 days	Brazil
Benedita da Silva		Rio de Janeiro	Governor	6 April 2002	1 January 2003	270 days	Brazil
Linda Lingle		Hawaii	Governor	2 December 2002	6 December 2010	8 years, 4 days	United States
Mercedes Aragonés de Juárez		Santiago del Estero	Governor	12 December 2002	1 April 2004	1 year, 111 days	Argentina
Nataša Mićić		Serbia	Acting President	29 December 2002	27 January 2004	1 year, 29 days	FR Yugoslavia/ Serbia and Montenegro
Jennifer Granholm		Michigan	Governor	1 January 2003	1 January 2011	8 years, 0 days	United States
Rosângela Garotinho		Rio de Janeiro	Governor	1 January 2003	1 January 2007	4 years, 0 days	Brazil
Wilma de Faria		Rio Grande do Norte	Governor	1 January 2003	31 March 2010	7 years, 89 days	Brazil
Janet Napolitano		Arizona	Governor	6 January 2003	21 January 2009	6 years, 15 days	United States
Kathleen Sebelius		Kansas	Governor	13 January 2003	28 April 2009	6 years, 105 days	United States
Mirna Louisa-Godett		Netherlands Antilles	Prime Minister	11 August 2003	3 June 2004	297 days	Netherlands
Valentina Matviyenko		Saint Petersburg	Governor	15 October 2003	22 August 2011	7 years, 311 days	Russia
Olene Walker		Utah	Governor	5 November 2003	3 January 2005	1 year, 59 days	United States
Esperanza Aguirre		Community of Madrid	President	20 November 2003	17 September 2012	8 years, 302 days	Spain
Uma Bharti		Madhya Pradesh	Chief Minister	8 December 2003	23 August 2004	259 days	India
Vasundhara Raje		Rajasthan	Chief Minister	8 December 2003	18 December 2008	5 years, 10 days	India
Vasundhara Raje		Rajasthan	Chief Minister	8 December 2013	17 December 2018	5 years, 9 days	India
Kathleen Blanco		Louisiana	Governor	12 January 2004	14 January 2008	4 years, 2 days	United States
Gabi Burgstaller		Salzburg	Governor	28 April 2004	19 June 2013	9 years, 52 days	Austria
Jodi Rell		Connecticut	Governor	1 July 2004	5 January 2011	6 years, 188 days	United States
Marie Arena		French Community	Minister-President	19 July 2004	20 March 2008	3 years, 245 days	Belgium
Amalia García		Zacatecas	Governor	12 September 2004	11 September 2010	5 years, 364 days	Mexico
Maria Bolshakova		Ulyanovsk Oblast	Acting Governor	22 November 2004	6 January 2005	45 days	Russia
Christine Gregoire		Washington	Governor	12 January 2005	16 January 2013	8 years, 4 days	United States
Mercedes Bresso		Piemonte	President	27 April 2005	9 April 2010	4 years, 344 days	Italy
Emily de Jongh-Elhage		Netherlands Antilles	Prime Minister	26 March 2006	10 October 2010	4 years, 198 days	Netherlands
Maria de Lourdes Abadia		Brazilian Federal District	Governor	31 March 2006	1 January 2007	276 days	Brazil
Sarah Palin		Alaska	Governor	4 December 2006	26 July 2009	2 years, 143 days	United States
Ana Julia Carepa		Pará	Governor	1 January 2007	1 January 2011	4 years, 0 days	Brazil
Yeda Crusius		Rio Grande do Sul	Governor	1 January 2007	1 January 2011	4 years, 0 days	Brazil
Borjana Krišto		Federation of Bosnia and Herzegovina	President	22 February 2007	17 March 2011	4 years, 23 days	Bosnia and Herzegovina
Ivonne Ortega Pacheco		Yucatán	Governor	1 August 2007	30 September 2012	5 years, 60 days	Mexico
Anna Bligh		Queensland	Premier	13 September 2007	26 March 2012	4 years, 195 days	Australia
Fabiana Ríos		Tierra del Fuego	Governor	10 December 2007	10 December 2015	8 years, 0 days	Argentina
Stella Lugo		Falcón	Governor	23 November 2008	15 October 2017	8 years, 326 days	Venezuela
Bev Perdue		North Carolina	Governor	10 January 2009	5 January 2013	3 years, 361 days	United States
Jan Brewer		Arizona	Governor	21 January 2009	5 January 2015	5 years, 349 days	United States
Christine Lieberknecht		Thuringia	Minister-President	30 October 2009	5 December 2014	5 years, 36 days	Germany
Kristina Keneally		New South Wales	Premier	4 December 2009	28 March 2011	1 year, 145 days	Australia
Arlene Foster		Northern Ireland	Acting First Minister	11 January 2010	3 February 2010	23 days	United Kingdom
Arlene Foster		Northern Ireland	Acting First Minister	10 September 2015	20 October 2015	40 days	United Kingdom
Arlene Foster		Northern Ireland	First Minister	11 January 2016	9 January 2017	364 days	United Kingdom
Arlene Foster		Northern Ireland	First Minister	11 January 2020	14 June 2021	1 year, 154 days	United Kingdom
Natalya Komarova		Khanty-Mansi Autonomous Okrug	Governor	1 March 2010	30 May 2024	14 years, 90 days	Russia
Catiuscia Marini		Umbria	President	16 April 2010	28 May 2019	9 years, 42 days	Italy
Renata Polverini		Lazio	President	16 April 2010	12 March 2013	2 years, 330 days	Italy
Hannelore Kraft		North Rhine-Westphalia	Minister-President	14 July 2010	27 June 2017	6 years, 348 days	Germany
Sarah Wescot-Williams		Sint Maarten	Prime Minister	10 October 2010	19 December 2014	4 years, 70 days	Netherlands
Kathy Dunderdale		Newfoundland and Labrador	Premier	3 December 2010	24 January 2014	3 years, 52 days	Canada
Susana Martinez		New Mexico	Governor	1 January 2011	1 January 2019	8 years, 0 days	United States
Rosalba Ciarlini		Rio Grande do Norte	Governor	1 January 2011	1 January 2015	4 years, 0 days	Brazil
Mary Fallin		Oklahoma	Governor	10 January 2011	14 January 2019	8 years, 4 days	United States
Nikki Haley		South Carolina	Governor	12 January 2011	24 January 2017	6 years, 12 days	United States
Lara Giddings		Tasmania	Premier	24 January 2011	31 March 2014	3 years, 66 days	Australia
Christy Clark		British Columbia	Premier	14 March 2011	18 July 2017	6 years, 126 days	Canada
Mamata Banerjee		West Bengal	Chief Minister	20 May 2011	8 May 2026	14 years, 353 days	India
María Dolores de Cospedal		Castile-La Mancha	President	22 June 2011	1 July 2015	4 years, 9 days	Spain
Yolanda Barcina		Navarre	President	23 June 2011	20 July 2015	4 years, 27 days	Spain
Luisa Fernanda Rudi Ubeda		Aragon	President	13 July 2011	3 July 2015	3 years, 355 days	Spain
Paula Sánchez de León		Valencian Community	Acting President	20 July 2011	28 July 2011	8 days	Spain
Annegret Kramp-Karrenbauer		Saarland	Minister-President	10 August 2011	28 February 2018	6 years, 202 days	Germany
Alison Redford		Alberta	Premier	7 October 2011	23 March 2014	2 years, 167 days	Canada
Lucía Corpacci		Catamarca	Governor	10 December 2011	10 December 2019	8 years, 0 days	Argentina
Marina Kovtun		Murmansk Oblast	Governor	4 April 2012	21 March 2019	6 years, 351 days	Russia
Adriana D'Elia		Miranda	Governor	6 June 2012	15 January 2013	223 days	Venezuela
Pauline Marois		Quebec	Premier	19 September 2012	23 April 2014	1 year, 216 days	Canada
Erika Farías		Cojedes	Governor	28 December 2012	30 September 2016	3 years, 277 days	Venezuela
Maggie Hassan		New Hampshire	Governor	3 January 2013	2 January 2017	3 years, 365 days	United States
Malu Dreyer		Rhineland-Palatinate	Minister-President	16 January 2013	10 July 2024	11 years, 176 days	Germany
Kathleen Wynne		Ontario	Premier	11 February 2013	29 June 2018	5 years, 138 days	Canada
Željka Cvijanović		Republika Srpska	Prime Minister	12 March 2013	19 November 2018	5 years, 252 days	Bosnia and Herzegovina
Željka Cvijanović		Republika Srpska	President	19 November 2018	15 November 2022	3 years, 361 days	Bosnia and Herzegovina
Svetlana Orlova		Vladimir Oblast	Governor	24 March 2013	8 October 2018	5 years, 198 days	Russia
Aleqa Hammond		Greenland	Prime Minister	5 April 2013	30 September 2014	1 year, 178 days	Denmark
Debora Serracchiani		Friuli-Venezia Giulia	President	25 April 2013	26 March 2018	4 years, 336 days	Italy
Susana Díaz		Andalusia	President	5 September 2013	18 January 2019	5 years, 135 days	Spain
Claudia Ledesma Abdala		Santiago del Estero	Governor	10 December 2013	10 December 2017	4 years, 0 days	Argentina
Anandiben Patel		Gujarat	Chief Minister	22 May 2014	7 August 2016	2 years, 77 days	India
Nicola Sturgeon		Scotland	First Minister	20 November 2014	28 March 2023	8 years, 128 days	United Kingdom
Suely Campos		Roraima	Governor	1 January 2015	10 December 2018	3 years, 343 days	Brazil
Muriel Bowser		District of Columbia	Mayor	2 January 2015	Incumbent	11 years, 318 days	United States
Gina Raimondo		Rhode Island	Governor	6 January 2015	2 March 2021	6 years, 55 days	United States
Annastacia Palaszczuk		Queensland	Premier	14 February 2015	15 December 2023	8 years, 304 days	Australia
Kate Brown		Oregon	Governor	18 February 2015	9 January 2023	7 years, 325 days	United States
Rachel Notley		Alberta	Premier	24 May 2015	30 April 2019	3 years, 341 days	Canada
Cristina Cifuentes		Community of Madrid	President	24 June 2015	25 April 2018	2 years, 305 days	Spain
Francina Armengol		Balearic Islands	President	30 June 2015	20 June 2023	7 years, 355 days	Spain
Uxue Barkos		Navarre	President	20 July 2015	6 August 2019	4 years, 17 days	Spain
Claudia Pavlovich Arellano		Sonora	Governor	13 September 2015	12 September 2021	5 years, 364 days	Mexico
María Eugenia Vidal		Buenos Aires Province	Governor	10 December 2015	10 December 2019	4 years, 0 days	Argentina
Alicia Kirchner		Santa Cruz	Governor	10 December 2015	10 December 2023	8 years, 0 days	Argentina
Rosana Bertone		Tierra del Fuego	Governor	10 December 2015	17 December 2019	4 years, 7 days	Argentina
Natalia Zhdanova		Zabaykalsky Krai	Governor	18 February 2016	25 October 2018	2 years, 249 days	Russia
Mehbooba Mufti		Jammu and Kashmir	Chief Minister	4 April 2016	20 June 2018	2 years, 77 days	India
Caryl Bertho		Aragua	Governor	5 January 2017	15 October 2017	283 days	Venezuela
Gladys Berejiklian		New South Wales	Premier	23 January 2017	5 October 2021	4 years, 255 days	Australia
María Dolores Pagán		Murcia	Acting President	4 April 2017	3 May 2017	29 days	Spain
Kay Ivey		Alabama	Governor	10 April 2017	Incumbent	9 years, 220 days	United States
Johanna Mikl-Leitner		Lower Austria	Governor	19 April 2017	Incumbent	9 years, 211 days	Austria
Kim Reynolds		Iowa	Governor	24 May 2017	Incumbent	9 years, 176 days	United States
Manuela Schwesig		Mecklenburg-Vorpommern	Minister-President	4 July 2017	Incumbent	9 years, 135 days	Germany
Carmen Meléndez		Lara	Governor	16 October 2017	25 October 2020	3 years, 9 days	Venezuela
Laidy Gómez		Táchira	Governor	23 October 2017	4 December 2021	4 years, 42 days	Venezuela
Soraya Sáenz de Santamaría		Catalonia	President (Direct rule)	27 October 2017	1 June 2018	217 days	Spain
Evelyn Wever-Croes		Aruba	Prime Minister	17 November 2017	28 March 2025	7 years, 131 days	Netherlands
Leona Marlin-Romeo		Sint Maarten	Prime Minister	15 January 2018	10 October 2019	1 year, 268 days	Netherlands
Katharina Fegebank		Hamburg	Acting First Mayor	13 March 2018	28 March 2018	15 days	Germany
Ilse Aigner		Bavaria	Acting Minister-President	14 March 2018	16 March 2018	2 days	Germany
Cida Borghetti		Paraná	Governor	6 April 2018	1 January 2019	270 days	Brazil
Nicoletta Spelgatti		Valle d'Aosta	President	27 June 2018	10 December 2018	166 days	Italy
Vera Shcherbina		Sakhalin Oblast	Acting Governor	26 September 2018	7 December 2018	72 days	Russia
Srebrenka Golić		Republika Srpska	Acting Prime Minister	19 November 2018	18 December 2018	29 days	Bosnia and Herzegovina
Claudia Sheinbaum		Mexico City	Head of government	5 December 2018	16 June 2023	4 years, 193 days	Mexico
Martha Érika Alonso		Puebla	Governor	14 December 2018	24 December 2018 (died in office)	10 days	Mexico
Gretchen Whitmer		Michigan	Governor	1 January 2019	Incumbent	7 years, 319 days	United States
Michelle Lujan Grisham		New Mexico	Governor	1 January 2019	Incumbent	7 years, 319 days	United States
Fátima Bezerra		Rio Grande do Norte	Governor	1 January 2019	Incumbent	7 years, 319 days	Brazil
Janet Mills		Maine	Governor	2 January 2019	Incumbent	7 years, 318 days	United States
Kristi Noem		South Dakota	Governor	5 January 2019	25 January 2025	6 years, 20 days	United States
Laura Kelly		Kansas	Governor	14 January 2019	Incumbent	7 years, 306 days	United States
Liesbeth Homans		Flanders	Minister-President	2 July 2019	1 October 2019	91 days	Belgium
María Chivite		Navarre	President	6 August 2019	Incumbent	7 years, 102 days	Spain
Isabel Díaz Ayuso		Community of Madrid	President	14 August 2019	Incumbent	7 years, 94 days	Spain
Concha Andreu		La Rioja	President	29 August 2019	29 June 2023	3 years, 304 days	Spain
Donatella Tesei		Umbria	President	11 November 2019	2 December 2024	5 years, 21 days	Italy
Silveria Jacobs		Sint Maarten	Prime Minister	19 November 2019	3 May 2024	4 years, 166 days	Netherlands
Arabela Carreras		Río Negro	Governor	10 December 2019	10 December 2023	4 years, 0 days	Argentina
Michelle O'Neill		Northern Ireland	Deputy First Minister	11 January 2020	4 February 2022	2 years, 24 days	United Kingdom
Michelle O'Neill		Northern Ireland	First Minister	3 February 2024	Incumbent	2 years, 286 days	United Kingdom
Olga Antipina		Perm Krai	Acting Governor	21 January 2020	6 February 2020	16 days	Russia
Jole Santelli		Calabria	President	15 February 2020	15 October 2020 (died in office)	243 days	Italy
Astalaxmi Shakya		Bagmati Province	Chief Minister	18 August 2021	27 October 2021	70 days	Nepal
Kathy Hochul		New York	Governor	24 August 2021	Incumbent	5 years, 84 days	United States
Lorena Cuéllar Cisneros		Tlaxcala	Governor	31 August 2021	Incumbent	5 years, 77 days	Mexico
María Eugenia Campos Galván		Chihuahua	Governor	8 September 2021	Incumbent	5 years, 69 days	Mexico
Layda Sansores		Campeche	Governor	15 September 2021	Incumbent	5 years, 62 days	Mexico
Evelyn Salgado Pineda		Guerrero	Governor	15 October 2021	Incumbent	5 years, 32 days	Mexico
Marina del Pilar Ávila Olmeda		Baja California	Governor	1 November 2021	Incumbent	5 years, 15 days	Mexico
Indira Vizcaíno Silva		Colima	Governor	1 November 2021	Incumbent	5 years, 15 days	Mexico
Heather Stefanson		Manitoba	Premier	2 November 2021	18 October 2023	1 year, 350 days	Canada
Franziska Giffey		Berlin	Governing Mayor	21 December 2021	27 April 2023	1 year, 127 days	Germany
Regina Sousa		Piauí	Governor	31 March 2022	31 December 2022	275 days	Brazil
Izolda Cela		Ceará	Governor	2 April 2022	31 December 2022	273 days	Brazil
Anke Rehlinger		Saarland	Minister-President	25 April 2022	Incumbent	4 years, 205 days	Germany
Mara Lezama Espinosa		Quintana Roo	Governor	25 September 2022	Incumbent	4 years, 52 days	Mexico
María Teresa Jiménez Esquivel		Aguascalientes	Governor	1 October 2022	Incumbent	4 years, 46 days	Mexico
Danielle Smith		Alberta	Premier	11 October 2022	Incumbent	4 years, 36 days	Canada
Raquel Lyra		Pernambuco	Governor	1 January 2023	Incumbent	3 years, 319 days	Brazil
Katie Hobbs		Arizona	Governor	2 January 2023	Incumbent	3 years, 318 days	United States
Maura Healey		Massachusetts	Governor	5 January 2023	Incumbent	3 years, 315 days	United States
Celina Leão		Federal District	Interim Governor	8 January 2023	15 March 2023	66 days	Brazil
Celina Leão		Federal District	Governor	30 March 2026	Incumbent	231 days	Brazil
Tina Kotek		Oregon	Governor	9 January 2023	Incumbent	3 years, 311 days	United States
Sarah Huckabee Sanders		Arkansas	Governor	10 January 2023	Incumbent	3 years, 310 days	United States
Lidija Bradara		Federation of Bosnia and Herzegovina	President	28 February 2023	Incumbent	3 years, 261 days	Bosnia and Herzegovina
Mae de la Concha		Balearic Islands	President	19 June 2023	7 July 2023	18 days	Spain
Marga Prohens		Balearic Islands	President	7 July 2023	Incumbent	3 years, 132 days	Spain
Jacinta Allan		Victoria	Premier	7 September 2023	28 July 2026	2 years, 324 days	Australia
Delfina Gómez Álvarez		State of Mexico	Governor	16 September 2023	Incumbent	3 years, 61 days	Mexico
Emma Little-Pengelly		Northern Ireland	Deputy First Minister	3 February 2024	Incumbent	2 years, 286 days	United Kingdom
Maryam Nawaz		Punjab	Chief Minister	26 February 2024	Incumbent	2 years, 263 days	Pakistan
Alessandra Todde		Sardinia	President	20 March 2024	Incumbent	2 years, 241 days	Italy
María Dolores Fritz Sierra		Yucatán	Acting Governor	7 May 2024	3 June 2024	27 days	Mexico
María Dolores Fritz Sierra		Yucatán	Acting Governor	29 August 2024	30 September 2024	32 days	Mexico
Eluned Morgan		Wales	First Minister	6 August 2024	12 May 2026	1 year, 279 days	United Kingdom
Atishi		National Capital Territory of Delhi	Chief Minister	21 September 2024	20 February 2025	152 days	India
Libia García Muñoz Ledo		Guanajuato	Governor	26 September 2024	Incumbent	2 years, 51 days	Mexico
Margarita González Saravia		Morelos	Governor	1 October 2024	Incumbent	2 years, 46 days	Mexico
Clara Brugada		Mexico City	Mayor	5 October 2024	Incumbent	2 years, 42 days	Mexico
Rocío Nahle		Veracruz	Governor	1 December 2024	Incumbent	1 year, 350 days	Mexico
Susan Holt		New Brunswick	Premier	2 November 2024	Incumbent	2 years, 14 days	Canada
Maria Kostyuk		Jewish Autonomous Oblast	Governor	5 November 2024 (acting until 23 September 2025)	Incumbent	2 years, 11 days	Russia
Stefania Proietti		Umbria	President	2 December 2024	Incumbent	1 year, 349 days	Italy
Bethany Hall-Long		Delaware	Governor	7 January 2025	21 January 2025	14 days	United States
Kelly Ayotte		New Hampshire	Governor	9 January 2025	Incumbent	1 year, 311 days	United States
Rekha Gupta		National Capital Territory of Delhi	Chief Minister	20 February 2025	Incumbent	1 year, 269 days	India
Irina Gecht		Nenets Autonomous Okrug	Governor	18 March 2025	Incumbent	1 year, 243 days	Russia
Marina Podtikhova		Tver Oblast	Acting Governor	29 September 2025	5 November 2025	37 days	Russia
Abigail Spanberger		Virginia	Governor	17 January 2026	Incumbent	303 days	United States
Mikie Sherrill		New Jersey	Governor	20 January 2026	Incumbent	300 days	United States
Hana Ghassan		Pará	Governor	2 April 2026	Incumbent	228 days	Brazil
Mailza Gomes		Acre	Governor	2 April 2026	Incumbent	228 days	Brazil
Christine Fréchette		Quebec	Premier	15 April 2026	21 October 2026	189 days	Canada
Yeraldine Bonilla Valverde		Sinaloa	Acting Governor	2 May 2026	21 August 2026	111 days	Mexico
Olga Abramova		Udmurtia	Acting Head of the Republic	29 July 2026	Incumbent	110 days	Russia
Graciela Dominguez Nava		Sinaloa	Governor	25 August 2026	Incumbent	83 days	Mexico
Jocelyn Benson		Michigan	Governor	1 January 2027	Elect	−46 days	United States
Deb Haaland		New Mexico	Governor	1 January 2027	Elect	−46 days	United States
Janeese Lewis George		District of Columbia	Mayor	2 January 2027	Elect	−47 days	United States
Helena Foulkes		Rhode Island	Governor	4 January 2027	Elect	−49 days	United States
Amy Klobuchar		Minnesota	Governor	4 January 2027	Elect	−49 days	United States
Hannah Pingree		Maine	Governor	6 January 2027	Elect	−51 days	United States
Amy Acton		Ohio	Governor	11 January 2027	Elect	−56 days	United States
Cindy Holscher		Kansas	Governor	11 January 2027	Elect	−56 days	United States
Keisha Lance Bottoms		Georgia	Governor	11 January 2027	Elect	−56 days	United States
Marsha Blackburn		Tennessee	Governor	16 January 2027	Elect	−61 days	United States
Gina Hinojosa		Texas	Governor	19 January 2027	Elect	−64 days	United States

=== Female viceregal or central government representatives in a constituent country ===
Name	Portrait	Country	Office	Mandate start	Mandate end	Term length	Parent country
Vibeke Larsen (Note: Not to be confused with Vibeke Larsen, Norwegian Sámi politician.)		Faroe Islands	High Commissioner	30 June 1996	1 November 2001	5 years, 124 days	Denmark
Mo Mowlam		Northern Ireland	Secretary of State	3 May 1997	11 October 1999	2 years, 161 days	United Kingdom
Helen Liddell		Scotland	Secretary of State	25 January 2001	13 June 2003	2 years, 139 days	United Kingdom
Birgit Kleis		Faroe Islands	High Commissioner	1 November 2001	1 August 2005	3 years, 273 days	Denmark
Cheryl Gillan		Wales	Secretary of State	12 May 2010	4 September 2012	2 years, 115 days	United Kingdom
Mikaela Engell		Greenland	High Commissioner	1 April 2011	30 April 2022	11 years, 29 days	Denmark
Theresa Villiers		Northern Ireland	Secretary of State	4 September 2012	14 July 2016	3 years, 314 days	United Kingdom
Adèle van der Pluijm-Vrede		Curaçao	Acting Governor	24 November 2012	4 November 2013	345 days	Netherlands
Lucille George-Wout		Curaçao	Governor	4 November 2013	4 November 2025	12 years, 0 days	Netherlands
Lene Moyell Johansen		Faroe Islands	High Commissioner	15 May 2017	Incumbent	9 years, 185 days	Denmark
Karen Bradley		Northern Ireland	Secretary of State	8 January 2018	24 July 2019	1 year, 197 days	United Kingdom
Julie Præst Wilche		Greenland	High Commissioner	1 May 2022	Incumbent	4 years, 199 days	Denmark
Jo Stevens		Wales	Secretary of State	5 July 2024	20 July 2026	2 years, 15 days	United Kingdom

== Dependent, autonomous and insular territories ==
Denotes incumbent head of territory/government
- Italics denotes an acting head of territories and territories that are defunct.

Name	Image	Territory	Office	Mandate start	Mandate end	Term length	Parent country
Susanne le Pelley		Sark	Dame of Sark	1730	1733	3 years, 0 days	Great Britain
Marie Collings		Sark	Dame of Sark	1852	1853	1 year, 0 days	United Kingdom
Sibyl Hathaway		Sark	Dame of Sark	20 June 1927	14 July 1974	47 years, 24 days	United Kingdom
Sakina Aliyeva		Nakhichevan ASSR	Chair of the Presidium of the Supreme Soviet	9 February 1963	9 April 1990	27 years, 59 days	Soviet Union
Carolyn Stuart		Cocos (Keeling) Islands	Administrator	20 November 1985	? December 1987	2 years, 11 days	Australia
Stella Sigcau		Transkei	Prime Minister	5 October 1987	30 December 1987	86 days	South Africa
Dawn Lawrie		Cocos (Keeling) Islands	Administrator	8 November 1988	27 November 1990	2 years, 19 days	Australia
Rosemary Follett		Australian Capital Territory	Chief Minister	11 May 1989	5 December 1989	208 days	Australia
Catherine Tizard		Ross Dependency	Governor-General	13 December 1990	21 March 1996	5 years, 99 days	New Zealand
Nellie Cournoyea		Northwest Territories	Premier	14 November 1991	22 November 1995	4 years, 8 days	Canada
Marita Petersen		Faroe Islands	Prime Minister	18 January 1993	15 September 1994	1 year, 240 days	Denmark
Anson Chan		Hong Kong	Chief Secretary	29 November 1993	30 June 1997	3 years, 213 days	United Kingdom
Anson Chan		Hong Kong	Chief Secretary for Administration	1 July 1997	30 April 2001	3 years, 303 days	China
Ann-Kristin Olsen		(Norway) Svalbard	Governor	1995	1998	3 years, 0 days	Norway
Åshild Hauan		(Norway) Jan Mayen	Administrator	1 January 1995	1 October 2007	12 years, 273 days	Norway
Kate Carnell		Australian Capital Territory	Chief Minister	2 March 1995	18 October 2000	5 years, 230 days	Australia
Pamela F. Gordon		Bermuda	Premier	27 March 1997	10 November 1998	1 year, 228 days	United Kingdom
Brigitte Girardin		French Southern and Antarctic Lands	Prefect and Superior Administrator	25 March 1998	25 May 2000	2 years, 92 days	France
Brigitte Girardin		Clipperton Island	Administrator	7 May 2002	2 June 2005	3 years, 26 days	France
Jennifer M. Smith		Bermuda	Premier	10 November 1998	29 July 2003	4 years, 261 days	United Kingdom
Florinda Chan		Macau	Secretary for Administration and Justice	20 December 1999	20 December 2014	15 years, 0 days	China
Pat Duncan		Yukon	Premier	6 May 2000	30 November 2002	2 years, 208 days	Canada
Sila María Calderón		Puerto Rico	Governor	2 January 2001	2 January 2005	4 years, 0 days	United States
Sian Elias		Ross Dependency	Acting Governor-General	22 March 2001	4 April 2001	13 days	New Zealand
Sian Elias		Ross Dependency	Acting Governor-General	4 August 2006	23 August 2006	19 days	New Zealand
Sian Elias		Ross Dependency	Acting Governor-General	23 August 2011	31 August 2011	8 days	New Zealand
Sian Elias		Ross Dependency	Acting Governor-General	31 August 2016	28 September 2016	28 days	New Zealand
Silvia Cartwright		Ross Dependency	Governor-General	4 April 2001	4 August 2006	5 years, 122 days	New Zealand
Clare Martin		Northern Territory	Chief Minister	18 August 2001	26 November 2007	6 years, 100 days	Australia
Cynthia Astwood		Turks and Caicos Islands	Acting Governor	26 November 2002	16 December 2002	20 days	United Kingdom
Deborah Barnes Jones		Montserrat	Governor	10 May 2004	6 July 2007	3 years, 57 days	United Kingdom
Marie-Noëlle Thémereau		New Caledonia	President of the Government	10 June 2004	7 August 2007	3 years, 58 days	France
Brenda Christian		Pitcairn Islands	Acting Mayor	8 November 2004	15 December 2004	37 days	United Kingdom
Mahala Wynns		Turks and Caicos Islands	Acting Governor	21 June 2005	11 July 2005	20 days	United Kingdom
Anne Boquet		French Polynesia	High Commissioner of the Republic	10 September 2005	29 June 2008	2 years, 293 days	France
Harriet Hall		South Georgia and the South Sandwich Islands	Acting Commissioner	2006	2006	?	United Kingdom
Kjerstin Askholt		(Norway) Bouvet Island	Administrator	2006	2 October 2015	9 years, 274 days	Norway
Kjerstin Askholt		(Norway) Peter I Island	Administrator	2006	2 October 2015	9 years, 274 days	Norway
Kjerstin Askholt		(Norway) Queen Maud Land	Administrator	2006	2 October 2015	9 years, 274 days	Norway
Jane Rumble		British Antarctic Territory	Administrator	2006	2008	2 years, 0 days	United Kingdom
Melania Hotu		Easter Island	Governor	11 March 2006	18 March 2010	4 years, 7 days	Chile
Dancia Penn		British Virgin Islands	Acting Governor	10 April 2006	18 April 2006	8 days	United Kingdom
Joanne Yeadon		British Indian Ocean Territory	Administrator	2007	2011	4 years, 0 days	United Kingdom
Michèle Alliot-Marie		Clipperton Island	Administrator	19 June 2007	23 June 2009	2 years, 4 days	France
Viveka Eriksson		Åland Islands	Chief Minister	26 November 2007	25 November 2011	3 years, 364 days	Finland
Eva Aariak		Nunavut	Premier	19 November 2008	19 November 2013	5 years, 0 days	Canada
Doreen Quelch-Missick		Turks and Caicos Islands	Member of the Advisory Council	14 August 2009	13 November 2012	3 years, 91 days	United Kingdom
Edith Cox		Turks and Caicos Islands	Member of the Advisory Council	18 August 2009	13 November 2012	3 years, 87 days	United Kingdom
Lesley Pallet		Gibraltar	Acting Governor	21 October 2009	26 October 2009	5 days	United Kingdom
Hill-Marta Solberg		(Norway) Jan Mayen	Administrator	1 November 2009	1 December 2018	9 years, 30 days	Norway
Marie-Luce Penchard		Clipperton Island	Administrator	6 November 2009	10 May 2012	2 years, 186 days	France
Victoria Treadell		Pitcairn Islands	Governor	29 May 2010	25 August 2014	4 years, 88 days	United Kingdom
V. Inez Archibald		British Virgin Islands	Acting Governor	7 August 2010	20 August 2010	13 days	United Kingdom
Carmen Cardinali Paoa		Easter Island	Governor	8 September 2010	11 March 2014	3 years, 184 days	Chile
Paula Cox		Bermuda	Premier	29 October 2010	18 December 2012	2 years, 69 days	United Kingdom
Sarita Francis		Montserrat	Acting Governor	3 March 2011	8 April 2011	36 days	United Kingdom
Josette Manin		Martinique	President of the General Council	31 March 2011	18 December 2015	4 years, 262 days	France
Katy Gallagher		Australian Capital Territory	Chief Minister	16 May 2011	11 December 2014	3 years, 209 days	Australia
Camilla Gunell		Åland Islands	Chief Minister	25 November 2011	25 November 2015	4 years, 0 days	Finland
Carrie Lam		Hong Kong	Chief Secretary for Administration	1 July 2012	16 January 2017	4 years, 199 days	China
Carrie Lam		Hong Kong	Chief Executive	1 July 2017	30 June 2022	4 years, 364 days	China
Marcelle Pierrot		Guadeloupe	Prefect	23 January 2013	21 December 2014	1 year, 332 days	France
Lydia Emerencia		Bonaire	Lieutenant Governor	1 March 2012	1 March 2014	2 years, 0 days	Netherlands
Juliana O'Connor-Connolly		Cayman Islands	Premier	19 December 2012	29 May 2013	161 days	United Kingdom
Juliana O'Connor-Connolly		Cayman Islands	Premier	15 November 2023	6 May 2025	1 year, 172 days	United Kingdom
Christina Scott		Anguilla	Governor	23 July 2013	17 August 2017	4 years, 25 days	United Kingdom
María Isabel Salvador		Galápagos Islands	Chair of the Governing Council	1 August 2013	29 April 2015	1 year, 271 days	Ecuador
Helen Kilpatrick		Cayman Islands	Governor	6 September 2013	5 March 2018	4 years, 180 days	United Kingdom
Anya Williams		Turks and Caicos Islands	Acting Governor	15 September 2013	4 October 2013	19 days	United Kingdom
Alison MacMillan		Gibraltar	Acting Governor	13 November 2013	6 December 2013	23 days	United Kingdom
Marta Hotus Tuki		Easter Island	Governor	11 March 2014	9 September 2015	1 year, 182 days	Chile
George Pau-Langevin		Clipperton Island	Administrator	2 April 2014	30 August 2016	2 years, 150 days	France
Cynthia Ligeard		New Caledonia	President of the Government	5 June 2014	1 April 2015	300 days	France
Esther Kiaʻāina		(United States) Wake Island	Administrator	11 July 2014	20 January 2017	2 years, 193 days	United States
V. Inez Archibald		British Virgin Islands	Acting Governor	1 August 2014	15 August 2014	14 days	United Kingdom
Cécile Pozzo di Borgo		French Southern and Antarctic Lands	Prefect and Superior Administrator	18 September 2014	30 October 2018	4 years, 42 days	France
Sonia Chan		Macau	Secretary for Administration and Justice	20 December 2014	20 December 2019	5 years, 0 days	China
Irina Vlah		Gagauzia	Governor	23 March 2015	19 July 2023	8 years, 118 days	Moldova
Anne Laubies		Saint Barthélemy	Prefect Delegated	8 June 2015	9 July 2018	3 years, 31 days	France
Anne Laubies		Saint-Martin	Prefect Delegated	8 June 2015	9 July 2018	3 years, 31 days	France
Elizabeth Carriere		Montserrat	Governor	5 August 2015	2 January 2018	2 years, 150 days	United Kingdom
Melania Carolina Hotu Hey		Easter Island	Governor	9 September 2015	11 March 2018	2 years, 183 days	Chile
Alison MacMillan		Gibraltar	Acting Governor	28 September 2015	19 January 2016	113 days	United Kingdom
Kjerstin Askholt		(Norway) Svalbard	Governor	1 October 2015	24 June 2021	5 years, 266 days	Norway
Katrin Sjögren		Åland Islands	Chief Minister	25 November 2015	25 November 2019	4 years, 0 days	Finland
Linda Te Puni		Tokelau	Acting Administrator	1 March 2016	1 March 2017	1 year, 0 days	New Zealand
Sonja Stewart		Lord Howe Island	Chair of the Island Board	March 2016	15 July 2019	3 years, 136 days	Australia
Lisa Honan		Saint Helena, Ascension and Tristan da Cunha	Governor	25 April 2016	4 May 2019	3 years, 8 days	United Kingdom
Ginny Ferson		Bermuda	Acting Governor	2 August 2016	5 December 2016	125 days	United Kingdom
Ericka Bareigts		Clipperton Island	Administrator	30 August 2016	10 May 2017	253 days	France
Patsy Reddy		Ross Dependency	Governor-General	28 September 2016	28 September 2021	5 years, 0 days	New Zealand
Sharlene Cartwright-Robinson		Turks and Caicos Islands	Premier	20 December 2016	21 February 2021	4 years, 63 days	United Kingdom
Annick Girardin		Clipperton Island	Administrator	17 May 2017	6 July 2020	3 years, 50 days	France
Lorena Tapia Núñez		Galápagos Islands	Chair of the Governing Council	1 June 2017	14 January 2019	1 year, 227 days	Ecuador
Marjorie Morton		Nevis	Acting Deputy Governor-General	1 September 2017	31 August 2018	364 days	Saint Kitts and Nevis
Natasha Griggs		Christmas Island	Administrator	5 October 2017	4 October 2022	4 years, 364 days	Australia
Natasha Griggs		Cocos (Keeling) Islands	Administrator	5 October 2017	4 October 2022	4 years, 364 days	Australia
Lyndell Simpson		Montserrat	Acting Governor	2 January 2018	1 February 2018	30 days	United Kingdom
Laura Clarke		Pitcairn Islands	Governor	25 January 2018	7 July 2022	4 years, 165 days	United Kingdom
Laura Alarcón Rapu		Easter Island	Governor	11 March 2018	29 April 2021	3 years, 49 days	Chile
Justine Allan		Ascension Island	Administrator	26 March 2018	25 November 2018	244 days	United Kingdom
Nicoletta Spelgatti		Aosta Valley	President	27 June 2018	10 December 2018	166 days	Italy
Sylvie Feucher		Saint Barthélemy	Prefect Delegated	9 July 2018	14 December 2020	2 years, 158 days	France
Sylvie Feucher		Saint-Martin	Prefect Delegated	9 July 2018	14 December 2020	2 years, 158 days	France
Hyleta Liburd		Nevis	Deputy Governor-General	31 August 2018	Incumbent	8 years, 77 days	Saint Kitts and Nevis
Evelyne Decorps		French Southern and Antarctic Lands	Prefect and Superior Administrator	30 October 2018	16 September 2020	1 year, 322 days	France
Margaret Everson		United States Minor Outlying Islands	Administrator	12 November 2018	17 December 2018	35 days	United States
Lou Leon Guerrero		Guam	Governor	7 January 2019	Incumbent	7 years, 313 days	United States
Anissa Levy		Lord Howe Island	Chair of the Island Board	15 July 2019	1 January 2021	1 year, 170 days	Australia
Wanda Vázquez Garced		Puerto Rico	Governor	7 August 2019	2 January 2021	1 year, 148 days	United States
Caroline Cochrane		Northwest Territories	Premier	24 October 2019	8 December 2023	4 years, 45 days	Canada
Veronica Thörnroos		Åland Islands	Chief Minister	25 November 2019	11 December 2023	4 years, 16 days	Finland
Charlene Warren-Peu		Pitcairn Islands	Mayor	23 January 2020	31 December 2022	2 years, 342 days	United Kingdom
Fiona Kilpatrick		Tristan da Cunha	Co-Administrator	24 January 2020	11 September 2022	2 years, 231 days	United Kingdom
Fiona Kilpatrick		Pitcairn Islands	Co-Administrator	1 December 2022	1 April 2024	1 year, 122 days	United Kingdom
Rena Lalgie		Bermuda	Governor	14 December 2020	14 January 2025	4 years, 31 days	United Kingdom
Dileeni Daniel-Selvaratnam		Anguilla	Governor	18 January 2021	1 June 2023	2 years, 134 days	United Kingdom
Helen Winkelmann		Ross Dependency	Acting Governor-General	28 September 2021	21 October 2021	23 days	New Zealand
Cindy Kiro		Ross Dependency	Governor-General	21 October 2021	Incumbent	5 years, 26 days	New Zealand
Julie Thomas		Saint Helena	Chief Minister	25 October 2021	10 September 2025	3 years, 320 days	United Kingdom
Sarah Tucker		Montserrat	Governor	6 April 2022	8 April 2025	3 years, 2 days	United Kingdom
Natasha Fyles		Northern Territory	Chief Minister	13 May 2022	21 December 2023	1 year, 222 days	Australia
Kristina Moore		Jersey	Chief Minister	11 July 2022	30 January 2024	1 year, 203 days	United Kingdom
Alison Blake		Falkland Islands	Governor	23 July 2022	25 July 2025	3 years, 2 days	United Kingdom
Alison Blake		South Georgia and the South Sandwich Islands	Commissioner	23 July 2022	25 July 2025	3 years, 2 days	United Kingdom
Iona Thomas		Pitcairn Islands	Governor	3 August 2022	April 2026	3 years, 8 months	United Kingdom
Sarah Vandenbroek		Christmas Island	Acting Administrator	4 October 2022	26 May 2023	234 days	Australia
Sarah Vandenbroek		Cocos (Keeling) Islands	Acting Administrator	4 October 2022	26 May 2023	234 days	Australia
Lorraine Repetto		Tristan da Cunha	Acting Administrator	22 March 2023	4 July 2023	104 days	United Kingdom
Jane Owen		Cayman Islands	Governor	21 April 2023	Incumbent	3 years, 209 days	United Kingdom
Dileeni Daniel-Selvaratnam		Turks and Caicos Islands	Governor	29 June 2023	Incumbent	3 years, 140 days	United Kingdom
Farzian Zainal		Christmas Island	Administrator	26 May 2023	Incumbent	3 years, 174 days	Australia
Farzian Zainal		Cocos (Keeling) Islands	Administrator	26 May 2023	Incumbent	3 years, 174 days	Australia
Evghenia Guțul		Gagauzia	Governor	19 July 2023	Incumbent	3 years, 120 days	Moldova
Julia Crouch		Anguilla	Governor	11 September 2023	Incumbent	3 years, 66 days	United Kingdom
Eva Lawler		Northern Territory	Chief Minister	21 December 2023	28 August 2024	251 days	Australia
Lindsy Thompson		Pitcairn Islands	Administrator	1 April 2024	Incumbent	2 years, 229 days	United Kingdom
Lia Finocchiaro		Northern Territory	Chief Minister	28 August 2024	Incumbent	2 years, 80 days	Australia
Jenniffer González-Colón		Puerto Rico	Governor	2 January 2025	Incumbent	1 year, 318 days	United States
Cora Richardson-Hodge		Anguilla	Premier	27 February 2025	Incumbent	1 year, 262 days	United Kingdom
Harriet Cross		Montserrat	Governor	23 April 2025	Incumbent	1 year, 207 days	United Kingdom
Lindsay de Sausmarez		Guernsey	Chief Minister	1 July 2025	Incumbent	1 year, 138 days	United Kingdom
Rebecca Cairns-Wicks		Saint Helena	Chief Minister	10 September 2025	Incumbent	1 year, 67 days	United Kingdom
Louise Cantillon		Pitcairn Islands	Governor	18 August 2026	Incumbent	90 days	United Kingdom
Stacey Plaskett		United States Virgin Islands	Governor	4 January 2027	Elect	−49 days	United States

== See also ==
- List of first women governors and chief ministers
- List of the first women holders of political offices
- Lists of female state governors
- Women in government
