= 2021 Saint Helena general election =

← 2017	13 October 2021	2025 →
- Turnout: 60.18% (▲12.19pp)
Chief Minister after election
Julie Thomas
Independent

General elections were held in Saint Helena on 13 October 2021 to elect the 12 members of the Legislative Council. They were the first elections after a March 2021 referendum on changing the governance system of Saint Helena from a committee system to a ministerial system. Following the election, the island's first Chief Minister, Julie Thomas, was elected by members of the Legislative Council on its first session on 25 October.

== Electoral system ==
The 12 seats in the Legislative Council were elected by plurality-at-large voting, with voters allowed to cast up to 12 votes. There are no registered political parties, so all candidates ran as independents.

== Results ==
Candidate	Votes	%	Notes
Julie Dorne Thomas	888	68.52	Elected
Andrew James Turner	834	64.35	Elected
Corinda Sebastiana Stuart Essex	827	63.81	Re-elected
Martin Dave Henry	750	57.87	Elected
Jeffrey Robert Ellick	688	53.09	Re-elected (Note: Ellick was elected in a November 2019 by-election.)
Ronald Arthur Coleman	678	52.31	Elected
Karl Gavin Thrower	611	47.15	Elected
Gillian Ann Brooks	561	43.29	Elected
Mark Alan Brooks	533	41.13	Elected
Christine Scipio-O'Dean	532	41.05	Re-elected
Robert Charles Midwinter	485	37.42	Elected
Rosemary June Bargo	456	35.19	Elected
Russell Keith Yon	450	34.72	Unseated
Peter Anthony Young	410	31.64	
Derek Franklin Thomas	394	30.40	Unseated
Paul Laban	376	29.01	
Clint Richard Beard	369	28.47	Unseated
Melissa Kim Fowler	368	28.40	
Keith Gordon Brinsden	315	24.31	
Helene Virginia Williams	308	23.77	
Cruyff Gerard Buckley	299	23.07	Unseated
Gavin George Ellick	279	21.53	Unseated
Leslie Paul Baldwin	260	20.06	
Julie Christine Fowler	194	14.97	
Damien Shaun Thomas	187	14.43	
Lionel George Williams	67	5.17	
Elizabeth Knipe	65	5.02	
Donald Eric Thomas	65	5.02	
Patrick Arthur Williams	40	3.09	
Total	12,289	100.00	
Valid votes	1,296	99.62	
Invalid/blank votes	5	0.38	
Total votes	1,301	100.00	
Registered voters/turnout	2,162	60.18	
Source: St Helena Government, St Helena Government
