= List of first women governors and chief ministers =

This is a list of reportedly first women who have been elected or appointed governor and/or chief minister of their respective states, provinces or dependent territories. It may or may not be accurate, given that in some countries the first woman governor may not be in reliable sources, specially ancient times' female governors.

== List ==
Denotes incumbent governors and/or chief ministers
- Italics denotes acting governors and/or chief ministers that are either de facto (with limited to no international recognition) or defunct.

Name	Image	Country	Continent	Office	Mandate start	Mandate end	Term length
Artemisia II of Caria		Achaemenid Empire	Asia	Governor of Caria	353 BC	351 BC	2 years
Margaret of Austria		Burgundy	Europe	Governor of the Habsburg Netherlands	March 18, 1507	December 1, 1530	23 years, 258 days
Beatriz de la Cueva (First female governor of North America and all the Americas)		Castile	North America	Governor of the Captaincy General of Guatemala	9 September 1541	11 September 1541	2 days
Sigrid Sture		Sweden	Europe	Governor of Stranda Hundred	1577	1613	36 years
Ana Francisca de Borja y Doria (First female governor in South America)		Habsburg Spain	South America	Governor of Viceroyalty of Peru	7 June 1668	12 November 1668	158 days
Nellie Tayloe Ross (First female American governor)		United States	North America	Governor of Wyoming	5 January 1925	3 January 1927	1 year, 363 days
Miriam A. Wallace Ferguson		United States	North America	Governor of Texas	20 January 1925	17 January 1927	1 year, 362 days
Miriam A. Wallace Ferguson		United States	North America	Governor of Texas	17 January 1933	15 January 1935	1 year, 363 days
Olga Boettcher		Chile	South America	Governor of La Unión	1941	?	
Sarojini Naidu		India	Asia	Governor of United Provinces	15 August 1947	2 March 1949	1 year, 199 days
Josefina Valencia Muñoz		Colombia	South America	Governor of Valle del Cauca	21 September 1955	16 September 1956	361 days
Vijaya Lakshmi Pandit		India	Asia	Governor of Maharashtra	28 November 1962	18 October 1964	1 year, 324 days
Lurleen Wallace		United States	North America	Governor of Alabama	16 January 1967	7 May 1968	1 year, 362 days
Elizabeth Marcos-Keon		Philippines	Asia	Governor of Ilocos Norte	30 December 1971	23 March 1983	11 years, 83 days
Ra'ana Liaquat Ali Khan		Pakistan	Asia	Governor of Sindh	15 February 1973	28 February 1976	3 years, 13 days
Ebba Lodden		Norway	Europe	Governor of Aust-Agder	1974	1983	9 years
Ella T. Grasso (First female governor in the US who was elected on her own right) (Note: No special election, no due to husband, etc.)		United States	North America	Governor of Connecticut	8 January 1975	31 December 1980	5 years, 358 days
Imelda Marcos		Philippines	Asia	Governor of Metro Manila (Note: The only holder of the position.)	27 February 1975	25 February 1986	10 years, 363 days
Dixy Lee Ray		United States	North America	Governor of Washington	12 January 1977	14 January 1981	4 years, 2 days
Griselda Álvarez		Mexico	North America	Governor of Colima	1979	1985	6 years
Vesta M. Roy		United States	North America	Acting Governor of New Hampshire	29 December 1982	6 January 1983	8 days
Gu Xiulian		China	Asia	Governor of Jiangsu	1983	1989	6 years
Martha Layne Collins		United States	North America	Governor of Kentucky	13 December 1983	8 December 1987	3 years, 360 days
Madeleine Kunin		United States	North America	Governor of Vermont	20 January 1985	20 January 1991	6 years, 0 days
Iolanda Fleming		Brazil	South America	Governor of Acre	14 May 1986	15 March 1987	305 days
Kay A. Orr		United States	North America	Governor of Nebraska	9 January 1987	9 January 1991	4 years, 0 days
Rose Mofford		United States	North America	Governor of Arizona	4 April 1988	6 March 1991	2 years, 336 days
Rosemary Follett		Australia	Oceania	Chief Minister of the Australian Capital Territory	11 May 1989	5 December 1989	208 days
Rosemary Follett		Australia	Oceania	Chief Minister of the Australian Capital Territory	6 June 1991	2 March 1995	3 years, 269 days
Carmen Lawrence		Australia	Oceania	Premier of Western Australia	12 February 1990	16 February 1993	3 years, 4 days
Joan Kirner		Australia	Oceania	Premier of Victoria	10 August 1990	6 October 1992	2 years, 57 days
Sharon Pratt		United States	North America	Mayor of the District of Columbia	2 January 1991	2 January 1995	4 years, 0 days
Joan Finney		United States	North America	Governor of Kansas	14 January 1991	9 January 1995	3 years, 360 days
Barbara Roberts		United States	North America	Governor of Oregon	14 January 1991	9 January 1995	3 years, 360 days
Rita Johnston		Canada	North America	Premier of British Columbia	2 April 1991	5 November 1991	217 days
Nellie Cournoyea		Canada	North America	Premier of Northwest Territories	14 November 1991	22 November 1995	4 years, 8 days
Catherine Callbeck		Canada	North America	Premier of Prince Edward Island	25 January 1993	9 October 1996	3 years, 258 days
María Antonia Martínez		Spain	Europe	President of the Region of Murcia	28 April 1993	26 June 1995	2 years, 59 days
Laurette Onkelinx		Belgium	Europe	Minister-President of the French Community	6 May 1993	13 July 1999	6 years, 68 days
Heide Simonis		Germany	Europe	Minister-President of Schleswig-Holstein	19 May 1993	27 April 2005	11 years, 343 days
Agnes Lukudi		Sudan	Africa	Governor of Bahr-al-Jabal	1994	1998	4 years
Hannele Pokka		Finland	Europe	Governor of Lapland	1994	2008	14 years
Christine Todd Whitman		United States	North America	Governor of New Jersey	18 January 1994	16 January 2001	6 years, 364 days
Roseana Sarney		Brazil	South America	Governor of Maranhão	1 January 1995	5 April 2002	7 years, 94 days
Roseana Sarney		Brazil	South America	Governor of Maranhão	17 April 2009	10 December 2014	5 years, 237 days
Waltraud Klasnic		Austria	Europe	Governor of Styria	23 January 1996	25 October 2005	9 years, 275 days
Valentina Bronevich		Russia	Eurasia	Governor of Koryak Autonomous Okrug	17 November 1996	3 December 2000	4 years, 16 days
Ivy Matsepe-Casaburri		South Africa	Africa	Premier of Free State	18 December 1996	15 June 1999	2 years, 179 days
Jeanne Shaheen		United States	North America	Governor of New Hampshire	9 January 1997	9 January 2003	6 years, 0 days
Dipuo Peters		South Africa	Africa	Premier of the Northern Cape	11 May 1998	6 May 2009	10 years, 360 days
Nancy Hollister		United States	North America	Governor of Ohio	31 December 1998	11 January 1999	11 days
Fusae Ohta		Japan	Asia	Governor of Osaka	5 February 2000	4 February 2008	7 years, 364 days
Yoshiko Shiotani		Japan	Asia	Governor of Kumamoto	16 April 2000	15 April 2008	7 years, 365 days
Pat Duncan		Canada	North America	Premier of Yukon	6 May 2000	30 November 2002	2 years, 208 days
Akiko Dōmoto		Japan	Asia	Governor of Chiba	2001	2009	8 years, 0 days
Judy Martz		United States	North America	Governor of Montana	1 January 2001	3 January 2005	4 years, 2 days
Sila María Calderón		United States	North America	Governor of Puerto Rico	2 January 2001	2 January 2005	4 years, 0 days
Ruth Ann Minner		United States	North America	Governor of Delaware	3 January 2001	20 January 2009	8 years, 17 days
Teresita S. Lazaro		Philippines	Asia	Governor of Laguna	30 January 2001	30 June 2010	9 years, 151 days
Jane Swift		United States	North America	Governor of Massachusetts	10 April 2001	2 January 2003	1 year, 267 days
Clare Martin		Australia	Oceania	Chief Minister of Northern Territory	18 August 2001	26 November 2007	6 years, 100 days
Alicia Lemme		Argentina	South America	Governor of San Luis	23 December 2001	10 December 2003	1 year, 352 days
Dalva Figueiredo		Brazil	South America	Governor of Amapá	5 April 2002	1 January 2003	271 days
Benedita da Silva		Brazil	South America	Governor of Rio de Janeiro	6 April 2002	1 January 2003	270 days
Linda Lingle		United States	Oceania	Governor of Hawaii	2 December 2002	6 December 2010	8 years, 4 days
Mirta Ramona Mendoza		Paraguay	South America	Governor of Concepción	2003	2008	5 years
Wilma de Faria		Brazil	South America	Governor of Rio Grande do Norte	1 January 2003	31 March 2010	7 years, 89 days
Jennifer Granholm		United States	North America	Governor of Michigan	1 January 2003	1 January 2011	8 years, 0 days
Harumi Takahashi		Japan	Asia	Governor of Hokkaido	23 April 2003	22 April 2019	15 years, 364 days
Valentina Matviyenko		Russia	Eurasia	Governor of Saint Petersburg	15 October 2003	22 August 2011	7 years, 311 days
Olene Walker		United States	North America	Governor of Utah	5 November 2003	3 January 2005	1 year, 59 days
Esperanza Aguirre		Spain	Europe	President of the Community of Madrid	8 November 2003	26 September 2012	8 years, 323 days
Kathleen Blanco		United States	North America	Governor of Louisiana	1 January 2004	1 January 2008	4 years, 2 days
Catherine Mabuza		South Africa	Africa	Acting Premier of Limpopo	22 April 2004	26 April 2004	4 days
Nosimo Balindlela		South Africa	Africa	Premier of Eastern Cape	26 April 2004	25 July 2008	4 years, 90 days
Gabi Burgstaller		Austria	Europe	Governor of Salzburg	28 April 2004	19 June 2013	9 years, 52 days
Edna Molewa		South Africa	Africa	Premier of North West	30 April 2004	6 May 2009	5 years, 6 days
Gwendolyn Garcia		Philippines	Asia	Governor of Cebu	30 June 2004	30 June 2013	9 years, 0 days
Grace Padaca		Philippines	Asia	Governor of Isabela	30 June 2004	30 June 2010	6 years, 0 days
Iryna Syniavska		Ukraine	Europe	Governor of Zhytomyr Oblast	3 February 2005	16 June 2006	1 year, 133 days
Ratu Atut Chosiyah		Indonesia	Asia	Governor of Banten	20 October 2005	13 May 2014	8 years, 205 days (Note: Acting governor until 11 January 2007.)
Nadiia Dieieva		Ukraine	Europe	Governor of Dnipropetrovsk Oblast	11 November 2005	3 September 2007	1 year, 296 days
Maria de Lourdes Abadia		Brazil	South America	Governor of the Brazilian Federal District	31 March 2006	1 January 2007	276 days
Vira Ulianchenko		Ukraine	Europe	Governor of Kyiv Oblast	16 June 2006	20 May 2009	2 years, 338 days
Yukiko Kada		Japan	Asia	Governor of Shiga	20 July 2006	19 July 2014	7 years, 364 days
Sarah Palin		United States	North America	Governor of Alaska	4 December 2006	26 July 2009	4 years, 2 days
Ana Júlia Carepa		Brazil	South America	Governor of Pará	1 January 2007	1 January 2011	4 years, 0 days
Yeda Crusius		Brazil	South America	Governor of Rio Grande do Sul	1 January 2007	1 January 2011	4 years, 0 days
Jum Jainudin Akbar		Philippines	Asia	Governor of Basilan	30 June 2007	30 June 2016	9 years, 0 days
Vilma Santos		Philippines	Asia	Governor of Batangas	30 June 2007	30 June 2016	9 years, 0 days
Louise Lake-Tack		Antigua and Barbuda	North America	Governor of Antigua and Barbuda	17 July 2007	14 August 2014	7 years, 28 days
Anna Bligh		Australia	Oceania	Premier of Queensland	13 September 2007	26 March 2012	4 years, 195 days
Lynne Brown		South Africa	Africa	Premier of Western Cape	25 July 2008	6 May 2009	1 year, 11 days
Eva Aariak		Canada	North America	Premier of Nunavut	19 November 2008	19 November 2013	5 years, 0 days
Bev Perdue		United States	North America	Governor of North Carolina	10 January 2009	5 January 2013	3 years, 361 days
Mieko Yoshimura		Japan	Asia	Governor of Yamagata	14 February 2009	Incumbent	17 years, 176 days
Nomvula Mokonyane		South Africa	Africa	Premier of Gauteng	6 May 2009	21 May 2014	5 years, 15 days
Margaret Alva		India	Asia	Governor of Uttarakhand	6 August 2009	14 May 2012	2 years, 282 days
Christine Lieberknecht		Germany	Europe	Minister-President of Thuringia	30 October 2009	5 December 2014	5 years, 36 days
Kristina Keneally		Australia	Oceania	Premier of New South Wales	4 December 2009	28 March 2011	1 year, 114 days
Natalya Komarova		Russia	Eurasia	Governor of Khanty-Mansi Autonomous Okrug	1 March 2010	30 May 2024	14 years, 90 days
Lilia Pineda		Philippines	Asia	Governor of Pampanga	30 June 2010	30 June 2019	9 years, 0 days
Carmencita Reyes		Philippines	Asia	Governor of Marinduque	30 June 2010	7 January 2019	8 years, 191 days
Sharee Ann Tan		Philippines	Asia	Governor of Samar	30 June 2010	30 June 2019	9 years, 0 days
Sharee Ann Tan		Philippines	Asia	Governor of Samar	30 June 2022	Incumbent	4 years, 40 days
Sharee Ann Tan		Philippines	Asia	Governor of Samar	Total time in office		10 years, 1136 days
Hannelore Kraft		Germany	Europe	Minister-President of North Rhine-Westphalia	14 July 2010	27 June 2017	6 years, 348 days
Kathy Dunderdale		Canada	North America	Premier of Newfoundland and Labrador	3 December 2010	24 January 2014	3 years, 52 days
Susana Martinez		United States	North America	Governor of New Mexico	1 January 2011	1 January 2019	8 years, 0 days
Mary Fallin		United States	North America	Governor of Oklahoma	10 January 2011	14 January 2019	8 years, 4 days
Nikki Haley		United States	North America	Governor of South Carolina	12 January 2011	24 January 2017	6 years, 12 days
Lara Giddings		Australia	Oceania	Premier of Tasmania	24 January 2011	31 March 2014	3 years, 66 days
María Dolores de Cospedal		Spain	Europe	President of the Government of Castilla–La Mancha	22 June 2011	1 July 2015	4 years, 9 days
Yolanda Barcina		Spain	Europe	President of the Government of Navarre	23 June 2011	20 July 2015	4 years, 27 days
Luisa Fernanda Rudi		Spain	Europe	President of the Government of Aragon	13 July 2011	3 July 2015	3 years, 355 days
Annegret Kramp-Karrenbauer		Germany	Europe	Minister-President of Saarland	10 August 2011	28 February 2018	6 years, 202 days
Alison Redford		Canada	North America	Premier of Alberta	7 October 2011	23 March 2014	2 years, 167 days
Marina Kovtun		Russia	Eurasia	Governor of Murmansk Oblast	13 April 2012	21 March 2019	7 years, 8 days
Pauline Marois		Canada	North America	Premier of Quebec	19 September 2012	23 April 2014	1 year, 216 days
Christina Scott		United Kingdom	North America	Governor of Anguilla	2013	2017	4 years
Malu Dreyer		Germany	Europe	Minister-President of Rhineland-Palatinate	16 January 2013	10 July 2024	11 years, 176 days
Kathleen Wynne		Canada	North America	Premier of Ontario	11 February 2013	29 June 2018	5 years, 138 days
Angelica Amante		Philippines	Asia	Governor of Agusan del Norte	30 June 2013	30 June 2019	6 years, 0 days
Daisy A. Fuentes		Philippines	Asia	Governor of South Cotabato	30 June 2013	30 June 2019	6 years, 0 days
Emmylou Taliño-Mendoza		Philippines	Asia	Governor of Cotabato	30 June 2013	30 June 2019	6 years, 0 days
Rebecca Ynares		Philippines	Asia	Governor of Rizal	30 June 2013	30 June 2022	9 years, 0 days
Susana Díaz		Spain	Europe	President of the Government of Andalusia	5 September 2013	18 January 2019	5 years, 135 days
Svetlana Orlova		Russia	Eurasia	Governor of Vladimir Oblast	23 September 2013	8 October 2018	5 years, 15 days
Iryna Sekh		Ukraine	Europe	Governor of Lviv Oblast	2 March 2014	14 August 2014	165 days
Nicola Sturgeon		United Kingdom	Europe	First Minister of Scotland	20 November 2014	28 March 2023	8 years, 128 days
Suely Campos		Brazil	South America	Governor of Roraima	1 January 2015	10 December 2018	3 years, 343 days
Gina Raimondo		United States	North America	Governor of Rhode Island	6 January 2015	2 March 2021	6 years, 55 days
Rhodora Cadiao		Philippines	Asia	Governor of Antique	3 February 2015	28 March 2016	1 year, 54 days
Rhodora Cadiao		Philippines	Asia	Governor of Antique	30 June 2016	30 June 2025	9 years, 0 days
Rhodora Cadiao		Philippines	Asia	Governor of Antique	Total time in office		10 years, 54 days
Francina Armengol		Spain	Europe	President of the Government of the Balearic Islands	2 July 2015	Incumbent	11 years, 38 days
Arlene Foster		United Kingdom	Europe	First Minister of Northern Ireland	11 January 2016	9 January 2017	364 days
Arlene Foster		United Kingdom	Europe	First Minister of Northern Ireland	11 January 2020	14 June 2021	1 year, 154 days
Natalia Zhdanova		Russia	Eurasia	Governor of Zabaykalsky Krai	18 February 2016	11 October 2018	2 years, 235 days
Nang Khin Htwe Myint		Myanmar	Asia	Chief Minister of Kayin	30 March 2016	1 February 2021	4 years, 308 days
Lae Lae Maw		Myanmar	Asia	Chief Minister of Tanintharyi	30 March 2016	11 March 2019	2 years, 346 days
Bedjoria Soraya Adiong		Philippines	Asia	Governor of Lanao del Sur	30 June 2016	30 June 2019	3 years, 0 days
Maria Jocelyn Bernos		Philippines	Asia	Governor of Abra	30 June 2016	30 June 2022	6 years, 0 days
Marilou Cayco		Philippines	Asia	Governor of Batanes	30 June 2016	30 June 2025	9 years, 0 days
Imelda Dimaporo		Philippines	Asia	Governor of Lanao del Norte	30 June 2016	30 June 2025	9 years, 0 days
Maria Luisa Romualdo		Philippines	Asia	Governor of Camiguin	30 June 2016	30 June 2019	3 years, 0 days
Czarina Umali		Philippines	Asia	Governor of Nueva Ecija	30 June 2016	30 June 2019	3 years, 0 days
Susan Yap		Philippines	Asia	Governor of Tarlac	30 June 2016	30 June 2025	9 years, 0 days
Yuriko Koike		Japan	Asia	Governor of Tokyo	1 August 2016	Incumbent	10 years, 8 days
Yuliya Svitlychna		Ukraine	Europe	Governor of Kharkiv Oblast	15 October 2016	5 November 2019	3 years, 21 days
Johanna Mikl-Leitner		Austria	Europe	Governor of Lower Austria	19 April 2017	Incumbent	9 years, 112 days
Kim Reynolds		United States	North America	Governor of Iowa	24 May 2017	Incumbent	9 years, 77 days
Manuela Schwesig		Germany	Europe	Minister-President of Mecklenburg-Vorpommern	4 July 2017	Incumbent	9 years, 36 days
Refilwe Mtsweni-Tsipane		South Africa	Africa	Premier of Mpumalanga	20 March 2018	18 June 2024	6 years, 90 days
Cida Borghetti		Brazil	South America	Governor of Paraná	6 April 2018	1 January 2019	270 days
Janet Mills		United States	North America	Governor of Maine	2 January 2019	Incumbent	7 years, 219 days
Kristi Noem		United States	North America	Governor of South Dakota	5 January 2019	25 January 2025	6 years, 20 days
Lou Leon Guerrero		United States	Oceania	Governor of Guam	7 January 2019	Incumbent	7 years, 214 days
Khofifah Indar Parawansa		Indonesia	Asia	Governor of East Java	13 February 2019	13 February 2024	5 years, 0 days
Bai Mariam Mangudadatu		Philippines	Asia	Governor of Maguindanao	30 June 2019	13 October 2022	3 years, 105 days
Liesbeth Homans		Belgium	Europe	Minister-President of Flanders	2 July 2019	1 October 2019	91 days
Concha Andreu		Spain	Europe	President of La Rioja	29 August 2019	29 June 2023	3 years, 304 days
Anna Kovalenko		Ukraine	Europe	Governor of Chernihiv Oblast	13 October 2020	4 August 2021	295 days
Mariya Chorna		Ukraine	Europe	Governor of Kirovohrad Oblast	27 May 2021	7 March 2022	284 days
Svitlana Onyshchuk		Ukraine	Europe	Governor of Ivano-Frankivsk Oblast	8 July 2021	Incumbent	5 years, 32 days
Kathy Hochul		United States	North America	Governor of New York	24 August 2021	Incumbent	4 years, 350 days
Julie Thomas		Saint Helena	Africa	Chief Minister	25 October 2021	10 September 2025	3 years, 320 days
Heather Stefanson		Canada	North America	Premier of Manitoba	2 November 2021	18 October 2023	1 year, 350 days
Kristina Moore		Jersey	Europe	Chief Minister	12 July 2022	30 January 2024	1 year, 202 days
Maryam Nawaz		Pakistan	Asia	Chief Minister of Punjab	26 February 2024	Incumbent	2 years, 164 days
Eluned Morgan		United Kingdom	Europe	First Minister of Wales	6 August 2024	Incumbent	2 years, 3 days
Susan Holt		Canada	North America	Premier of New Brunswick	2 November 2024	Incumbent	1 year, 280 days
Lindsay de Sausmarez		United Kingdom	Europe	Chief Minister of Guernsey	1 July 2025	Incumbent	1 year, 39 days
Abigail Spanberger		United States	North America	Governor of Virginia	17 January 2026	Incumbent	204 days

== See also ==
- List of the first women holders of political offices
- Council of Women World Leaders
- List of current state leaders by date of assumption of office
- List of female constituent and dependent territory leaders
