= Christine Scipio-O'Dean =

Politician from Saint Helena

Christine Scipio-O'Dean MLC

Minister for Environment, Natural Resources and Planning
- In office 1 November 2021 – 4 September 2025
- Monarchs: Elizabeth II; Charles III
- Governor: Philip Rushbrook; Nigel Phillips
- Preceded by: Office established

Personal details
- Children: 2
- Occupation: Politician

Christine Scipio-O'Dean (born 1971) is a politician from Saint Helena, who was a supporter of the approval of same-sex marriage in Saint Helena.

== Career ==
Scipio-O'Dean was first elected councillor in 2012, as a result of a by-election after the resignation of Tara Thomas, and became one of two women councillors alongside Bernice Olsson. Prior to her political career she worked as a teacher and in finance administration. She was re-elected in 2013, and was appointed Executive Councillor for Education. In 2014 she attended the 60th Commonwealth Parliamentary Conference, held in Cameroon.

In 2017 she was re-elected to the Legislative Council and was appointed as Chair of the Education Committee and Member of the Economic Development Committee. That year she supported the approval of same-sex marriage in Saint Helena. In 2019 she attended the 6th British Islands and Mediterranean Region (BIMR) Commonwealth Women Parliamentarians (CWP) Conference in Jersey. In 2020 she attended the British Islands and Mediterranean Region Commonwealth Women Parliamentarians Conference, hosted by the Falkland Islands Legislative Assembly.

In 2021, Scipio-O'Dean was re-elected to the Legislative Council. She was also appointed as Minister for Environment, Natural Resources and Planning on 1 November 2021. She did not run for re-election in the 2025 Saint Helena general election.

== Personal life ==
Scipio-O'Dean has two children.
