= 2013 Saint Helena Chief Councillor referendum =

23 March 2013
- Should St Helena have a Chief Councillor who can select the Executive Council?

Results
Choice	Votes	%
Yes	42	20.00%
No	168	80.00%
Valid votes	210	100.00%
Invalid or blank votes	0	0.00%
Total votes	210	100.00%
Registered voters/turnout	1,277	16.44%

A referendum on creating the post of Chief Councillor was held in Saint Helena on 23 March 2013. The proposal was rejected by 80% of voters, with voter turnout at just 10%.

== Background ==
In January 2013 the Government of Saint Helena published proposals for amendments to the constitution. This included the appointment of a Chief Councillor from the 12-member Legislative Council, who would appoint a further four members of the Executive Council instead of the entire Executive Council being elected by the Legislative Council.

== Results ==
Choice	Votes	%
For	42	20.00
Against	168	80.00
Invalid/blank votes	0	–
Total	210	100
Registered voters/turnout	1,277	9.65
Source: Friends of St Helena
