= 2021 Saint Helena governance system referendum =

Referendum in British Overseas Territory

A two-part consultative referendum on changing the system of governance was held in Saint Helena on 17 March 2021. In the first question, voters were asked whether there should be a change. In the second, they were asked for their preference on the form of governance, choosing between a committee system and a ministerial system.

After 79% of voters voted in favour of a change, the ministerial option was chosen by 56% of voters, although voter turnout was just 17%.

== Background ==
In 2013 a referendum was held on a proposal to create a Chief Councillor appointed from amongst the 12 elected MLCs, who would in turn have a appointed four members to the Executive Council. The proposal was rejected by 80% of voters, although voter turnout was less than 10%.

Following a report produced by Jeremy Sarkin in 2019, a public consultation on possible alternative forms of governance to the existing committee system was held in 2020. A Progress Committee was established by the Legislative Council to finalise details of two potential systems, an amended committee system or a ministerial system.

On 16 January 2021 the Legislative Council unanimously voted for a consultative referendum to be held in February. However, this was delayed until March after discussions with the Overseas Territories Directorate of the British Foreign, Commonwealth and Development Office.

== Proposals ==
The island previously had a Legislative Council with twelve elected members and five appointed members consisting of the Chief Secretary, Financial Secretary, Attorney General, Speaker and Deputy Speaker, although none of the appointed members were able to vote. Five members of the Legislative Council were elected to an Executive Council presided over by the Governor appointed by the Queen, where they sat alongside the Chief Secretary, Financial Secretary and Attorney General, who were also unable to vote in Executive Council debates.

The two options presented to voters were an amended committee system or a ministerial system.

In the amended committee option, the number of elected members on each of the five committees would be reduced from five to one or two, with the chair of each committee being given more responsibility for financial management and delivery of policy.

In the ministerial option, the Chief Secretary and Financial Secretary would no longer be members of the Legislative Council. The Council would elect a Chief Minister from amongst themselves, who would then select four ministers from among the remaining elected members; these five would form the Executive Council alongside the Attorney General (as a non-voting member) and the Governor, who would be its chair. The Legislative Council members not appointed to the Executive Council would be assigned a constituency to represent.

== Results ==
Do you want the current system of governance to be changed?
| Choice | Votes | % |
|---|---|---|
| For | 286 | 79.22 |
| Against | 75 | 20.78 |
| Total | 361 | 100.00 |
| Valid votes | 361 | 97.30 |
| Invalid/blank votes | 10 | 2.70 |
| Total votes | 371 | 100.00 |
| Registered voters/turnout | 2,153 | 17.23 |
Source: St Helena Government

If the public will is for a change to the current system of governance, should the governance system be changed to:
| Choice | Votes | % |
|---|---|---|
| Ministerial System | 185 | 55.06 |
| Revised Committee System | 151 | 44.94 |
| Total | 336 | 100.00 |
| Valid votes | 336 | 90.57 |
| Invalid/blank votes | 35 | 9.43 |
| Total votes | 371 | 100.00 |
| Registered voters/turnout | 2,153 | 17.23 |
Source: St Helena Government

== Aftermath ==
Following the referendum, the Legislative Council endorsed the results of the referendum, after which the constitution amendments were approved by the British Privy Council in July. The new system is to be first put in use after the 2021 Saint Helena general election for the electoral council, which will choose the first Chief Minister of Saint Helena.
