= 2017 Saint Helena general election =

General elections were held in Saint Helena on 26 July 2017. A total of 17 candidates contested the elections.

== Electoral system ==
The 12 seats in the Legislative Council were elected by plurality-at-large voting, with voters allowed to cast up to 12 votes. Eight polling stations were opened for voting.

== Results ==
Candidate	Votes	%	Notes
Russell Keith Yon	753	68.08	Elected
Corinda Sebastiana Stuart Essex	742	67.09	Re-elected (Note: Essex was first elected in a by-election on 12 March 2014.)
Derek Franklin Thomas	668	60.40	Re-elected
Brian William Isaac	631	57.05	Re-elected
Lawson Arthur Henry	568	51.36	Re-elected
Cyril Kenneth Leo	561	50.72	Elected
Clint Richard Beard	513	46.38	Elected
Anthony Arthur Green	476	43.04	Re-elected (Note: Green was first elected in the 2013 general election, but stepped down officially on 17 December 2013 for family reasons.)
Cruyff Gerard Buckley	471	42.59	Re-elected (Note: Buckley was first elected in a by-election on 7 September 2016.)
Kylie Marie Hercules	460	41.59	Elected
Gavin George Ellick	458	41.41	Re-elected
Christine Scipio-O'Dean	392	35.44	Re-elected
Cyril Keith Gunnell	383	34.63	
Jeremy James Johns	333	30.11	
Elizabeth Margaret Johnson-Idan	299	27.03	
Pamela Ward Pearce	198	17.90	Unseated (Note: Pearce was first elected in a by-election on 4 March 2015.)
Marian Bernadette Yon	136	12.30	
Total	8,042	100.00	
Valid votes	1,106	99.82	
Invalid/blank votes	2	0.18	
Total votes	1,108	100.00	
Registered voters/turnout	2,309	47.99	
Source: Government of St Helena, IFES
