= List of current heads of government in the United Kingdom and dependencies =

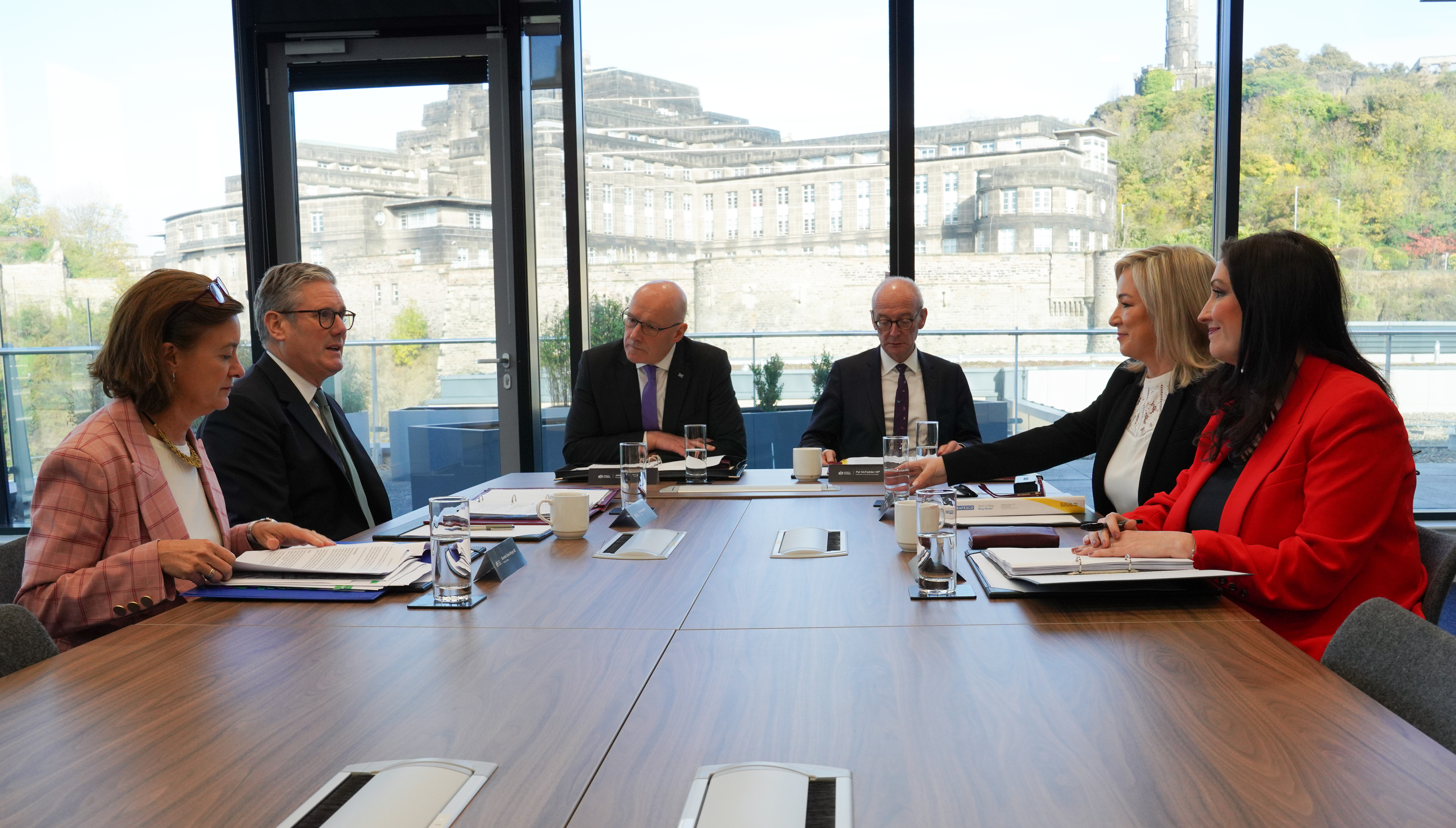
Leaders from across the United Kingdom meet in Edinburgh for the Council of Nations and Regions. L–R: Morgan (Wales), Starmer (UK), Swinney (Scotland), McFadden (UK), O'Neill (Northern Ireland), and Little-Pengelly (Northern Ireland)

In the United Kingdom, various titles are used for the head of government of each of the countries of the United Kingdom, Crown Dependencies, and Overseas Territories. Following elections to the assembly or parliament, the party (or coalition) with a majority of seats is invited to form a government. The monarch (in the United Kingdom) or governor / lieutenant governor (in the Overseas Territories and Crown Dependencies) appoints the head of government, whose council of ministers are collectively responsible to their respective parliaments.

The head of the British government is referred to as the prime minister, whilst the head of the Northern Ireland Executive, Scottish Government and Welsh Government is referred to as a first minister, and the terms chief minister and premier are used in the Overseas Territories. In the Crown Dependencies, the term chief minister is used in all apart from Guernsey, where the leader is referred to as the president of the Policy and Resources Committee.

== Government of the United Kingdom ==
| Country | Position | Name | Portrait | Since | Party | Ref |
|---|---|---|---|---|---|---|
| United Kingdom | Prime Minister | Andy Burnham | | 20 July 2026 (2 months ago) | Labour | |

== Devolved governments ==
| Country | Position | Name | Portrait | Since | Party (Note: This column names only the leader's party. The executive they are heading may be a coalition of parties and independents; those are not listed here.) | Ref |
|---|---|---|---|---|---|---|
| Northern Ireland | First Minister | Michelle O'Neill | | 3 February 2024 (2 years ago) | Sinn Féin | |
| Northern Ireland | Deputy First Minister | Emma Little-Pengelly | | 3 February 2024 (2 years ago) | Democratic Unionist Party | |
| Scotland | First Minister | John Swinney | | 8 May 2024 (2 years ago) | Scottish National Party | |
| Wales | First Minister | Rhun ap Iorwerth | | 12 May 2026 (4 months ago) | Plaid Cymru | |

== Crown Dependencies ==
| Crown dependency | Position | Name | Portrait | Since | Party | Ref |
|---|---|---|---|---|---|---|
| Bailiwick of Guernsey | P&RC President | Lindsay de Sausmarez | | 1 July 2025 (15 months ago) | Independent | |
| Bailiwick of Jersey | Chief Minister | Lyndon Farnham | | 30 January 2024 (2 years ago) | Independent | |
| Isle of Man | Chief Minister | Alfred Cannan | | 12 October 2021 (4 years ago) | Independent | |

== Overseas Territories ==
| Overseas Territory | Position | Name | Portrait | Since | Party | Ref |
|---|---|---|---|---|---|---|
| Anguilla | Premier | Cora Richardson-Hodge | | 27 February 2025 (19 months ago) | Anguilla United Front | |
| Bermuda | Premier | Edward David Burt | | 19 July 2017 (9 years ago) | Progressive Labour Party | |
| British Virgin Islands | Premier | Natalio Wheatley | | 5 May 2022 (4 years ago) | Virgin Islands Party | |
| Cayman Islands | Premier | André Ebanks | | 6 May 2025 (17 months ago) | Caymanian Community Party | |
| Falkland Islands | Chief Executive | Andrea Clausen | | 1 April 2025 (18 months ago) | Independent | |
| Gibraltar | Chief Minister | Fabian Picardo | | 9 December 2011 (14 years ago) | Gibraltar Socialist Labour Party | |
| Montserrat | Premier | Reuben Meade | | 25 October 2024 (23 months ago) | United Alliance | |
| Pitcairn Islands | Mayor | Shawn Christian | | 1 January 2026 (9 months ago) | Independent | |
| Saint Helena | Chief Minister | Rebecca Cairns-Wicks | | 10 September 2025 (13 months ago) | Independent | |
| Turks and Caicos Islands | Premier | Washington Misick | | 20 February 2021 (5 years ago) | Progressive National Party | |

== See also ==
- List of current viceregal representatives of the Crown
- List of rulers of the United Kingdom and predecessor states
