= Politics of Saint Helena =

Politics of Saint Helena takes place in a framework of limited self-government as a dependent territory of the United Kingdom, whereby the governor is the head of government. Saint Helena, an island in the southern Atlantic Ocean, is a part of the British overseas territory of Saint Helena, Ascension and Tristan da Cunha.

It has had its present constitution since 1 September 2009. Executive power is exercised by the governor and the Executive Council. Legislative power is vested in both the governor and the Legislative Council. The judiciary is independent of the executive and the legislature.

The territory maintains its own police service, the Royal Saint Helena Police Service, while defence is the responsibility of the United Kingdom. No British military forces are stationed on Saint Helena, although the Royal Air Force maintains a staging base on constituent Ascension Island.

Saint Helena had until 2009 two dependencies: Ascension Island and Tristan da Cunha. These territories have their own political structures with Administrators under the governor of Saint Helena. They are now equal parts of Saint Helena, Ascension and Tristan da Cunha along with St Helena itself.

== Executive branch ==
Main office-holders
| Office | Name | Party | Since |
|---|---|---|---|
| Monarch | Charles III | | 8 September 2022 |
| Governor and Commander-in-Chief | Nigel Phillips | | 13 August 2022 |
| Chief Minister | Rebecca Cairns-Wicks | | 10 September 2025 |

The Executive Council consists of the governor, three ex officio officers (one, the attorney general, having no vote), and up to five elected members of the Legislative Council, including the Chief Minister, who serve as ministers. The monarch is the reigning monarch of the United Kingdom and is hereditary; the governor is appointed by the monarch on the advice of the British government. The chief secretary is the main advisor to the governor on the island and runs the administrative side of the government, which is based at The Castle in the capital, Jamestown.

Currently, the elected members of the Legislative Council who now serves on the Executive Council are:

1. Rebecca Elizabeth Cairns-Wicks Chief Minister, Treasury and Central Support Services
2. Andrew James Turner Education, Skills and Employment Portfolio
3. Karl Gavin Thrower Environment, Natural Resources and Planning, Economic Development
4. Gillian Ann Brooks Safety, Security and Home Affairs
5. Martin Dave Henry Health and Social Care

== Legislative branch ==
The Legislative Council has 15 members, 12 members elected for a four-year term by popular vote and 3 members ex officio. This arrangement gives the governing of Saint Helena an aspect of representative democracy.

=== Political parties and elections ===
Saint Helena, along with both Ascension Island and Tristan da Cunha, does not have any active political parties, although no law forbids their formation; hence, the territory is a de facto non-partisan democracy. The Saint Helena Labour Party and Saint Helena Progressive Party existed until 1976.

In the most recent general election, the twelve elected members are:

1. Rebecca Elizabeth Cairns-Wicks (823 votes)
2. Andrew James Turner (761 votes)*
3. Corinda Sebastiana Stuart Essex (730 votes)*
4. Karl Gavin Thrower (650 votes)*
5. Dennis Karl Leo (644 votes)
6. Derek Franklin Thomas (629 votes)
7. Gillian Ann Brooks (543 votes)*
8. Martin Dave Henry (541 votes)*
9. Robert Charles Midwinter (441 votes)*
10. Clint Richard Beard (407 votes)
11. Julie Dorne Thomas (403 votes)*
12. Ronald Arthur Coleman (389 votes)*

An asterisk (*) denotes a sitting incumbent MLC who was duly re-elected.

== Judicial branch ==
The territory has four courts of its own:

- Court of Appeal
- Supreme Court
- Magistrates Court
- Juvenile Court

The Judicial Committee of the Privy Council, in London, is the final court of appeal for the territory however, as is the case with all other British overseas territories.

== International organization participation ==
- ITUC
