= Maureen Thompson =

Saint Helenian politician

The Honourable Maureen Thompson

Speaker of the Legislative Council of Saint Helena
- Incumbent
- Assumed office 11 September 2025
- Preceded by: Cyril Gunnell

Maureen Thompson is a Saint Helenian politician. She has served as Speaker of the Legislative Council of Saint Helena since 11 September 2025.
