= The Catechesis of the Good Shepherd =

Christian education method

The Catechesis of the Good Shepherd is a Montessori method for Christian education in the Catholic Church and the Anglican Communion. The method is offered in churches and schools across 37 countries.

== Founding ==
The method was developed by Sofia Cavaletti, a scholar of Hebrew and the Bible, and Gianna Gobbi, a teacher in the Montessori method. Cavaletti was characterized as "arguably the most effective catechetical theorist and practitioner of her era". The development of the method began in 1954, following a discussion with children regarding a Bible passage; Cavaletti and Giobbi sought to discover what teaching message would best suit these children. They jointly identified Bible passages that resonated with the children, chief among them the parable of the Good Shepherd, and then developed hands-on materials and lesson plans that enabled the children to engage in the contemplation of these Bible passages.

In the United States, the method was pioneered by Sr. Evelyn Boyle, a sister of the Union of Sisters of the Presentation of the Blessed Virgin Mary.

== Method ==
As with the Montessori method, The Catechesis of the Good Shepherd method is child-centered and hands-on. Led by trained teachers, children are guided through a series of lessons which teach the Bible and the liturgy. The aim is to tap into the religious potential of the child, so as to foster the child's encounter with God and relationship with Jesus Christ.

The curriculum is taught in a classroom, called an atrium, which is specially prepared. Children are separated into four age groups: Level T (infant & toddler), Level I (ages 3–6), Level II (ages 6–9), Level III (ages 9–12); each age group meets in a separate atrium, and is taught lessons in a scope and sequence tailored to their age group.

The lessons, with corresponding hands-on materials, are of these types:

- The Life of Christ
- Geography, Infancy Narratives, Paschal Narratives
- The Liturgy and the Liturgical Year
- The Sacraments
- The Parables of the Kingdom
- The Moral Parables
- Maxims (teachings of Jesus)
- The Good Shepherd Parable
- Prayer and Scripture
- Kingdom of God and Creation
- Typology (Scripture Study for older students)

== Derivatives ==
Young Children & Worship, a collection of lessons with accompanying hands-on materials, was developed by Jerome Berryman, an Episcopal priest, and Sonja Stewart, a professor of Christian education at Western Theological Seminary. Berryman had studied the Montessori method in Italy, and had been trained in the Catechesis of the Good Shepherd. Berryman further developed their ideas into Godly Play, a method with curriculum. This method served as an alternative which is suitable for Protestants. Godly Play, in turn, has sparked several derivatives.

Although there are apparent similarities in methodology and praxis, there are also key methodological and theological differences between the Catechesis of the Good Shepherd and Godly Play.
