= Plurality block voting =

Non-proportional electoral system

Plurality block, also called as multiple non-transferable vote, and block plurality voting, is a type of block voting method for multi-winner elections. Each voter may cast as many votes as the number of seats to be filled. The candidates with the most votes are elected. The usual result when the candidates divide into parties is that the most popular party in the district sees its full slate of candidates elected, even if the party does not have support of majority of the voters.

The term plurality at-large is in common usage in elections for representative members of a body who are elected or appointed to represent the whole membership of the body (for example, a city, state or province, nation or country, club or association). (The plurality at-large election system is common in cities. The Senate of the Philippines is elected by the rare country-wide use of block voting.) Where the system is used in a territory divided into multi-member electoral districts, the system is commonly referred to as "block voting" or the "bloc vote". These systems are usually based on a single round of voting.

The party-list version of block voting is party block voting (PBV), also called the general ticket, which also elects members by plurality in multi-member districts. In such a system, each party puts forward a slate of candidates, a voter casts just one vote, and the party winning a plurality of votes sees its whole slate elected, winning all the seats; and is thus distinct from plurality block voting.

== Casting and counting ballots ==
=== Block voting ===
In a block voting election, all candidates run against each other for m number of positions, where m is commonly called the district magnitude. Each voter selects up to m candidates on the ballot. Each of the voters have m votes, and are able to cast no more than one per candidate. They cannot vote for the same candidate more than once, as is permitted in cumulative voting.

Voters are permitted to cast their votes across candidates of different parties (ticket splitting).

The m candidates with the most votes (who may or may not obtain a majority of available votes or support from the majority of the voters) are declared elected and will fill the positions.

Due to multiple voting, when a party runs more than one candidate, it is impossible to know if the party had support of as many voters as the party tally of votes (up to number of voters participating in the election) or if it had support of just the number of voters equivalent to the votes received by the most popular candidate and the other candidates of that party merely received votes from subset of that group.

=== Example ===
Candidates are running in a three-member district; each of the 10,000 voters may cast three votes (but do not have to). Voters may not cast more than one vote for a single candidate.

Party A has about 35% support among the electorate, Party B around 25% and the remaining voters primarily support independent candidates.

Candidate	Party	Votes	%	Elected?	
Candidate A1	Party A	3555	36%	3.	Yes
Candidate A2	Party A	3700	37%	1.	Yes
Candidate A3	Party A	3600	36%	2.	Yes
Candidate B1	Party B	2600	26%	4.	
Candidate B2	Party B	2500	25%	5.	
Candidate B3	Party B	2400	24%	6.	
Candidate I1	Independent	2300	23%	8.	
Candidate I2	Independent	2395	20%	7.	
Candidate I3	Independent	1900	19%	9.	
Candidate I4	Independent	1800	15%	10	
Candidate I5	Independent	650	7%	11.	
Candidate I6	Independent	600	6%	12.	
TOTAL		28,000			
TOTAL possible votes (3 per voter)		30,000			
Voters		10,000	100%		

Candidates of Party A won in a landslide, even though they only received a plurality (35–37%) among the voters (10,000). This is because most parties run as many candidates as there are open seats and voters of a party usually do not split their ticket, but vote for all candidates of that party.

By contrast, a single transferable vote system would likely elect 1 candidate from party A, 1 candidate from party B and 1 independent candidate in this scenario.

== Effects of block voting ==
The block voting system has a number of features which can make it unrepresentative of the voters' intentions. Block voting regularly produces complete landslide majorities for the group of candidates with the highest level of support. Additionally, like first past the post methods, if there are many parties running and voters do not engage in tactical voting, a small cohesive group of voters, making up only a minority of the voters, can elect all the open seats by merely constituting a plurality.

=== Landslide victories ===
Under block voting, a slate of clones of the top-place candidate may win every available seat. A voter does have the option to vote for candidates of different political parties if they wish, but if the largest group of voters have strong party loyalty, there is nothing the other voters or parties can do to prevent a landslide.

While many criticize block voting's tendency to create landslide victories, some cite it as a strength. Since the winners of a block voting election generally represent the same slate or group of voters, there is greater agreement among those elected, potentially leading to a reduction in political gridlock.

=== Tactical voting and strategic nomination ===
Block plurality voting, like single-winner plurality voting, is particularly vulnerable to tactical voting. Supporters of relatively unpopular third parties have a substantial incentive to avoid wasted votes by casting all of their votes for a slate of candidates from a major party.

Parties in block voting systems can also benefit from strategic nomination. Coalitions are actively hurt when they have more candidates than there are seats to fill, as vote-splitting will occur. Similarly, a coalition has a substantial incentive to nominate a full slate of candidates, as otherwise supporting voters may cast some of their remaining votes for opposing candidates.

Bullet voting is a strategy in which a voter only votes for a single candidate in an attempt to stop them being beaten by additional choices. Because the voter is essentially wasting a portion of their vote, bullet voting is only a good strategy when the voter has a strong preference for their favorite and is unsure of, and/or indifferent to, the other candidates' relative chances of winning, for example, if the voter supports an independent candidate or a minor party which has only nominated one candidate. Thus, block voting may look like single non-transferable voting.

This system sometimes fosters the creation of an electoral alliance between political parties or groups as opposed to a coalition. This has been the case in the National Assembly of Mauritius; the New Hampshire House of Representatives, with the election of multiple Free State Project as well as New Hampshire Liberty Alliance members; and in the Vermont Senate, with the elections of Vermont Progressive Party members Tim Ashe and Anthony Pollina. Historically, similar situations arose within the multi-member constituencies in the Parliament of the United Kingdom.

== Compared to preferential block voting ==
Block voting, or block plurality voting, is often compared with preferential block voting as both systems tend to produce landslide victories for similar candidates. Instead of a series of checkboxes, preferential block voting uses a preferential ballot. A slate of clones of the top preferred candidate will win every seat under both systems, however in preferential block voting this is instead the instant-runoff winner.

== Vacancies ==
In Brazil, where Senatorial elections alternate between FPTP and block voting, each main candidate is registered along with two substitutes. Votes in either election are cast and counted based on these three-candidate slates; when a Senator leaves office before their eight-year term ends, the first substitute takes their place, and then the second if needed.

On the other hand, in political systems with a culture of by-elections, filling vacancies under Block Voting can be harder than in other voting methods. This is because by-elections to fill a single seat in a multi-member district can be expensive. In the Philippine Senate that has staggered elections, the seat is filled up on the next scheduled election, such as in 1951, 1955 and 2001. In the first two elections, the seat for the vacancy is a separate ballot question, where the voters voted for eight senators, then a separate ninth senator from a separate candidate list. In 2001, it was in one ballot question, where voters voted for 13, instead of 12, senators, all from one candidate list.

There are alternative ways of selecting a replacement in such systems: one way is to fill any seat that becomes empty by appointing the most popular unsuccessful candidate in the last election, i.e. a countback. This was used in the City of Edmonton (Canada) following the 1905 Edmonton municipal election.

== Use of block voting ==
=== National elections ===
Block voting used for electing national legislatures
Block voting (BV) or mixed FPTP and BV
Block voting (BV) or mixed FPTP and BV only for upper house of legislature
Parallel voting mixed BV and party-list PR

The Philippines is the country with the most extensive experience in plurality-at-large voting. Positions where there are multiple winners usually use plurality-at-large voting, the exception is the election for sectoral representatives in the House of Representatives. The members of the Senate and all local legislatures are elected via this method. The members of the Interim Batasang Pambansa (the parliament) were also elected under this method in 1978.

The following countries use block plurality voting (not including party block voting using plurality) in their national electoral systems:

Country	Legislative body	Latest election (year)	Type of system	Seats per constituency	Electoral system	Total seats	Constituencies	Governmental system	Notes
Brazil	Senate	2026	block voting via multi-winner districts	1 or 2 (staggered elections)	Block plurality voting (BV) and First-past-the-post (FPTP/SMP)	81	States and the Federal district	Presidential system	
Islamic Republic of Iran	Islamic Consultative Assembly (Majlis)	2024	block voting via multi-winner districts	1–30	Modified two-round block voting (BV) in multi-member districts, modified two-round system (TRS) in single-member districts (25% of votes required to win in 1st round in every constituency)	290 (285 directly elected)	electoral districts	Presidential system	
Islamic Republic of Iran	Assembly of Experts	2024	block voting via multi-winner districts	1–16	Block plurality voting (BV)	88		Presidential system	
Kiribati	House of Assembly	2024	block voting via multi-winner districts	1–3	Two-round block voting (BV) in multi-member districts, two-round system (TRS) in single-member districts (50% of votes required to win in 1st round in every constituency)	46 (44 directly elected + 1 delegate from Banaba Island and 1 ex officio)	electoral districts		
Laos	National Assembly	2026	block voting via multi-winner districts	5–19	Block plurality voting (BV)	164 (149 directly elected)	provinces		
Mali	National Assembly	2020	block voting via multi-winner districts	1-5	Two-round block voting (BV) in multi-member districts, two-round system (TRS) in single-member districts (50% of votes required to win in 1st round in every constituency)	147	electoral districts		
Marshall Islands	Legislature	2023	block voting via multi-winner districts	1–5	First-past-the-post (FPTP/SMP) in single-member constituencies (19 seats) and Block plurality voting (BV) in multi-member constituencies (14 seats)	33	electoral districts		
Mauritania	National Assembly	2023	mixed-member majoritarian	1–3 (local districts), 40 (nationwide constituency)	Coexistence+superposition (parallel) supermixed/hybrid: Two-round system (TRS) in single-member districts, two-round block voting (BV) in dual-member districts, and List PR (simple quota largest remainder; closed-list) in larger districts + twice 20 nationally List PR (one set of 20 reserved for women)	157	electoral districts	Semi-presidential system	
Mauritius	National Assembly	2024	block voting via multi-winner districts	3 (for 20 constituencies) and 2 (for the constituency of Rodrigues)	Block plurality voting (BV)	70 (62 directly elected + a maximum of 8 Best Losers appointed)	electoral districts	Parliamentary system	
Monaco	National Council	2023	mixed-member majoritarian	24	Superposition / Mixed-member majoritarian (MMM) using a single (panachage) ballot: Block plurality voting (BV) in single nationwide constituency for 16 seats; D'Hondt method (8 seats)	24	single nationwide constituency	Parliamentary system	
Mongolia	State Great Assembly (Khural)	2024	block voting via multi-winner districts	1–5	Two round block plurality voting (BV) candidates have to get at least 28% of the votes in a district to get elected. If there are unfilled seat, a runoff is held with twice the number of candidates as there are unfilled seats	76	electoral districts	Semi-presidential system	
Realm of New Zealand	Niue Assembly	2023	block voting via multi-winner districts	1 (local districts), 6 (nationwide constituency)	Parallel voting / superposition: First-past-the-post (FPTP/SMP) 14 seats + Block plurality voting 6 seats	20			
Oman	Consultative Assembly	2023	block voting via multi-winner districts	1–2	First-past-the-post (FPTP/SMP) in single-member districts and Block plurality voting (BV) in two-seat districts	86	electoral districts		
Palau	Senate	2024	single-winner districts	13	Block plurality voting (BV)	13	single nationwide constituency	Presidential system	
Philippines	Senate	2025	block voting at-large	12 (staggered elections)	Block plurality voting (BV)	24	single nationwide constituency	Presidential system	
Switzerland	Council of States All cantons, except: (Canton of Jura) Jura; (Canton of Neuchâtel) Neuchâtel	2023	block voting via multi-winner districts	1–2	One-round (plurality) or two-round (majority) block voting	46	Cantons		
Tuvalu	Parliament	2024	block voting via multi-winner districts	2	Block plurality voting (BV)	16	electoral districts	Parliamentary system	
(United Kingdom) Crown dependencies and British Overseas territories	Anguilla House of Assembly	2025	single-winner districts	1 (local districts), 4 (nationwide constituency)	Majoritarian parallel voting / superposition: First-past-the-post (FPTP/SMP) in local constituencies + Block plurality voting (BV) nationwide	13 (Including 2 ex officio)	electoral districts and a single nationwide constituency	Parliamentary system	
(United Kingdom) Crown dependencies and British Overseas territories	Falkland Islands Legislative Assembly	2025	block voting via multi-winner districts	3–5	Block plurality voting (BV)	8	Stanley constituency and Camp constituency	Parliamentary system	
(United Kingdom) Crown dependencies and British Overseas territories	Guernsey States of Deliberation	2025	block voting at-large	38	Block plurality voting, each voter has up to 38 votes	40 (38 directly elected)	single nationwide constituency	Parliamentary system	
(United Kingdom) Crown dependencies and British Overseas territories	Isle of Man House of Keys	2026	block voting via multi-winner districts	2	Block plurality voting (BV)	24	12 constituencies, partly based on historical parishes	Parliamentary system	
(United Kingdom) Crown dependencies and British Overseas territories	Jersey States Assembly	2026	block voting via multi-winner districts	1–4 (local districts), 4 (nationwide constituency)	Majoritarian parallel voting / superposition: First-past-the-post (FPTP/SMP) in single-member districts, Block plurality voting (BV) in multi-member districts seats + Block plurality voting (BV) nationwide	49	electoral districts and a single nationwide constituency	Parliamentary system	
(United Kingdom) Crown dependencies and British Overseas territories	(Montserrat) Montserrat Legislative Assembly	2024	block voting at-large	9	Block plurality voting, each voter has up to 9 votes	11 (9 directly elected)	single nationwide constituency	Parliamentary system	
(United Kingdom) Crown dependencies and British Overseas territories	(Saint Helena) Saint Helena Legislative Council	2025	block voting at-large	12	Block plurality voting, each voter has up to 12 votes	15 (12 directly elected)	single nationwide constituency	Parliamentary system	
(United Kingdom) Crown dependencies and British Overseas territories	(Turks and Caicos Islands) Turks and Caicos Islands Parliament	2025	block voting via multi-winner districts	1 (local districts), 9 (nationwide constituency)	Majoritarian parallel voting / superposition: First-past-the-post (FPTP/SMP) in single-member districts + Block plurality voting (BV) nationwide	21 (19 directly elected)	electoral districts and a single nationwide constituency	Parliamentary system	
(United Kingdom) Crown dependencies and British Overseas territories	(British Virgin Islands) British Virgin Islands House of Assembly	2023	single-winner districts	1 (local districts), 4 (nationwide constituency)	Majoritarian parallel voting / superposition: First-past-the-post (FPTP/SMP) in single-member districts + Block plurality voting (BV) nationwide	13	electoral districts and a single nationwide constituency	Parliamentary system	

=== Sub-national elections ===
Other countries using block voting:

- Canada, in many local government elections, and in Senate nominee elections in Alberta
- China for the National People's Congress and local people's congresses in provincial, municipal and regional levels with combined approval voting
- Ecuador in 1998
- Hungary, for local elections in municipalities under 10,000 residents. The system is officially called "individualized list electoral system" or "electoral system using personalized lists" (Hungarian: egyéni listás választási rendszer), which can be loosely interpreted as meaning personalized block voting, as opposed to party list systems, such as party block voting (general ticket) or party list PR.
- Iran, for the city and village councils
- Lebanon
- Malaysia, for most university-level campus elections.
- New Zealand, for some local elections which use a first past the post system for multi-member wards
- Philippines, for provincial boards, and city, municipal and village councils
- Russia, in some local elections, e.g. in Moscow district councils elections
- Syria
- Tonga, for noble elections
- United Kingdom, in some local elections in England and Wales.
- United States, in some state and local elections.

In France, the election of municipal councilors takes place by majority vote plurinominal, in two rounds with panachage:

- In the first round, candidates are elected if they receive an absolute majority of votes cast and the vote of a quorum of at least a quarter of registered voters;
- In the second round, a simple majority suffices. If multiple candidates receive the same number of votes, the election is won by the older of the candidates when no one can be elected based on the number of seats

In British Columbia, Canada, all local governments are elected using bloc voting for city councils and for other multi-member bodies (there called "at-large" voting). In other Canadian provinces, smaller cities are generally elected under plurality-at-large, while larger cities are generally elected under the "ward system" which is a municipal adaptation of single member plurality. The sole exception is London, Ontario which has recently changed to the Alternative Vote. When Toronto was amalgamated in 1997, the new entity's first election used a similar rule. From 1871 to 1988, British Columbia had some multi-member ridings using plurality-at-large, and others elected under single member plurality, with the number of each varying from one election to the next. Other Canadian provincial legislatures have in the past used plurality-at-large or single transferable vote, but now all members of provincial legislatures are exclusively elected under single-member plurality.

In Hong Kong, block voting is used for a tiny proportion of the territory's population to elect the members of the Election Committee, which is responsible for selecting the territory's Chief Executive.

=== Former use ===
Block voting was used in the Australian Senate from 1901 to 1948 (from 1918, this was preferential block voting). Block voting was also once used in South Australia. It was used for multi-member constituencies in parliamentary elections in the United Kingdom until their abolition, and remains in use throughout England and Wales for some local elections. It is also used in Jersey, Guernsey, the Isle of Man, the Cayman Islands (until 2013, FPTP since 2017), the Falkland Islands and Saint Helena.

Block plurality voting is or was also used in the election of the Senate of Poland (until 2011), the Argentine Chamber of Deputies (between 1854 and 1902, and between 1906 and 1910), of the Parliament of Lebanon, the plurality seats in the Palestinian Legislative Council and for the National Assembly of Mauritius. In some Lebanese and Palestinian constituencies, there is only one seat to be filled; in the Palestinian election of 1996 there were only plurality seats, but in 2006 half the seats were elected by plurality (two by first past the post; the others by block voting, in districts that ranged in size from two to nine seats); half by proportional representation nationwide. (The usual one-party sweep produced by block voting is seen in Hebron in the 2006 election where one party took all the district's nine seats.)

A form of block plurality voting was used for the elections of both houses of Parliament in Belgium before proportional representation was implemented in 1900. The system, however, was combined with a system similar to a runoff election; when not enough candidates had the majority of the votes in the first round to fill the seats, a second round was held between the highest ranked candidates of the first round (with two times as many candidates as seats to be filled). In some constituencies there was only one seat to be filled. A similar system to elect part of the Mongolian parliament. 48 Representatives are elected from districts with 1–3 members, the representatives are required to achieve at least 28% of the vote in a district to be elected, if there are unfilled seats after the first round of voting, a second round similar to the Belgian system is held to fill the remaining seat. The remaining representatives are elected separately using party list proportional representation on the national level.

Block voting was used in some constituencies for the House of Representatives of Japan in the first six general elections between 1890 and 1898: while the majority of seats was elected by plurality in 214 single-member districts, there were 43 two-member districts that elected their representatives by block voting.

== See also ==
- Voting bloc
- Single non-transferable vote
- Block approval voting
- Municipal elections in France
