= Julie Thomas (politician) =

Chief Minister of Saint Helena

The Honourable Julie Thomas MLC

1st Chief Minister of Saint Helena
- In office 25 October 2021 – 10 September 2025
- Monarchs: Elizabeth II; Charles III
- Governor: Philip Rushbrook; Nigel Phillips
- Preceded by: Office established
- Succeeded by: Rebecca Cairns-Wicks

Minister for Education, Skills and Employment
- Incumbent
- Assumed office 1 November 2021
- Preceded by: Office established

Personal details
- Born: Julie Dorne Thomas Saint Helena
- Occupation: Politician

Julie Dorne Thomas is a politician from Saint Helena who served as the island's inaugural Chief Minister from October 2021 to September 2025. She currently serves as Minister for Education, Skills and Employment and as a member of the Legislative Council.

Prior to politics, Thomas worked in the fisheries sector.

== Early life ==
Thomas was born and raised on Saint Helena. Thomas worked in the United Kingdom and has travelled to the United States, South Africa, and Ascension Island.

== Career ==
Thomas was appointed as a member of the St Helena Fisheries Corporation Board of Management on 9 January 2019. She was also a member of the executive committee of the St Helena Commercial Fishermen's Association (SHCFA) and the International Pole & Line Foundation (IPNLF)'s Project Manager on St Helena.

In the 2021 Saint Helena general election, Thomas received the most votes out of all candidates to the Legislative Council with 888 votes. Thomas was subsequently elected as the first Chief Minister of Saint Helena on 25 October 2021. She was also appointed as Minister for Education, Skills and Employment on 1 November 2021.

Under Thomas' government, improvements were made in internet services, but the island did not receive full fibre internet connection that many had hoped for. The introduction of ophthalmology and audiology services, along with advancements in preventative care, were also notable achievements. In education, the government supported the introduction of the COBIS framework to address declining standards and improve outcomes.

Following the dissolution of Thomas' government in June 2025, Liam Yon of The Sentinel reported that opinions on her tenure were divided. While there was recognition of the improvements in education and healthcare, there were also criticisms regarding telecommunications and fisheries.

She was replaced by Rebecca Cairns-Wicks as Chief Minister following the 2025 Saint Helena general election.

== Personal life ==
Thomas is married to a fisherman and is a mother.

== See also ==
- List of first women governors and chief ministers
- List of female constituent and dependent territory leaders

Political offices
Preceded by New Office	Chief Minister of Saint Helena; 2021–2025	Succeeded by Rebecca Cairns-Wicks
