= Godly Play =

Montessori method for Christian education

Godly Play is a Montessori method for Christian education. The method has been utilized in churches around the world.

== Founding ==
The method was developed by Jerome Berryman, an Episcopal priest. Berryman had studied the Montessori method in Italy, and had been trained in The Catechesis of the Good Shepherd. Berryman sought to develop something similar, suitable for a Protestant audience, incorporating existentialist theological concerns.

Berryman and his colleague Sonja Stewart, a professor of Christian education at Western Theological Seminary, co-developed a series of lessons plans, the first of which were published in the book Young Children and Worship. Berryman then further developed these ideas into the Godly Play method. The lesson plans were published as a series of books.

Teachers are expected to be trained—and, ideally, certified—in the Godly Play method, in order to teach Godly Play. Some of the first Godly Play trainings were held on the campus of Virginia Theological Seminary.

Although there are apparent similarities in methodology and praxis, there are also key methodological and theological differences between the Catechesis of the Good Shepherd and Godly Play.

== Method ==
As with the Montessori method, the Godly Play method is child-centered and hands-on. Led by trained teachers, children are guided through a series of lessons which teach the Bible, the church year, and the saints. The aim is to tap into the imagination and the religious potential of the child, as well as to attend to the child's existential limits.

Berryman said, "[a]t the heart of each lesson is storytelling and wondering". The lessons are taught as stories, illustrated with hands-on materials, which are followed by "I wonder" questions, then by time for students to creatively respond. Essential to the method is "the idea that children have an innate sense of God", but "only lack the language to express their spirituality"; Godly Play aims to address this lack, by providing the language, without interfering with the child's natural instincts.

The curriculum is taught in a classroom, which is specially prepared. Children are divided by age groups; each age group meets in a separate classroom, and is taught lessons in a scope and sequence tailored to their age group.

== Research ==
Work has been done to study Godly Play method and its impact through research and investigation. One collection of said studies is Godly Play — Gott im Spiel, edited by Martin Steinhäuser and Rune Oystese.

== Derivatives ==
The method has inspired several derivatives, among them: Faith & Play Stories, for Quakers; and Spirit Play, for Unitarian Universalists.
