= Olga Boettcher =

Chilean politician

Olga Boettcher (1907-2002) was a politician who served as the first woman Governor in Chile. She became Governor of La Unión Department in 1941.

This was only six years after the introduction of women's suffrage in Chile on municipal level, and eight years before suffrage on national level.
