= Dalva Figueiredo =

Brazilian politician

The Honourable Dalva Figueiredo
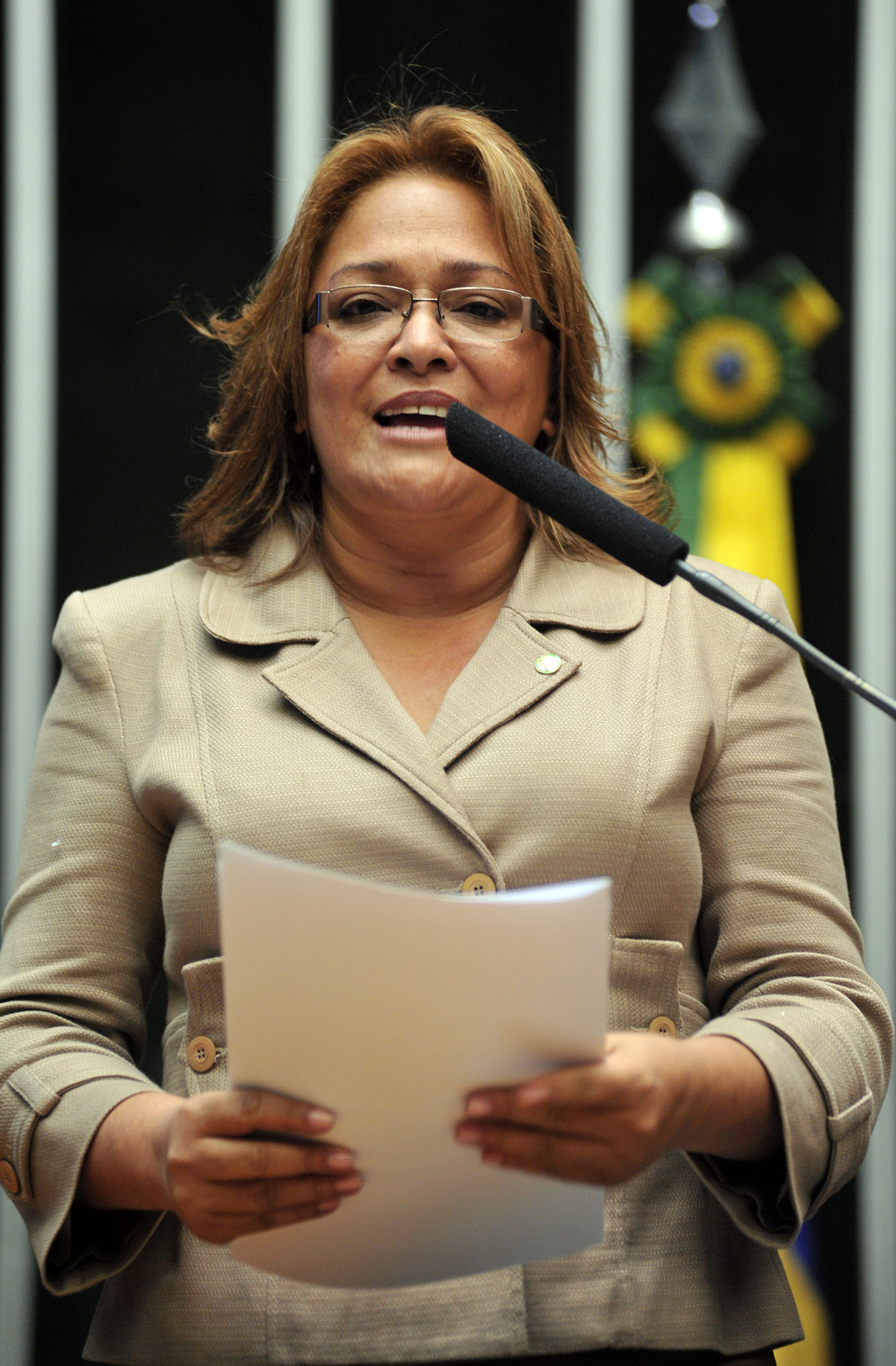

Governor of Amapa
- In office 5 April 2002 – 1 January 2003
- Preceded by: João Capiberibe
- Succeeded by: Waldez Góes

Maria Dalva de Souza Figueiredo known as Dalva Figueiredo is a Brazilian politician. She was the Governor of Amapá.
