= 2025 Saint Helena general election =

- 3 September 2025

All 12 seats in the Legislative Council 7 seats needed for a majority
- Turnout: 56.39% (▼3.79pp)
Chief Minister before election
Julie Thomas
Independent
Elected Chief Minister
Rebecca Cairns-Wicks
Independent

General elections were held in Saint Helena on 3 September 2025.

== Electoral system ==
The 12 seats in the Legislative Council are elected by plurality-at-large voting, with voters allowed to cast up to 12 votes. There are no registered political parties, so all candidates ran as independents. The election was observed by a team from the Commonwealth Parliamentary Association which included Gibraltar's Minister for Industrial Relations, Leslie Bruzon.

== Results ==
Candidate	Votes	%	Notes
Rebecca Elizabeth Cairns-Wicks	823	71.75	Elected
Andrew James Turner	761	66.35	Re-Elected
Corinda Sebastiana Stuart Essex	730	63.64	Re-elected
Karl Gavin Thrower	650	56.67	Re-Elected
Dennis Karl Leo	644	56.15	Elected
Derek Franklin Thomas	629	54.84	Elected
Gillian Ann Brooks	543	47.34	Re-Elected
Martin Dave Henry	541	47.17	Re-Elected
Robert Charles Midwinter	441	38.45	Re-Elected
Clint Richard Beard	407	35.48	Elected
Julie Dorne Thomas	403	35.14	Re-Elected
Ronald Arthur Coleman	389	33.91	Re-Elected
Mark Alan Brooks	352	30.69	Unseated
Anthony Arthur Green	333	29.03	
Jeffrey Robert Ellick	326	28.42	Unseated
Derek Pedley	326	28.42	
Cruyff Gerard Buckley	314	27.38	
Colin Douglas Bargo	309	26.94	
Melissa Kim Fowler	306	26.68	
Cyril Kenneth Leo	217	18.92	
Elizabeth Knipe	174	15.17	
Kevin Adrian Thomas	128	11.16	
Patrick Arthur Williams	59	5.14	
Total	9,805	100.00	
Valid votes	1,147	99.65	
Invalid/blank votes	4	0.35	
Total votes	1,151	100.00	
Registered voters/turnout	2,041	56.39	
