= Rebecca Cairns-Wicks =

Chief Minister of Saint Helena

The Honourable Rebecca Cairns-Wicks
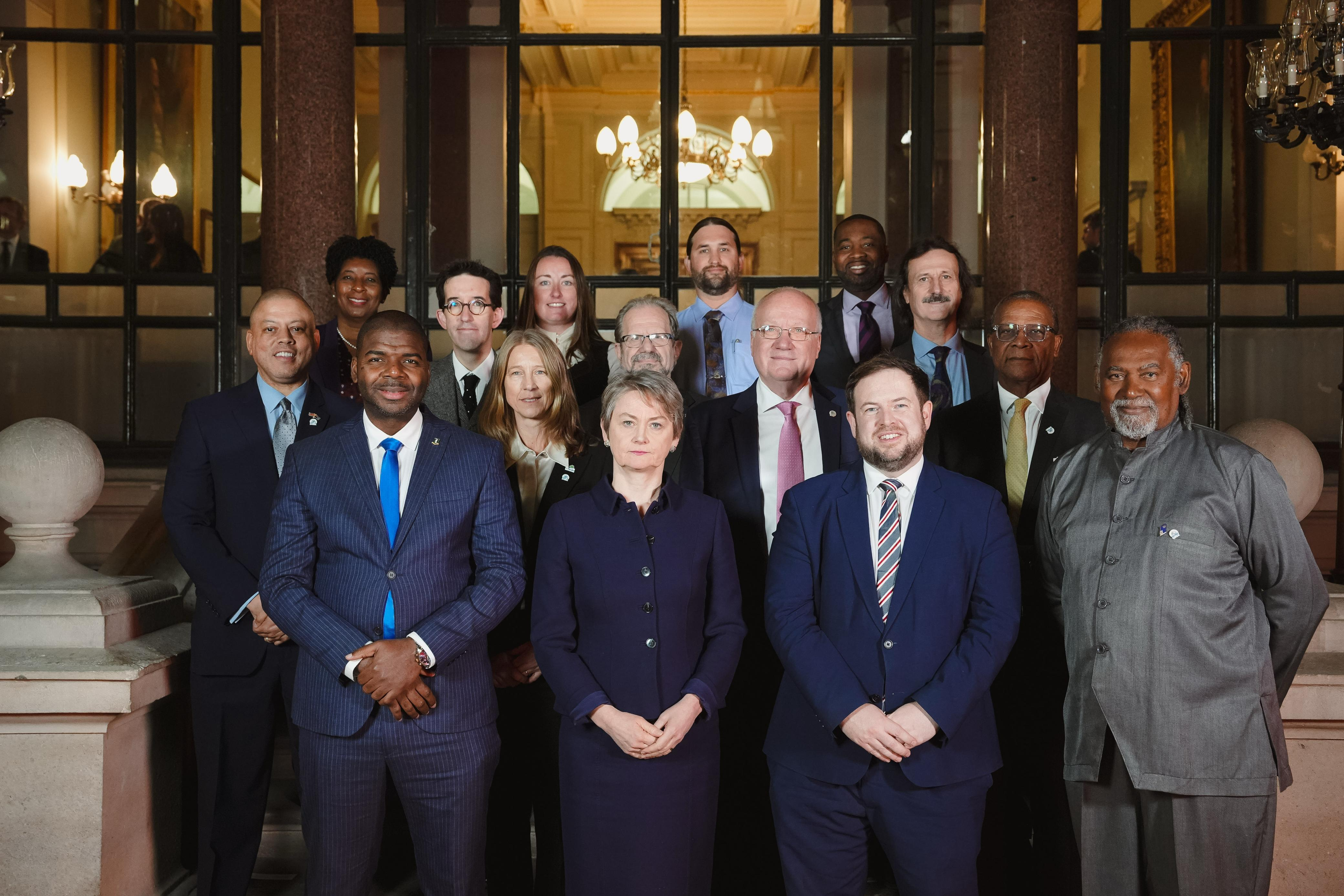
- Cairns-Wicks in 2025

2nd Chief Minister of Saint Helena
- Incumbent
- Assumed office 10 September 2025
- Monarch: Charles III
- Governor: Nigel Phillips
- Preceded by: Julie Thomas

Personal details
- Born: January 1970 England, United Kingdom
- Profession: Politician · conservationist

Rebecca Cairns-Wicks is a Saint Helenian conservationist and politician serving as the Chief Minister of Saint Helena since September 2025.

== Biography ==
Cairns-Wicks is from England and married to a Saint Helenian. She lives in Saint Helena and works as a plant geneticist and conservation scientist, with over 30 years of experience. She served as operations director for the St Helena National Trust. In 2019, she became coordinator for the newly established St Helena Research Institute. For her assistance in introducing lichenologist André Aptroot to the plants and vegetation of Saint Helena, he named the specific epithet of the lichen species Xanthoparmelia beccae after her. In 2025, she wrote an article for the European Journal of Taxonomy on "Diversity of the extinct land snail genus Chilonopsis of St Helena".

Cairns-Wicks entered politics in 2025 by launching a campaign for one of 12 seats to the Legislative Council of Saint Helena, with a platform promoting education and reducing living costs. She was elected with 823 votes or 71.8% of the votes cast, which was the highest number out of all candidates and over 60 more than the second-place candidate. On 10 September 2025, seven days after the general election, she stood for election as Chief Minister of Saint Helena and won the position, succeeding Julie Thomas and becoming the second person to hold the title.
