= Chief Minister of Saint Helena =

Head of the Saint Helena Government

- Coat of arms of Saint Helena

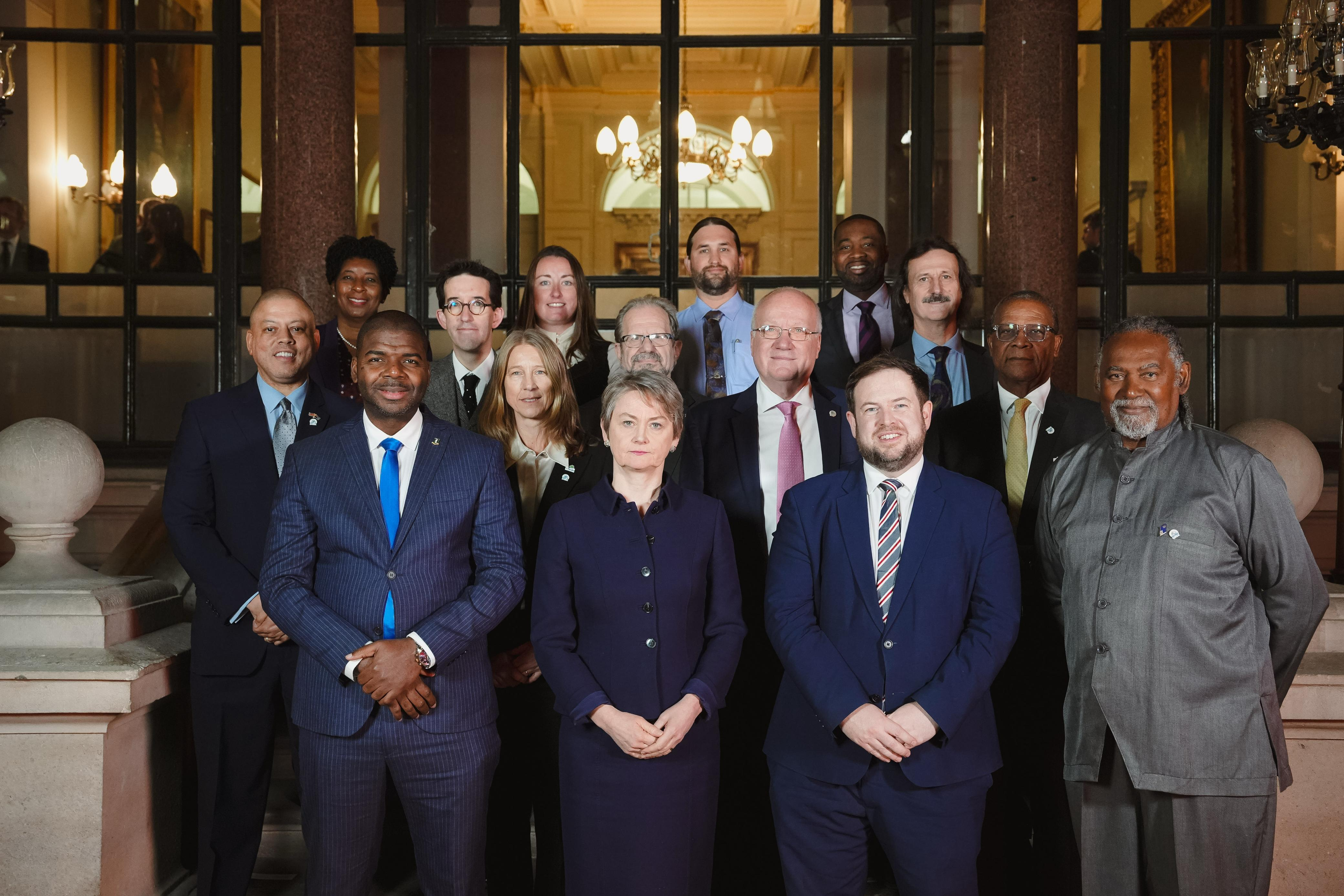
- Incumbent; Rebecca Cairns-Wicks since 10 September 2025
- Style: The Honourable
- Member of: Executive Council
- Seat: Jamestown
- Appointer: Governor of Saint Helena
- Term length: Four years
- Inaugural holder: Julie Thomas
- Formation: 25 October 2021; 4 years ago
- Website: Official website

The Chief Minister of Saint Helena is the head of the Saint Helena Government. The chief minister is elected by the Legislative Council of Saint Helena, and is formally appointed by the Governor of Saint Helena, the representative of the British monarch.

== History ==
Prior to the creation of the Chief Minister, Saint Helena was governed using a committee system under the Governor of Saint Helena that was deemed inadequate for the needs of the territory. The creation of the post was approved following the 2021 Saint Helena governance system referendum. The post of chief minister is the equivalent of a premier or prime minister in other British Overseas Territories. This includes the ability to advise the Governor to dissolve the Legislative Council in order to call a general election. They also have meetings with British ministers responsible for the British Overseas Territories. When the holder is not present in Saint Helena, they may nominate a minister to act as deputy for them.

The inaugural Chief Minister was Julie Thomas, who took office on 25 October 2021. This came after she had been elected by her fellow members of the Legislative Council of Saint Helena, presided over by the Governor exercising his Royal commission from Queen Elizabeth II until a Speaker of the Legislative Council of Saint Helena was elected. The Chief Minister is able to exercise powers to enter Saint Helena into international agreements, as seen when Thomas negotiated an agreement with the British government to take illegal immigrants that landed on the British Indian Ocean Territory in exchange for extra money for Saint Helena. The current Chief Minister is Rebecca Cairns-Wicks, who assumed office on 10 September 2025.

== Chief ministers of Saint Helena (2021–present) ==
| rowspan=2 No. | Portrait | Name (Birth–Death) | Elected | Term of office | | |
| Took office | Portrait | Name (Birth–Death) | Elected | Left office | Time in office | |
|---|---|---|---|---|---|---|
| 1 | | Julie Thomas | 2021 | 25 October 2021 | 10 September 2025 | 3 years, 320 days |
| 2 | | Rebecca Cairns-Wicks | 2025 | 10 September 2025 | Incumbent | 362 days |

== See also ==
- List of current heads of government in the United Kingdom and dependencies
- List of leaders of dependent territories
- Politics of Saint Helena
