= Legislative Council of Saint Helena =

Legislative body

Type
- Type: Unicameral
- Sovereign: Monarch of the United Kingdom

Leadership
- Speaker: Maureen Thompson, Independent since 11 September 2025
- Chief Minister: Rebecca Cairns-Wicks, Independent since 10 September 2025

Structure
- Seats: 15
- Political groups: Speaker & Deputy Speaker (2): Independent (2); Government (5): Independent (5); Official Opposition (7): Independent (7); Ex officio (1) Ex officio (1)

Elections
- Voting system: Plurality block voting (12), ex officio members (1)
- Last election: 3 September 2025

Meeting place
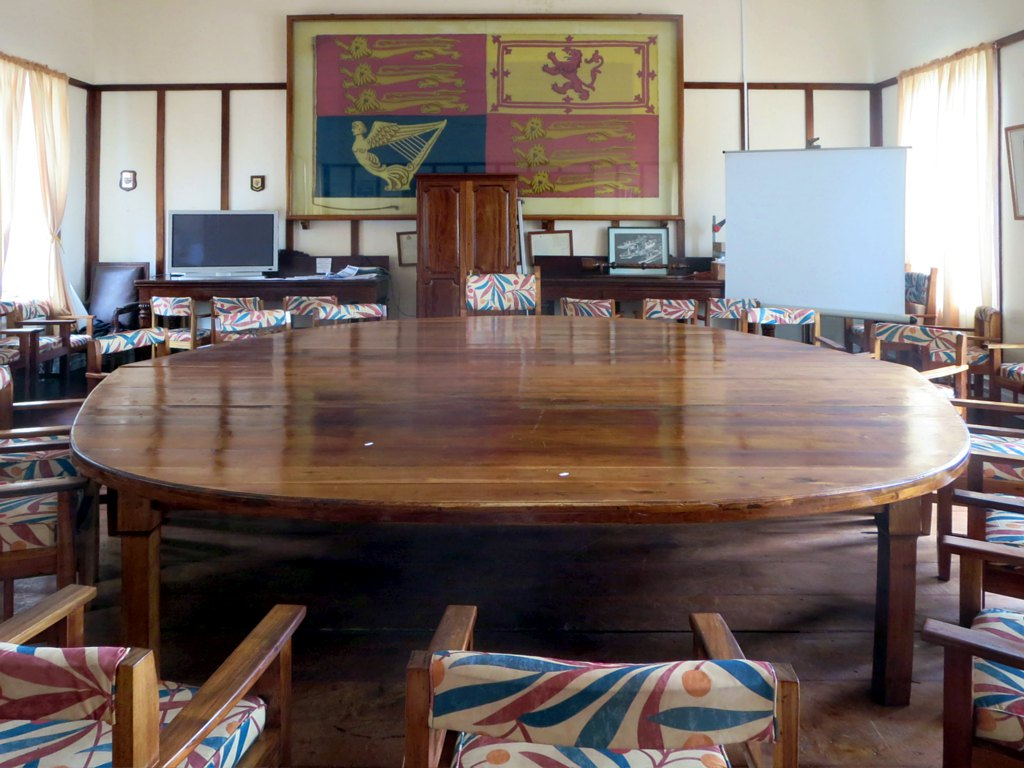
- Council Chamber, The Castle, Jamestown

Website
- www.sainthelena.gov.sh/government/legislative-council/

The Legislative Council of Saint Helena is the unicameral legislature of Saint Helena, a constituent part of the British Overseas Territory of Saint Helena, Ascension and Tristan da Cunha. The council itself is often referred to as "LegCo" by islanders.

The Legislative Council consists of 15 members: 12 elected members who serve a four-year term and are elected by popular vote; a Speaker and Deputy Speaker, chosen by the elected members; and one ex officio member, the Attorney General. Members of the Council use the suffix "MLC" (Member of the Legislative Council), and are sometimes referred to as Councillors.

== Election summary ==
The twelve elected members of the 2025-2029 Legislative Council are:

1. Rebecca Cairns-Wicks (823 votes)
2. Andrew James Turner (761 votes)*
3. Corinda Sebastiana Stuart Essex (730 votes)*
4. Karl Gavin Thrower (611 votes)*
5. Dennis Karl Leo (644 votes)
6. Derek Franklin Thomas (629 votes)
7. Gillian Ann Brooks (543 votes)*
8. Martin Dave Henry (541 votes)*
9. Robert Charles Midwinter (441 votes)
10. Clint Richard Beard (407 votes)
11. Julie Thomas (403 votes)*
12. Ronald Arthur Coleman (389 votes)*

An asterisk (*) denotes a sitting incumbent MLC who was duly re-elected.

== Electoral divisions ==
Saint Helena is divided into eight districts, each with a community centre. The districts also serve as statistical subdivisions and electoral areas. Currently, all twelve elected MLCs represent the entire island as a single constituency. Previously, there were two constituencies (electoral districts) – "the East" and "the West", and each constituency had six Elected Members. Prior to that there were eight constituencies. The four most populated districts (i.e., Half Tree Hollow, Jamestown, Longwood, and St Paul's) each sent two representatives to the Legislative Council. The remaining districts (i.e., Alarm Forest, Blue Hill, Levelwood, and Sandy Bay) sent one representative each.

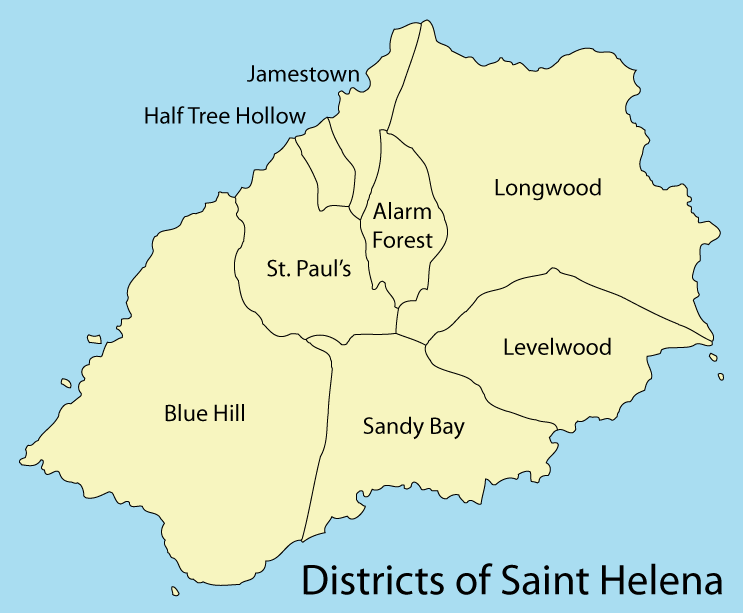
Districts of Saint Helena

Electoral districts of Saint Helena
District	Area	Pop. (1998)	Pop. (2008)	Pop. 2016	Pop. density (km^{2}, 2016)
Alarm Forest	5.4 kilometres (3.4 mi)	289	276	383	70.4
Blue Hill	36.8 kilometres (22.9 mi)	177	153	158	4.3
Half Tree Hollow	1.6 kilometres (0.99 mi)	1,140	901	984	633.2
Jamestown	3.9 kilometres (2.4 mi)	884	716	629	161.9
Levelwood	14.8 kilometres (9.2 mi)	376	316	369	25.0
Longwood	33.4 kilometres (20.8 mi)	960	715	790	23.6
Sandy Bay	16.1 kilometres (10.0 mi)	254	205	193	12.0
Saint Paul's	11.4 kilometres (7.1 mi)	908	795	843	74.0

== Speakers of the Legislative Council ==
- John Wainwright Newman (?–?)
- Eric W. George (?–2008)
- Margaret Anne Catherine Hopkins (2008–2013)
- Eric Benjamin (24 July 2013–2021)
- Cyril Gunnell (25 October 2021–11 September 2025)
- Maureen Thompson (11 September 2025–present)

== See also ==
- Ascension Island Council
- Tristan da Cunha Island Council
