= Administrator of the Pitcairn Islands =

The Administrator of the Pitcairn Islands is the de facto Chair of the Island Council. The officeholder represents the interests of the Governor.

As a British overseas territory the head of state is Charles III, with the Governor of the Pitcairn Islands appointed by the British government to act as his local representative. However, as the Governor of the Pitcairn Islands is also the British High Commissioner to New Zealand and Samoa, an Administrator is appointed as the Governor's representative on the island.

However, Pitcairn is largely autonomous, and most power is exercised not by officials appointed by the British government, but rather by the locally elected Mayor and Island Council.

The first and inaugural Administrator is His Honour Alan Richmond, who took up the office in November 2014. In August 2018 Nicholas Kennedy become the second Administrator.

== List of administrators of the Pitcairn Islands ==
Pitcairn Islands
No.	Name (Birth–Death)	Portrait	Tenure		Notes	Governor of Pitcairn	Monarch
No.	Name (Birth–Death)	Portrait	From	Until	Notes	Governor of Pitcairn	Monarch
1	Alan Richmond (?–?)		November 2014	May 2016		Jonathan Sinclair	Elizabeth II
2	Robin Shackell (?–?)		May 2016	August 2016	Temporary administrator	Jonathan Sinclair	Elizabeth II
3	Nicola Hebb (?–?)		September 2016	August 2018		Jonathan Sinclair	Elizabeth II
3	Nicola Hebb (?–?)		September 2016	August 2018		Laura Clarke	Elizabeth II
4	Nicholas Kennedy (?–?)		August 2018	December 2020		Laura Clarke	Elizabeth II
5	Mark Tomlinson (?–?)		January 2021	February 2022		Laura Clarke	Elizabeth II
6	Alasdair Hamilton (?–?)		February 2022	April 2022		Laura Clarke	Elizabeth II
7	Colin Leeman (?–?)		April 2022	June 2022	Temporary administrator	Iona Thomas	Elizabeth II
8	Stephen Thwaites (?–?)		June 2022	July 2022	Temporary administrator	Iona Thomas	Elizabeth II
9	Tim Moody (?–?)		July 2022	October 2022	Temporary administrator	Iona Thomas	Elizabeth II
10	Simon Bull (?–?)		October 2022	November 2022	Temporary administrator	Iona Thomas	Charles III
11	Steve Townsend (?–?)		December 2022	April 2024	Joint administrators (Job share)	Iona Thomas	Charles III
11	Fiona Kilpatrick (?–?)		December 2022	April 2024	Joint administrators (Job share)	Iona Thomas	Charles III
12	Lindsy Thompson (?–?)		April 2024	July 2025		Iona Thomas	Charles III
13	Rachael Midlen (?–?)		July 2025	Incumbent		Iona Thomas	Charles III
