= Martin J. Goodman =

Martin J. Goodman (born in Leicester in 1956) is an English journalist and writer.

== Early life ==
Martin Goodman went to Loughborough Grammar School. He is Emeritus professor at the University of Hull, where he was Professor of Creative Writing 2009-2019 and Director of the Philip Larkin Centre for Poetry and Creative Writing. Before moving to Hull, Martin Goodman was lecturer in Creative Writing at the University of Plymouth. He completed his PhD in Creative Writing at Lancaster University in 2007.

== Career ==
Martin Goodman writes both fiction and nonfiction. His most recent book of nonfiction is My Head for a Tree, an account of the Bishnoi of India and their religion. His Client Earth, May 2017, from Scribe Publications. tells the story of ecolawyers saving the planet, and was co-written with his husband the environmental lawyer James Thornton. They presented the work at the Sydney Opera House's Antidote Festival in September 2017. They were interviewed about the book on BBC Parliament's BOOKtalk in July 2017. Granta Magazine profiled their life and work together in an interview in July 2017. He is the publisher of Barbican Press. His latest fiction is a first collection of short stories on gay themes, Lessons from Cruising. His most recent novel The Cellist of Dachau takes music and the Holocaust as its themes, Forever Konrad, PS Publishing, 2017 is a vampire novel, set partly in Hull and the nearby village of Cherry Burton.

Martin Goodman once taught on the distance learning MA at Lancaster University, where he worked on the British Council Crossing Borders scheme as a mentor to writers in Kenya and Zimbabwe. Goodman's novel On Bended Knees (Macmillan, 1992) was shortlisted for the Whitbread First Novel Award (won by Jeff Torrington's Swing Hammer Swing).

His next books published were all non-fiction, often on a spiritual theme and published at first in America. He wrote a biography of Mother Meera, In Search of the Divine Mother (1998). His 2001 book I Was Carlos Castaneda recounted his experiences with shamanism and the plant hallucinogen ayahuasca. On Sacred Mountains (2002) is a round-the-world travelogue and journey of spiritual awakening; The Guardian review stated: "Either an important spiritual document, or an admonitory example of the effects of oxygen deprivation."

His next novels were Slippery When Wet (2006), from Transita in Oxford; Look Who's Watching (2011) from Caffeine Nights, and Ectopia (2014) from Barbican Press. He started Barbican Press with the slogan "Writing from the Discomfort Zone", with a list of novels written as PhDs inspired by his being external examiner for D.D. Johnston at the University of Gloucestershire. The first novel published was Johnston's The Deconstruction of Professor Thrub.

He was one of the AHRC / BBC New Generation Thinkers in 2012–13. 2014 saw BBC Radio 4 broadcast his documentary on the writer Alan Garner, The Bronze Age Man of Jodrell Bank His two-part Radio 4 series show The New North aired in 2013 and he wrote about the buildings in the North of England in the BBC online news magazine. Martin Goodman gave a reading from his new novel on vampires at the Bram Stoker Birthday Conference in Whitby in November 2013. This was published as Forever Konrad: A Vampire's Vampire in November 2017. As Director of the Philip Larkin Centre he ran major public interview sessions in Hull with writers such as Hilary Mantel, Steven Saylor, Christopher Hampton, Emma Thompson, Irene Sabatini, Kate Mosse, David Almond, Lachlan Mackinnon, Edna O'Brien. He started the Annual Children's Writing Event in Hull, working first of all with Emma Thompson and the Hull Children's Flood Project and then with David Almond hosted by students of Sidney Smith School and Malorie Blackman, who wrote the introduction to a book of resulting stories by Hull children.

In 2011 he joined the Man Booker Prize Foundation University Initiative, bringing D.B.C. Pierre to Hull to speak about his 2003 novel Vernon God Little, after distributing a copy of the book to all first-year students at Hull and on film at Scarborough. Julian Barnes was his Man Booker guest in 2013.

== Awards ==
Client Earth, written jointly with his husband James Thornton (environmentalist), was Winner of the Judge's Choice, Business Book of the Year in the Business Book of the Year Awards, 2018 and the Santa Monica Public Library's Green Prize for sustainable Literature 2019. For his biography of the Scottish scientist and serial self-experimenter John Scott Haldane, Suffer and Survive, he won 1st Prize, Basis of Medicine in the 2008 BMA Book Awards Martin Goodman has been awarded a Scottish Arts Council Writer's Bursary, and Travel Awards from the Scottish Arts Council and the Society of Authors. His first novel On Bended Knees was shortlisted for the Whitbread Prize. He was awarded a British Academy Small Research Grant in 2010 for a biography of Taezan Maezumi Roshi. His play Feeding the Roses won in Virtual Theatre's "Pen is a Mighty Sword" international playwriting competition in 2007, for "innovative plays that question the status quo and shed light on today's challenges". A major two-year research grant, from the MacIntosh Foundation of Washington DC, USA, funded a life-writing project (2013–15), detailing how a group of public interest lawyers are working throughout Europe and West Africa to tackle urgent environmental issues such as loss of biodiversity and climate change. This was published in the UK and Australia as Client Earth in 2017, with sections by James Thornton interleaving Goodman's narrative.
