= 2025 Pitcairnese general election =

Elections in the Pitcairn Islands

General elections were held in the Pitcairn Islands on 5 November 2025 to elect the mayor and members of the Island Council. Shawn Christian was elected as mayor and Charlene Warren-Peu as deputy mayor, while Michele Christian, Torika Christian, Melva Evans, Shirley Young and outgoing mayor Simon Young were elected to the Island Council.
