= Thelma Brown =

Pitcairnese politician (1928–2001)

Member of the Island Council
- In office 1974–1985, 1987

Personal details
- Born: 21 November 1928; Pitcairn Island
- Died: August 2001 (aged 72); Pitcairn Island

Thelma Adella Brown (21 November 1928 – August 2001) was a Pitcairnese politician. In 1973 she and Carol Christian were elected to the Island Council, becoming its first female members.

== Biography ==
Brown was born Thelma Adella Christian on 21 November 1928, the daughter of Flora Clarice Christian. She married Len Carlyle Brown, with whom she had five children between 1953 and 1959.

In 1973 she stood for election to the Island Council, and was elected unopposed, becoming one of the first female members of the Island Council alongside Carol Christian. She was re-elected every year until 1985, and then again in 1986.

She is the mother-in-law of Steve Christian and the grandmother of Shawn Christian.

Brown was featured on a set of Pitcairn stamps on weaving.

She died in August 2001 at the age of 72.
