= ClientEarth =

International environmental law charity

- Formation: 2008; 18 years ago
- Founder: James Thornton
- Purpose: Law, environmentalism
- Headquarters: London
- Location: London, Brussels, Warsaw, Berlin, Madrid, Beijing, Tokyo
- CEO: Laura Clarke
- Website: www.clientearth.org

ClientEarth is an environmental law charity, with offices in London, Brussels, Warsaw, Berlin, Beijing, Madrid and Tokyo. It was founded in 2008 by James Thornton and the organisation's CEO is Laura Clarke. As lawyers and environmental experts, they use the law to hold governments and other companies to account over climate change, nature loss, and pollution.

In 2012 BusinessGreen gave ClientEarth its NGO of the Year award. In 2013 ClientEarth was awarded the Law Society's LSA Award for Excellence in Environmental Responsibility.

In 2017, ClientEarth was named the most effective environmental group by green leaders.

== History ==
ClientEarth was founded in 2007 in London. Since its inception, the charity has won major legal landmark victories, and increasingly becoming a global operation. ClientEarth expanded operations to Brussels in 2008 and to Poland shortly thereafter. Throughout the 2010s, it added branch offices in China and Spain, an entity in Luxembourg and then another in Berlin. More recently, in the 2020s, ClientEarth formed a UK Trading Company, as well as a Japanese and an Australian wholly-owned subsidiary.

ClienEarth is also known as the ClientEarth Group, composed of ClientEarth UK and all of its branches, subsidiaries, and financially consolidated entities. It does not include ClientEarth Americas, which is a legally and financially independent 501(c)(3) organization (non-profit) and public interest law firm.

== Activities and campaigns ==
=== Access to justice ===
ClientEarth is attempting to make it a legal right for European citizens and non-governmental organisations (NGOs) to bring environmental cases to court. In 2010, ClientEarth were successful in a legal challenge to get British courts to accept the Aarhus Convention; this convention obliges governments to give rights and remove financial barriers to NGOs and individuals to mount legal challenges to cases of environmental damage. In 2011, ClientEarth announced the launch of its European Aarhus Centre. It provides citizens and non-governmental organisations with the legal expertise necessary to improve access to information and justice in the EU.

=== Air pollution ===
In July 2011, ClientEarth submitted a case to the High Court of Justice of England and Wales, challenging Defra on its failure to protect British citizens' health from the harmful impacts of air pollution.

ClientEarth lawyers insisted not enough was being done after the UK breached EU limits for nitrogen dioxide. In 2015 ClientEarth won the case. In total ClientEarth has won three High Court rulings ordering the British government to produce stronger plans to improve air quality. The third judgment against the Environment Secretary and Transport Secretary forced urgent changes to British government policy on air quality.

In 2019, analysis by ClientEarth showed that 83% of British areas failed to comply with EU legal limits. ClientEarth continue to lobby the British government to do everything possible to meet air pollution legal limits quickly.

ClientEarth also work on tackling air pollution across Europe. ClientEarth have brought nearly 40 legal actions in Germany over breaches of air pollution law. In 2015 along with partner organisation Deutsche Umwelthilfe ClientEarth brought legal action over illegal nitrogen dioxide levels in Munich. Following their legal action, the EU's top court has issued multiple €10,000 fines to the Bavarian government for failing to act on the ruling. In 2019, the Court of Justice of the European Union ruled that the German authorities refusal to follow court orders is a breach of fundamental human rights and German ministers could face prison.

In 2016, ClientEarth brought a case against the Brussels regional government for a failure to tackle illegal levels of air pollution. They brought the case on behalf of a group of residents in Brussels. The case went to the European Court of Justice who ruled that citizens in Brussels have the right to go to court to challenge how authorities monitor air pollution.

In 2017, ClientEarth launched legal action against Lombardy, Europe's most polluted region to force the authorities to tackle the public health emergency.

=== Agrofuels ===
Along with three other environmental groups (Transport and Environment, the European Environmental Bureau and BirdLife International), ClientEarth filed a lawsuit against the European Commission in March 2010. The groups sued the commission for not releasing important documents concerning biofuels in line with transparency rules.

In September of the same year, the four groups filed a second lawsuit against the commission, to attempt to gain the release of documentation regarding the negative environmental impact of biofuels. Despite speculation that biofuels would create more climate-warming emissions than petrol or diesel, a Commission-funded study had suggested that EU biofuel policy would reduce carbon emissions; however, this conclusion was subsequently shown to be based on flawed assumptions chosen by the commission.

=== Coal industry ===
ClientEarth have taken over 75 legal interventions against coal across ten countries. Their work focuses on using the law to close coal plants or stop new coal plants being built. Their key successes include:

Bełchatów, Poland Bełchatów Coal Mine is Europe's largest coal plant and its carbon emissions are equivalent to those of the whole of New Zealand. ClientEarth took a legal challenge to eliminate the plant's carbon footprint by 2035. Their lawsuit demands the plant operators, state-owned power giant Polska Grupa Energetyczna, stop burning lignite or take measures to eliminate the plant's carbon emissions, by 2035. ClientEarth is also challenging the operation of two neighbouring opencast mines, arguing that lignite mining causes significant disturbance to groundwater levels and releases toxic heavy metals into surrounding water and soil.

Północ, Pelplin, Poland In 2011, ClientEarth challenged plans by company Polenergia had planned to construct a 1.6 GW coal power plant, called Północ (English: North), near Pelplin. The plant would have been the largest new installation of its kind in the EU emitting 8 million tons of CO_{2} a year. The permit for the plant ignored glaring environmental issues. Following a complaint by ClientEarth's environmental lawyers and a multi-year legal battle, Poland's Supreme Administrative Court ruled that the Północ coal plant will never be built.

Ostrołęka C, Poland In October 2018, ClientEarth filed a challenge against Enea over financial risks to investors amid rising carbon prices, cheaper renewables and EU reforms on state subsidies for coal power plants. The courts ruled in August 2019 that the decision to proceed with the project had never been valid. In a separate decision, the courts demanded that the company publish documents that would explain how the plant would be profitable. ClientEarth won this case too against the project's sponsors. In February 2020 Polish authorities announced they will suspend funding to the country's last planned new coal plant, Ostrołęka C. ClientEarth hailed it "the end for new coal" in Europe.

Rovinari, Romania In 2019, ClientEarth submitted a legal challenge against the permit for a coal-fired power plant in Rovinari, a town in southwestern Romania. The plant ranks among Europe's worst for its impact on human health. Rovinari is upstream from an EU nature protection site that contains dozens of threatened habitats and species. ClientEarth's legal challenge asserts that the regional authority did not assess the plant's environmental, climate or health impacts.

Meliti I and II, Greece ClientEarth launched a legal challenge that sought to revoke a permit for two coal-fired power plants in Greece – Meliti I and its sister plant Meliti II. ClientEarth asserted that Greece did not carry out an environmental impact assessment on the plant's impact on health, the environment or the climate, breaching EU laws. In January 2020 the Greek Council of State cancelled the permits. The ruling means that Meliti II will not proceed while the existing unit will require a fresh permit to continue operation.

==== State aid ====
Along with Greenpeace, WWF, Spanish energy companies and the regional authority of Galicia, ClientEarth has intervened regarding the European Commission's decision to approve subsidies to the Spanish coal industry. The approved plan gives preferential access to the wholesale electricity market in Spain for power plants that run on domestic coal. Spanish electricity utilities, including Gas Natural, Iberdrola and Endesa have claimed that this will force them to withdraw from contracts for cheaper imported coal and buy more expensive, lower-quality domestic coal, while the parties have also argued that the decision breaches European laws on state aid and the environment, and that the Spanish government aid will unfairly skew the European energy market. ClientEarth also expressed concern that, if the decision was allowed to stand, other countries may be tempted to use similar tactics to bolster their coal sectors. They and the other environmental groups rejected Spain's position that it was attempting to protect the nation's energy security, arguing that the country has an oversupply of natural gas and, at times, renewable energy.

In 2015 ClientEarth on behalf of Greenpeace Energy attempted to sue the European Commission over approving state aid for the nuclear power plant Hinkley Point C "as a potential competitor on the energy market". The European Court of Justice eventually denied Greenpeace Energy's request as inadmissible in 2017. Greenpeace Energy at that time was primarily trading fossil gas under marketing brand of "eco biogas" even though actual biogas only made 1% of the gas sold.

=== Company reporting ===
ClientEarth brings legal interventions designed to integrate climate-related financial risks into corporate and financial decision making.

In February 2020 their CEO James Thornton wrote a letter to Barclays' chairman warning of the risks associated with continuing to invest in fossil fuels. The letter urged the bank's chairman to toughen the lender's rules on the energy industry.

ClientEarth also provided support to the Church Commissioners for England's call for commodities giant Glencore to significantly strengthen its commitment to combat climate change. In February 2019 Glencore announced it has agreed to align its business and investments with the goals of the Paris Agreement on climate change.

In 2018, ClientEarth lawyers reported Easyjet, Balfour Beatty, EnQuest and Bodycote to the Financial Reporting Council following concerns that they failed to address climate change threats in their reports to shareholders. In August 2018 ClientEarth reported three large British insurance companies – Lancashire, Admiral and Phoenix – to the Financial Conduct Authority for failing to explain the risks from climate change. They called for the Financial Conduct Authority to fine the three companies and compel them to publish more information.

ClientEarth have written to the Financial Reporting Review Panel asking that they properly enforce the Companies Act, the law regarding company reporting of environmental and social issues. ClientEarth charge that such reports often do not adequately consider risks and impacts in these areas, and have proposed an overhaul of the law for when the Act is reviewed.

In July 2010, ClientEarth made a specific complaint regarding mining company Rio Tinto, arguing that statements in the company's annual reports contradicted accounts from other sources including government agencies, NGOs and journalists. ClientEarth argued that, if verified, Rio Tinto's reports would not comply with British law.

=== Marine protection ===
In 2008, ClientEarth sued the French government for failing to enforce a ban on drift net fishing, but the claim was rejected by the French court in Paris. The court also declined a later request for an emergency order, that would have forced the government to intervene.

An investigation by ClientEarth in 2010 found that 32 of 100 fish product labels at nine supermarkets had unverified or misleading claims on sustainability or protection of the marine environment, such as "dolphin-friendly". In addition, the organisation expressed concern that labels often did not make clear that many fish products came from threatened stocks, or that they were caught using techniques that had potential to damage the environment or other species. ClientEarth called for supermarkets to remove or correct these labels, or risk breaching consumer protection laws.

In 2010, ClientEarth voiced its opposition to the EU's potential to force its member states' abstention from a vote regarding the introduction of whaling quotas. The EU had changed whale protection's categorisation from a conservation issue to a fisheries issue, which it believed would allow the forced abstention if the member states could not reach a unanimous agreement; ClientEarth argued that EU law did not allow for this re-classification, and that the instruction to abstain would be illegal as unanimity is not required on conservation issues. ClientEarth also noted that, where EU states cannot agree on international environmental issues, Union Laws require them to vote to protect and strengthen an existing EU position; thus, they argued that the member states should vote against the International Whaling Commission's plan to allow the resumption of commercial whaling.

Also in 2010, ClientEarth highlighted to the EU fisheries ministers that, given the rapid decline of bluefin tuna stocks, they were legally obliged to ban bluefin fishing in the Mediterranean and Atlantic for at least three years, from 2011 to 2013. ClientEarth also argued that France's overfishing in 2007 meant they should be banned from receiving any bluefin catch quota in 2011, and that Italy should also be penalised for overfishing, although less severely than France. However, following the meeting of the International Commission for the Conservation of Atlantic Tunas (ICCAT), the European Council announced that it unanimously agreed to support total allowable catches (TACs) in line with ICCAT's scientific advice. ClientEarth argued that these TACs would mean only a 30–45 percent likelihood that bluefin levels would recover by 2020, despite EU law demanding that all fish stocks are at sustainable levels by this date.

ClientEarth is currently supporting Fish Fight, a campaign backed by Hugh Fearnley-Whittingstall and Channel 4, that aims to stop the practice of discarding fish under the Common Fisheries Policy.

=== Oil industry ===
==== BP plc ====
ClientEarth has complained to the Financial Reporting Review Panel regarding the activities of oil company BP. They argued that the company used a highly unrealistic scenario when predicting future energy demand, enabling them to justify continued investment in risky extraction methods.

==== Shell plc ====
In early‑2022, ClientEarth began civil proceedings against the 13 directors of the UK‑based Shell plc oil major in an attempt to hold these individuals personally responsible for failing to adequately prepare the company for a transition to carbon neutrality. More specifically ClientEarth asserts that these individuals have a fiduciary duty under the UK Companies Act to operate in accordance with the 2015 Paris Agreement. ClientEarth lawyer Paul Benson remarked that "it's the first time that anyone has sought to hold the board accountable for failing to properly prepare for the net zero transition". If the case fails, the judge may well rule that ClientEarth covers the legal costs of the defendants. ClientEarth filed their derivative action claim in February 2023. In July 2023, the High Court rejected the claim. The judge said that it was not appropriate for the court to interfere with "bona fide business decision-making", and that the court could not require the directors to comply with an order by a Dutch court that Shell plc should reduce CO_{2} emissions. ClientEarth said that it would seek leave to appeal.

=== Transparency ===
In 2010, ClientEarth filed a lawsuit against the Council of the European Union, regarding plans to revise the EU's 2002 access-to-documents law, which gives individuals the right to view internal EU documents. ClientEarth sued the Council over its alleged failure to disclose its in-house legal opinion about the review of the 2002 rules.

== Notable employees ==
Employees of ClientEarth include Professor Ludwig Krämer and CEO and founder James Thornton. In 2009 James Thornton was named as one of "ten people who could change the world" by the New Statesman. Thornton also co‑authored the book Client Earth which tells the story of ClientEarth over the last decade.

== Patrons ==
Coldplay are patrons of the organisation. Brian Eno is one of the group's trustees. In June 2019, Pink Floyd band member David Gilmour pledged to donate US$21.5 million, raised from the sale of his guitar collection.
