= Carol Warren =

Pitcairn Islander, from 1973 one of the first two women on the Island Council

Member of the Island Council
- In office 1974–1975, 1978, 1981, 1986–1989, 1991, 1993, 1995, 1998, 2003–2007

Personal details
- Born: 3 April 1950 (age 75); Pitcairn Island

Carol Grace Warren (born 3 April 1950) is a Pitcairn Islander. In 1973 she and Thelma Brown were elected to the Island Council, becoming its first female members.

== Biography ==
Warren was born Carol Grace Christian in April 1950, the daughter of Charlotta Zita Warren and Charles James Bert Christian. She had two children, Ronald and Dean in 1969 and 1971.

In 1973 she stood for election to the Island Council, and was elected unopposed, becoming one of the first female members of the Island Council alongside Thelma Brown. She subsequently had nine spells on the council; 1974–1975, 1978, 1981, 1986–1989, 1991, 1993, 1995, 1998 and 2003–2007.

In 1976 she married Jay Warren, with whom she had two daughters, Darralyn and Charlene. In 2020 Charlene became the first woman to be elected Mayor of Pitcairn.
