= 2009 Pitcairnese general election =

Elections in the Pitcairn Islands

General elections were held in the Pitcairn Islands on 11 December 2009. As there are no political parties on Pitcairn, the Deputy Mayor and all four candidates elected to the Island Council were independents. Simon Young became the first person not born on Pitcairn to be elected Deputy Mayor.

== Electoral system ==
The four elected members were elected by single transferable vote for two year terms. In addition, the Island Council had six other members; the Mayor and the Deputy Mayor, both of whom were elected separately. The four elected members and the Deputy Mayor nominated a further member, whilst two were appointed by the Governor and one seat was reserved for a Commissioner liaising between the Governor and the Island Council.

== Results ==
Voting began at 08:30 and was completed by 10:30. Of the 45 registered voters, 40 cast votes, giving a turnout of 88.9%.

=== Deputy Mayor ===
Candidate	First round		Second round		Third round	
Candidate	Votes	%	Votes	%	Votes	%
Simon Young	12	31.58			21	52.50
Jay Warren	12	31.58			19	47.50
Brenda Christian	8	21.05				
Jacqui Christian	4	10.53				
Pawl Warren	2	5.26				
Total	38	100.00			40	100.00
Source: Pitcairn Island News

=== Island Council ===
Candidate	Votes	%	Notes
Brenda Christian	22	15.94	Re-elected
Jay Warren	20	14.49	Elected
Dave Brown	19	13.77	Re-elected
Lea Brown	19	13.77	Elected
Turi Griffiths	18	13.04	Unseated
Carol Warren	16	11.59	
Pawl Warren	13	9.42	
Jacqui Christian	11	7.97	Unseated
Total	138	100.00	
Source: Pitcairn Island News

Following the election, Pawl Warren was appointed to the Island Council by the Governor.
