= 2022 Pitcairnese mayoral election =

Elections in the Pitcairn Islands

Mayoral elections were held on Pitcairn Island on 9 November 2022. The result was a victory for Simon Young, who became the island's first non-native leader. He won with 19 votes to 16.

== Results ==
Candidate	Votes	%
Simon Young	19	54.29
Other	16	45.71
Total	35	100.00

== Aftermath ==
Young took office on 1 January 2023. A by-election took place on 20 January to elect his replacement on the Island Council.
