= Charlene Warren-Peu =

Pitcairnese politician (born 1979)

5th Mayor of Pitcairn Islands
- In office 1 January 2020 – 31 December 2022
- Monarchs: Elizabeth II; Charles III
- Governor: Laura Clarke; Iona Thomas
- Preceded by: Shawn Christian
- Succeeded by: Simon Young

Deputy Mayor of the Pitcairn Islands
- In office 1 January 2016 – 31 December 2019
- Preceded by: Brenda Christian
- Succeeded by: Kevin Young

Member of the Island Council
- In office 1 January 2014 – 31 December 2015

Personal details
- Born: 9 June 1979 (age 47) Pitcairn Islands
- Spouse: Vaine Warren-Peu
- Parents: Jay Warren (father); Carol Warren (mother)

Charlene Evelyn Dolly Warren-Peu (born 9 June 1979) is a Pitcairnese politician who served as mayor of the Pitcairn Islands from 2020 to 2022. She previously served as a member of the Island Council from 2014 to 2015, and as deputy mayor under Mayor Shawn Christian from 2016 to 2019.

== Early life ==
Charlene Evelyn Dolly Warren-Peu was born in the Pitcairn Islands on 9 June 1979, to Jay Warren and Carol Warren. Warren-Peu is an eighth-generation descendant of the mutineers of HMS Bounty.

== Career ==
Warren-Peu was elected to the Island Council in the 2013 election. She was appointed as deputy mayor under Mayor Shawn Christian in 2016.

Warren-Peu was elected mayor of the Pitcairn Islands in 2019, and was the first woman to hold the position. Kevin Young was selected to serve as deputy mayor under her.

On 7 April 2020, Warren-Peu and Parliamentary Under-Secretary of State for Overseas Territories and Sustainable Development Liz Sugg, Baroness Sugg discussed what to do with somebody on the Pitcairn Islands was infected with COVID-19. The Embassy of the United Kingdom, Paris informed them that French Polynesia was open to accepting infected Pitcairnese and that they had the right to enter Tahiti.

Mike Warren, the former mayor of Pitcairn Islands, was charged with public indecency in 2021. Warren-Peu was one of three islanders that the prosecution presented evidence of as they reported seeing him walking around naked.

In April 2021, Warren-Peu had a falling out with several councilors after she attempted to silence a member of the council after they asked about the condition of longboats.

== Personal life ==
Warren-Peu married Vaine Warren-Peu, a Cook Islander with whom she had five children. They work as beekeepers. At one point in 2019, her daughter was the only child in the Pitcairn Islands.

== Works cited ==
=== Journals ===
- Clegg, Peter (2021). "Pitcairn". The Contemporary Pacific. 33 (1). University of Hawaiʻi Press: 231–238. doi:10.2307/27126734. JSTOR 27126734.

=== News ===
- "Election" (PDF). Dem Tull. October 2013. Archived (PDF) from the original on 26 November 2013.
- Gay, Edward (2 August 2021). "Pitcairn's former mayor facing public indecency charges has reconciliation bid rejected". Stuff. Archived from the original on 1 April 2022.
- Vance, Andrea (6 November 2019). "Charlene Warren-Peu, Pitcairn Island's first female mayor". Stuff. Archived from the original on 7 November 2026.
- Vance, Andrea (23 November 2019). "Pitkerners treasure their unique heritage, but it's time to let them build a future". Stuff. Archived from the original on 9 December 2019.

=== Web ===
- "Pitcairn Island Government: Home". Pacific Union College. Archived from the original on 7 November 2026.
- "Who Are the Pitcairners?". Pacific Union College. Archived from the original on 7 November 2026.
