= 1973 Pitcairnese general election =

Elections in the Pitcairn Islands

General elections were held on Pitcairn Island on 25 December 1973. Ivan Christian was elected as chair of the Internal Committee, with Thelma Brown and Carol Christian elected to the Island Council, becoming its first two female members. All three were elected unopposed.
