= 2013 Pitcairnese general election =

Elections in the Pitcairn Islands

General elections were held in the Pitcairn Islands on 12 November 2013. Shawn Christian was elected mayor, Brenda Christian was elected deputy mayor, and five candidates were elected to the Island Council.

== Results ==
=== Mayor ===
| Candidate | First round | | Second round | | Third round | |
| Candidate | Votes | % | Votes | % | Votes | % |
|---|---|---|---|---|---|---|
| Shawn Christian | 18 | 45.00 | 20 | 50.00 | 20 | 51.28 |
| Simon Young | 18 | 45.00 | 20 | 50.00 | 19 | 48.72 |
| Brenda Christian | 4 | 10.00 | | | | |
| Total | 40 | 100.00 | 40 | 100.00 | 39 | 100.00 |
| Valid votes | 40 | 95.24 | 40 | 95.24 | 39 | 92.86 |
| Invalid/blank votes | 2 | 4.76 | 2 | 4.76 | 3 | 7.14 |
| Total | 42 | 100.00 | 42 | 100.00 | 42 | 100.00 |
Source: Dem Tull

=== Deputy Mayor ===
| Candidate | Votes | % |
|---|---|---|
| Brenda Christian | 28 | 70.00 |
| Jacqui Christian | 12 | 30.00 |
| Total | 40 | 100.00 |
| Valid votes | 40 | 95.24 |
| Invalid/blank votes | 2 | 4.76 |
| Total votes | 42 | 100.00 |
Source: Dem Tull

=== Island Council ===
| Candidate | First round | | Second round | | Notes |
| Candidate | Votes | % | Votes | % | Notes |
|---|---|---|---|---|---|
| Charlene Warren | 31 | 17.92 | | | Elected |
| Darralyn Griffiths | 31 | 17.92 | | | Elected |
| David Brown | 30 | 17.34 | | | Elected |
| Michele Christian | 20 | 11.56 | | | Elected |
| Leslie Jaques | 16 | 9.25 | 27 | 72.97 | Elected |
| Sue O'Keefe | 16 | 9.25 | 10 | 27.03 | |
| Jacqui Christian | 15 | 8.67 | | | |
| Melva Evans | 14 | 8.09 | | | |
| Total | 173 | 100.00 | 37 | 100.00 | |
Source: Dem Tull
