= 2016 Pitcairnese mayoral election =

Mayoral elections were held in the Pitcairn Islands on 9 November 2016. Shawn Christian was re-elected as mayor, defeating Simon Young.
