= Barbican Press =

Barbican Press is an independent publishing house launched in 2013 by Martin J. Goodman for "innovative novels that are just too edgy for the mainstream but allow people to break all bounds and find a unique voice."

Its titles include Kate Horsley's The Monster's Wife, shortlisted for Scottish First Book of the Year 2014., Brian W. Lavery's The Headscarf Revolutionaries, and DD Johnston's The Secret Baby Room.
