= James Thornton (environmentalist) =

American environmental lawyer and writer (born c.1954)

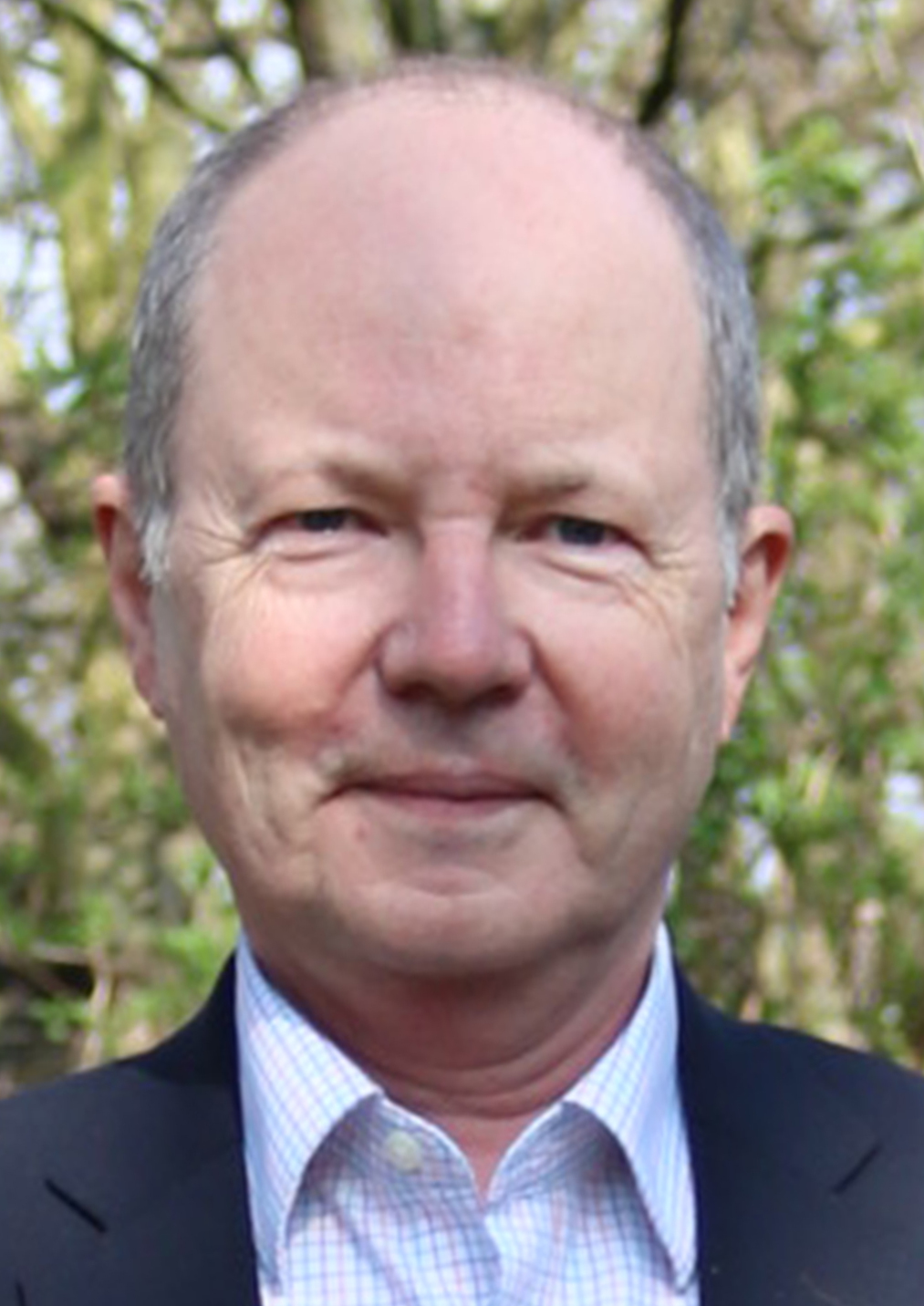
- Thornton in 2016
- Born: c.1954 (age 71–72), New York, USA
- Education: University of Notre Dame; Yale University (BA); New York University (JD)
- Occupation: President and Founder of ClientEarth
- Spouse: Martin J. Goodman
- Website: ClientEarth

James Thornton (born c.1954) is an American environmental lawyer and writer. He is the Founder of ClientEarth, a global non-profit environmental law organisation, and visiting professor of Practice at the Smith School of Enterprise and Environment, Oxford. In 2025 the Financial Times named him among the top 20 heads of international law firms of the last twenty years, the one environmentalist named on the list. He is also a writer (nonfiction, novels, poetry and essay collections), and a Zen Buddhist priest. A profile in Country and Townhouse states that his legal work 'has indeed been world-changing.' He is also an Irish citizen.

== Career ==
=== Education ===
Thornton studied law at the New York University School of Law.

=== Early career ===
Before heading for Europe, Thornton worked for Natural Resources Defense Council (NRDC), for whom he set up the citizens' enforcement project focusing on the Clean Water Act when the Reagan administration dropped its own enforcement. He brought and won sixty cases in the federal courts in six months. The enforcement project was funded by the McIntosh Foundation, led by Mike and Winsome McIntosh, who would later become the founding funders of ClientEarth.

Thornton then moved to the NRDC office in San Francisco, from where he founded the LA Office of NRDC. He moved to LA to run it, staying at the Zen Center of Los Angeles.

=== ClientEarth ===
Thornton founded ClientEarth in 2006. The International Bar Association has called ClientEarth “a public interest law firm, the first in the UK and continental Europe”. Now with offices in London, Brussels, Warsaw, Berlin, New York and Beijing, and operating globally, it uses advocacy, litigation and research to address the greatest challenges of our time - including biodiversity loss, climate change, and toxic chemicals. Its work is built on solid law and science. ClientEarth's patrons are Coldplay, and Brian Eno is a trustee. In 2012 ClientEarth won Business Green's NGO of the Year award. In 2013, it won the Law Society Gazette's Excellence in Environmental Responsibility Award.

In 2011, ClientEarth's action in the High Court forced the UK government to admit that it was breaching legal limits for air pollution. In 2012 ClientEarth's amicus curiae (friends of the court) brief in the cases challenging the authority of the Environmental Protection Agency (EPA) to regulate carbon pollution was the first time that European groups have entered a US environmental case this way. Thornton calls the Common Fisheries Policy 'the worst law in the world' and is working with the Fish Fight campaign of TV chef Hugh Fearnley-Whittingstall to make it workable. He also works to enforce the Aarhus Convention, working to give citizens access to courts in order to seek environmental justice.

=== Influence, memberships and media ===
Thornton appeared on stage with Brian Eno at the Luminous Festival, Sydney Opera House, in 2009 to discuss the environment. He also featured in the BBC2 Arena documentary of Brian Eno. At this time Thornton wrote for The Sydney Morning Herald on why humanity needs a new renaissance.

In 2009 the New Statesman named Thornton as one of ten people who could change the world. He was also called 'a new kind of environmental hero' by BBC Radio 4 and Metropolitan magazine called him 'La force tranquille'. In 2013 The Lawyer identified him as one of the Top 100 lawyers practising in the UK. The Financial Times awarded him its Special Achievement Award at the 2016 Innovative Lawyer Awards. James's TED TALK, featuring his work with the Supreme Court of China, has been viewed more than 1.8 million times.

Thornton is a member of the bars of New York, California, and the Supreme Court of the United States, and a Solicitor of England and Wales. He is a Conservation Fellow of the Zoological Society of London and a fellow of Ashoka, the network of leaders in social innovations. His latest book, Client Earth is described by Nature as "a tantalizing glimpse of how a variety of strategies can converge to create a global environmental enforcement effort."

== Personal life ==
Thornton is a Zen Buddhist. He did a retreat with the Indian teacher Mother Meera in Germany for 14 months, after which he started Positive Futures, an organization to teach meditation to environmental activists. For some years he was executive director of the Heffter Research Institute, which worked on the medical application of hallucinogens among other neuroscience developments. For Theodore Roszak he wrote one of the founding documents for the ecopsychology movement, an early precursor of Wild Law. He was ordained a priest in the Soto Zen order at the Zen Center of Los Angeles in April 2009, by Roshi Wendy Egyoku Nakao. Attraction to study with the Japanese Zen Master Taizan Maezumi Roshi, was a reason why Thornton moved to San Francisco in 2009.

Thornton wrote A Field Guide to the Soul, a guide to spiritual practice. He also co-authored a major study of company reporting law 'Environmental and social transparency under the Companies Act 2006: Digging Deeper' and his first novel Immediate Harm was published in 2011, and his second novel Sphinx the Second Coming came out in 2014.

Thornton is a frequent blogger on the Huffington Post. He co-wrote Client Earth: Building an Ecological Civilization with his husband Martin J. Goodman. It won Judges' Choice in the Business Book Awards 2018. His debut poetry collection The Feynman Challenge, which takes up a challenge by the physicist Richard Feynman that poets should tackle the realities of science, came out from Barbican Press in the UK in 2017. E.O. Wilson says of it: 'In this unusual and exceptionally interesting work, James Thornton speaks as both a poet who has colonized science and a scientist who speaks a poetic tongue.' Further titles, including the recent Nature, My Teacher, are featured on James Thornton's Author Page on Barbican Press.

Thornton is a keen ornithologist.
