= Kate Horsley (UK author) =

Kate Horsley is the author of two novels, The American Girl and The Monster's Wife. Most of her short and long fiction, including The American Girl, has been within the crime fiction genre, although her début novel, The Monster's Wife, is historical gothic fiction. Horsley is a co-editor (with her mother, Lee Horsley) of crime fiction review site crimeculture.com.

== Early life ==
The child of academics, Horsley had an unconventional upbringing and was educated at home for parts of her childhood. She studied English literature at Oxford University and at the age of 21, she moved to Boston to take up a scholarship at Harvard where she studied Medieval Literature. She lectured at Harvard for a year before returning to the UK.

== Career ==
Horsley's poems and short fiction have been published in a number of magazines and anthologies including The Mammoth Book of Best British Crime.

Her first novel, The Monster's Wife, was published by Barbican Press in September 2014. A sequel to Mary Shelley's Frankenstein, the novel is set on one of the Scottish Orkney Islands and narrated from the perspective of the girl Victor Frankenstein transformed into a bride for his monster.

Her second novel, The American Girl, was published by William Morrow in August 2016. She teaches on the Creative Writing MA at the University of Hull.

== Awards ==
In 2014, Horsley was shortlisted for the Scottish First Book of the Year (Saltire) Award for The Monster’s Wife. She has previously won awards for her work from Sentinel Literary Quarterly and Adoption Matters Northwest and been shortlisted for an Asham award for short fiction and a Ravenglass Poetry Press Prize.

== Bibliography ==
Novels

- The American Girl. (William Morrow, 2016, ISBN 978-0062438515)
- The Monster's Wife. (Barbican Press, 2014, ISBN 978-1909954052)

Short Stories

- 'Kissing Hitler'. Even Birds Are Chained To The Sky and Other Tales (The Fine Line, 2011, ISBN 978-0956761057)
- 'Jungle Boogie'. The Mammoth Book of Best British Crime 9 (Robinson Publishing, 2012, ISBN 978-1780330945)
- 'Tin Valentine'. Dark Valentine Magazine, June 2011
- 'Star's Jar'. The Mammoth Book of Best British Crime 7 (Robinson Publishing, 2010, ISBN 978-1849011976 )
- 'Musooli'. Momaya Annual Review (Momaya Press, 2008, ISBN 978-0615172767)

Poetry

- 'Paper Bullets' and other poems, Bliss Anthology (Templar, 2011, ISBN 978-1906285173)
- ‘Port-au-Prince’ and other poems, The Ravenglass Poetry Press Anthology, (The Ravenglass Poetry Press, 2011, ISBN 978-0956539540)
- 'Rules for Looking After Ian', winning competition entry, Lancashire Adoption Matters, 2011
- ‘A Patch of Grass’ and other poems, Erbacce Magazine, 2011
- ‘Eleonora of Toledo laughs at a pantomime dildo’, Sentinel Literary Quarterly (winner), Sentinel Champions 5, 2011

Articles

- 'Interrogations of Society in Contemporary African Crime Writing'. (Crime Across Cultures, Issue 13.1 of Moving Worlds, Spring 2013)
- 'Storyboarding and Storytelling: Literacy and the Short Story'. (Short Fiction in Theory and Practice, Issue 2, Spring 2012)
- 'Radiophonics'. With Graham Mort. (Writing in Education, Spring 2008)
- 'Learning Italian: Serial Killers Abroad in the Novels of Highsmith and Harris'. With Lee Horsley. (University of Delaware Press, Monash Romance Studies Series, 2008)
- 'Body Language: Reading the Corpse in Forensic Crime Fiction'. With Lee Horsley. (Paradoxa, Summer 2006)
- 'Mères Fatales: Maternal Guilt in the Noir Crime Novel'. With Lee Horsley. (Modern Fiction Studies, vol. 45.2, Summer 1999)
