= Shawn Christian (mayor) =

Pitcairn Islands politician and child rapist (born 1975)

4th and 7th Mayor of the Pitcairn Islands
- Incumbent
- Assumed office 1 January 2026
- Monarch: Charles III
- Governor: Iona Thomas; Louise Cantillon
- Preceded by: Simon Young
- In office 1 January 2014 – 31 December 2019
- Monarch: Elizabeth II
- Governor: Victoria Treadell; Jonathan Sinclair; Laura Clarke
- Preceded by: Mike Warren
- Succeeded by: Charlene Warren-Peu

Personal details
- Born: 14 September 1975 (age 51) Adamstown, Pitcairn Islands

Shawn Brent Christian (born 14 September 1975) is a Pitcairnese politician who has served as Mayor of the Pitcairn Islands since 2026, having previously held the office between 2014 and 2019. He previously served a prison sentence after being convicted of child rape.

== Biography ==
Christian was born to Steve Christian and Olive Jal Brown, and was named after Shawn Branigan, the son of friends of his parents. He is a patrilineal great-great-great-great-great-grandson of Fletcher Christian. In 1998 he moved to Australia and studied in Newcastle, New South Wales.

Along with his father, who was then serving as the islands' mayor, and older brother Randall, he was implicated in the Pitcairn sexual assault trial in 2004, and after being extradited from New Zealand to stand trial, was found guilty of two counts of child rape and one count of aiding or abetting a rape. One of the charges related to an incident in which he and his brother gang raped a 12-year-old girl. He was sentenced to three-and-a-half years in prison, but was released after two years. Due to the dearth of manpower on the island, he and two other defendants were needed to help build the HM Prison Pitcairn where they would be detained.

In the 2013 elections, Christian was elected Mayor of the Pitcairn Islands, beating Simon Young in the third round of voting with a majority of just one vote, after no candidate received an absolute majority in the first round and the second round (runoff) resulted in a tie. He was re-elected in the 2016 elections for another three-year term. Rhiannon Adam, an Irish photojournalist who stayed on the island for 3 months in 2015, discusses Christian's successful mayoral runs despite being a convicted paedophile in Big Fences / Pitcairn Island (2022). In a 2019 Daily Telegraph profile on the island's post-scandal legacy, Nigel Richardson notes, 'The decision by islanders to elect Shawn Christian as mayor was evidently taken with no consideration for the kind of image or message it projects', and quotes Adam's remark that, 'By allowing [Shawn Christian] to hold office it's already saying, "Yeah, but the trial wasn't really a big deal, was it?" If you really want Pitcairn Island to have a future, he should be the one stepping down." Christian was again elected mayor in the 2025 elections.
