= List of legislatures by number of members =

This is a list of legislatures by number of members. Non-sovereign entities and unrecognized states are marked in italics.

== Lists ==
Some of the lower and upper houses are named by approximation. For instance, the European Parliament is not a legislature with two fixed chambers of elected bodies, but rather one house of elected representatives, alongside another council of a rotating group of appointed government ministers, whose makeup changes every meeting depending on the topic being discussed. The precise nature of this organisation has been debated extensively in academic literature, with some categorising the European Union's legislature as not bicameral but tricameral or even neither.

- Table pre-sorted by total count of both chambers

Country	Legislature	Type	Seats				Population		
Country	Legislature	Type	Lower house	Upper house	L/U ratio	Total	country	per 1 lower house seat	per each of total seats
China	National People's Congress	unicameral	2,847	—	—	2,847	1,404,890,000	493,463	493,463
United Kingdom	Parliament of the United Kingdom	bicameral	650	797	0.816	1,447	68,350,000	98,066	44,051
France	French Parliament	bicameral	577	348	1.658	925	68,400,000	112,342	70,077
Egypt	Parliament of Egypt	bicameral	596	300	1.987	896	112,716,598	168,436	112,040
India	Parliament of India	bicameral	543	245	2.172	788	1,435,405,824	2,643,473	1,810,096
European Union	–	bicameral	720 (European Parliament)	27 (The Council)	26.111	747	449,476,878	636,011	612,552
Indonesia	People's Consultative Assembly	bicameral	580	152	4.228	732	282,477,584	472,013	381,726
Japan	National Diet	bicameral	465	248	1.921	713	124,516,650	271,938	178,856
Thailand	National Assembly of Thailand	bicameral	500	200	2.5	700	65,916,962	131,834	94,167
Germany	–	bicameral	630 (Bundestag)	69 (Bundesrat)	9.130	699	84,482,267	134,099	120,861
Korea, North	Supreme People's Assembly	unicameral	687	—	—	687	24,851,627	36,174	36,174
Ethiopia	Federal Parliamentary Assembly	bicameral	547 (House of Peoples' Representatives)	112 (House of Federation)	5.065	659	126,527,060	176,661	147,532
Mexico	Congress of the Union	bicameral	500	128	3.906	628	128,455,567	240,573	191,539
Russia	Federal Assembly	bicameral	450	178	2.528	628	147,182,123	327,071	234,366
Spain	Cortes Generales	bicameral	350	264	1.362	614	47,737,941	136,394	78,646
Congo, Democratic Republic of the	Parliament of the Democratic Republic of the Congo	bicameral	500	108	4.63	608	77,433,744	154,867	127,358
Algeria	Parliament of Algeria	bicameral	462	144	3.208	606	38,813,722	84,012	64,049
Italy	Italian Parliament	bicameral	400	205	1.951	605	59,030,133	147,575	97,570
Turkey	Grand National Assembly of Turkey	unicameral	600	—	—	600	84,339,067	140,565	140,565
Brazil	National Congress of Brazil	bicameral	513	81	6.333	594	210,147,125	409,644	353,783
Poland	Parliament of Poland	bicameral	460	100	4.6	560	38,346,279	83,361	68,475
United States	United States Congress	bicameral	435	100	4.35	535	318,892,103	733,085	596,060
Uganda	Parliament of Uganda	unicameral	529	—	—	529	35,918,915	67,900	67,900
Morocco	Parliament of Morocco	bicameral	395	120	1.463	515	37,840,044	83,512	49,605
Vietnam	National Assembly	unicameral	500	—	—	500	93,421,835	186,844	186,844
South Africa	Parliament of South Africa	bicameral	400	90	4.444	490	63,100,000	157,750	128,776
Cuba	National Assembly of People's Power	unicameral	470	—	—	470	11,047,251	23,505	23,505
Nigeria	National Assembly	bicameral	360	109	3.303	469	177,155,754	492,099	377,731
Romania	Parliament of Romania	bicameral	330	134	2.47	464	20,121,641	60,790	43,272
Sudan	National Legislature	bicameral	426	32	9	458	35,482,233	78,849	70,964
Ukraine	Verkhovna Rada	unicameral	450	—	—	450	44,291,413	98,425	98,425
Canada	Parliament of Canada	bicameral	343	105	3.267	448	36,991,981	107,848	84,456
Pakistan	Parliament of Pakistan	bicameral	336	96	3.288	432	196,174,380	573,609	439,853
Kenya	Parliament of Kenya	bicameral	349	67	5.209	416	45,010,056	128,969	108,197
Yemen	Parliament of Yemen	bicameral	301	111	2.712	412	26,052,966	86,555	63,235
South Sudan	National Legislature	bicameral	332 (National Legislative Assembly)	50 (Council of States)	6.64	382	11,562,695	34,827	30,269
Tanzania	National Assembly	unicameral	357	—	—	357	49,639,138	139,045	139,045
Côte d'Ivoire	Parliament of Ivory Coast	bicameral	255	99	2.576	354	22,848,945	89,604	64,545
Bangladesh	Jatiya Sangsad	unicameral	350	—	—	350	169,828,911	485,225	485,225
Zimbabwe	Parliament of Zimbabwe	bicameral	270	80	3.375	350	13,771,721	51,006	39,348
Sweden	Riksdag	unicameral	349	—	—	349	9,723,809	27,862	27,862
Philippines	Congress of the Philippines	bicameral	316	24	13.167	340	109,035,343	345,049	320,692
Nepal	Federal Parliament of Nepal	bicameral	275	59	4.661	334	28,982,771	105,392	86,775
Argentina	National Congress of Argentina	bicameral	257	72	3.569	329	43,024,374	167,410	130,773
Somalia	Federal Parliament of Somalia	bicameral	275	54	5.093	329	10,428,043	37,920	31,696
Iraq	Council of Representatives of Iraq	unicameral	325	—	—	325	32,585,692	100,264	100,264
Greece	Hellenic Parliament	unicameral	300	—	—	300	10,775,557	35,919	35,919
Korea, South	National Assembly	unicameral	300	—	—	300	49,039,986	163,467	163,467
Malaysia	Parliament of Malaysia	bicameral	222	70	3.171	292	30,073,353	135,466	102,991
Iran	Islamic Consultative Assembly	unicameral	290	—	—	290	80,840,713	278,761	278,761
Czech Republic	Parliament of the Czech Republic	bicameral	200	81	2.469	281	10,627,448	53,137	37,820
Cameroon	Parliament of Cameroon	bicameral	180 (National Assembly)	100 (Senate)	1.8	280	23,130,708	128,504	82,610
Ghana	Parliament of Ghana	unicameral	276	—	—	276	25,758,108	93,326	93,326
Colombia	Congress of Colombia	bicameral	166	102	1.627	268	49,336,454	297,208	184,091
Mozambique	Assembly of the Republic	unicameral	250	—	—	250	24,692,144	98,769	98,769
Serbia	National Assembly	unicameral	250	—	—	250	7,209,764 (Note: Excluding Kosovo); 9,068,967 (Note: Including Kosovo)	28,839	28,839
Syria	People's Assembly of Syria	unicameral	250	—	—	250	17,951,639	71,807	71,807
Uzbekistan	Oliy Majlis	bicameral	150	100	1.5	250	28,929,716	192,865	115,719
Switzerland	Federal Assembly	bicameral	200	46	4.348	246	8,061,516	40,308	32,770
Austria	Austrian Parliament	bicameral	183	62	2.952	245	8,223,062	44,935	33,564
Bulgaria	National Assembly	unicameral	240	—	—	240	6,924,716	28,853	28,853
Ireland	Oireachtas	bicameral	174	60	2.9	234	4,937,786	28,378	21,101
Portugal	Assembly of the Republic	unicameral	230	—	—	230	10,813,834	47,017	47,017
Australia	Parliament of Australia	bicameral	150	76	1.987	226	27,286,253	149,057	99,152
Netherlands	States General of the Netherlands	bicameral	150	75	2	225	18,047,200	120,315	80,210
Sri Lanka	Parliament of Sri Lanka	unicameral	225	—	—	225	21,866,445	97,184	97,184
Gabon	Parliament of Gabon	bicameral	120	102	1.176	222	1,672,597	13,938	7,534
Angola	National Assembly	unicameral	220	—	—	220	19,088,106	86,764	86,764
Tunisia	Assembly of the Representatives of the People	unicameral	217	—	—	217	10,937,521	50,403	50,403
Dominican Republic	Congress of the Dominican Republic	bicameral	183	32	5.719	215	10,349,741	56,556	48,138
Congo, Republic of the	Parliament of the Republic of the Congo	bicameral	139	72	1.931	211	4,662,446	33,543	22,097
Belgium	Belgian Federal Parliament	bicameral	150	60	2.5	210	11,420,163	76,134	54,382
Jordan	Parliament of Jordan	bicameral	150	60	2.5	210	7,930,491	52,870	37,764
Chile	National Congress of Chile	bicameral	155	50	3.1	205	17,574,003	113,381	85,727
Finland	Parliament of Finland	unicameral	200	—	—	200	5,603,851	26,344	26,344
Libya	House of Representatives	unicameral	200	—	—	200	6,244,174	31,221	31,221
Hungary	National Assembly	unicameral	199	—	—	199	9,919,128	49,845	49,845
Malawi	National Assembly	unicameral	193	—	—	193	17,377,468	90,039	90,039
Peru	Congress of the Republic of Peru	bicameral	130	60	2.167	190	30,147,935	231,907	158,673
Chad	National Assembly	unicameral	188	—	—	188	11,412,107	60,703	60,703
Cambodia	Parliament of Cambodia	bicameral	123	61	2.016	184	15,458,332	125,677	84,013
Madagascar	Parliament of Madagascar	bicameral	151	33	4.576	184	23,201,926	153,655	126,097
Denmark	Folketing	unicameral	179	—	—	179	5,932,654	31,112	31,112
Belarus	National Assembly of Belarus	bicameral	110	64	1.719	174	9,608,058	87,346	55,219
Equatorial Guinea	Parliament of Equatorial Guinea	bicameral	100	70	1.429	170	722,254	7,223	4,249
Norway	Storting	unicameral	169	—	—	169	5,147,792	30,460	30,460
Burundi	Parliament of Burundi	bicameral	120	~48	2.5	168	10,395,931	86,633	61,881
Bolivia	Plurinational Legislative Assembly	bicameral	130	36	3.611	166	10,631,486	81,781	64,045
Venezuela	National Assembly	unicameral	165	—	—	165	28,868,486	174,961	174,961
Senegal	National Assembly	unicameral	165	—	—	165	13,635,927	82,641	82,641
Mali	National Assembly	unicameral	160	—	—	160	16,455,903	102,849	102,849
Guatemala	Congress of the Republic of Guatemala	unicameral	158	—	—	158	14,647,083	92,703	92,703
Zambia	National Assembly of Zambia	unicameral	158	—	—	158	14,638,505	92,649	92,649
Oman	Council of Oman	bicameral	84 (Consultative Assembly)	71 (Council of State)	1.183	155	3,219,775	38,331	20,773
Kazakhstan	Parliament of Kazakhstan	bicameral	107	47	2.277	154	17,948,816	167,746	116,551
Lesotho	Parliament of Lesotho	bicameral	120 (National Assembly)	33 (Senate of Lesotho)	3.636	153	1,942,008	16,183	12,693
Croatia	Croatian Parliament	unicameral	151	—	—	151	4,470,534	29,606	29,606
Eritrea	National Assembly	unicameral	150	—	—	150	6,380,803	42,539	42,539
Georgia	Parliament of Georgia	unicameral	150	—	—	150	4,935,880	32,906	32,906
Saudi Arabia	Consultative Assembly of Saudi Arabia	unicameral	150	—	—	150	27,345,986	182,307	182,307
Slovakia	National Council	unicameral	150	—	—	150	5,443,583	36,291	36,291
Laos	National Assembly	unicameral	149	—	—	149	6,803,699	45,662	45,662
Mauritania	Mauritanian Parliament	unicameral	146	—	—	146	3,516,806	24,088	24,088
Lithuania	Parliament of Lithuania	unicameral	141	—	—	141	2,848,000	20,199	20,199
Albania	Parliament of Albania	unicameral	140	—	—	140	3,020,209	21,573	21,573
Ecuador	National Assembly	unicameral	137	—	—	137	15,654,411	114,266	114,266
Palestine	Palestinian Legislative Council	unicameral	132	—	—	132	4,816,503	36,489	36,489
Slovenia	Slovenian Parliament	bicameral	90	40	2.25	130	2,070,050	23,001	15,923
Haiti	Haitian Parliament	bicameral	99	30	3.3	129	9,996,731	100,977	77,494
Uruguay	General Assembly of Uruguay	bicameral	99	30	3.3	129	3,332,972	33,666	25,837
Honduras	National Congress of Honduras	unicameral	128	—	—	128	8,598,561	67,176	67,176
Lebanon	Parliament of Lebanon	unicameral	128	—	—	128	5,882,562	45,958	45,958
Burkina Faso	National Assembly of Burkina Faso	unicameral	127	—	—	127	18,365,123	144,607	144,607
Mongolia	State Great Khural	unicameral	126	—	—	126	3,251,587	25,521	25,521
Azerbaijan	National Assembly	unicameral	125	—	—	125	9,686,210	77,490	77,490
Paraguay	Congress of Paraguay	bicameral	80	45	1.778	125	6,703,860	83,798	53,631
Turkmenistan	Assembly of Turkmenistan	unicameral	125	—	—	125	5,171,943	41,376	41,376
Sierra Leone	Parliament of Sierra Leone	unicameral	124	—	—	124	5,743,725	46,320	46,320
North Macedonia	Assembly of North Macedonia	unicameral	123	—	—	123	2,091,719	17,006	17,006
Israel	Knesset	unicameral	120	—	—	120	7,821,850	65,182	65,182
Kosovo	Assembly of the Republic of Kosovo	unicameral	120	—	—	120	1,859,203	15,493	15,493
New Zealand	Parliament of New Zealand	unicameral	120 (Note: New Zealand's parliament frequently has more than 120 members due to MMP overhang)	—	—	120	4,993,923	41,616	41,616
Armenia	National Assembly	unicameral	118	—	—	118	3,060,631	25,938	25,938
Guinea	National Assembly	unicameral	114	—	—	114	11,474,383	100,652	100,652
Niger	National Assembly	unicameral	113	—	—	113	17,466,172	154,568	154,568
Taiwan	Legislative Yuan	unicameral	113	—	—	113	23,359,928	206,725	206,725
Togo	National Assembly	unicameral	113	—	—	113	7,351,374	65,056	65,056
Papua New Guinea	National Parliament of Papua New Guinea	unicameral	111	—	—	111	6,552,730	59,034	59,034
Benin	National Assembly	unicameral	109	—	—	109	10,160,556	93,216	93,216
Singapore	Parliament of Singapore	unicameral	108	—	—	108	5,700,000	52,777	52,777
Rwanda	Parliament of Rwanda	bicameral	80	26	3.077	106	12,337,138	154,214	116,388
Central African Republic	Parliament of the Central African Republic	unicameral	105	—	—	105	5,277,959	50,266	50,266
Liberia	Legislature of Liberia	bicameral	73	30	2.433	103	4,092,310	56,059	39,731
Guinea-Bissau	National People's Assembly	unicameral	102	—	—	102	1,693,398	16,602	16,602
Estonia	Riigikogu	unicameral	101	—	—	101	1,257,921	12,455	12,455
Moldova	Parliament of the Republic of Moldova	unicameral	101	—	—	101	3,583,288	35,478	35,478
Latvia	Saeima	unicameral	100	—	—	100	1,893,223	18,932	18,932
Namibia	Parliament of Namibia	bicameral	72	26	2.769	98	2,198,406	30,533	22,433
Tajikistan	Supreme Assembly	bicameral	63	34	1.853	97	8,051,512	127,802	83,005
Eswatini	Parliament of Eswatini	bicameral	65 (House of Assembly)	30 (Senate)	2.167	95	1,419,623	21,840	14,943
Maldives	People's Majlis	unicameral	93	—	—	93	393,595	4,232	4,232
Kyrgyzstan	Supreme Council	unicameral	90	—	—	90	7,281,800	80,909	80,909
Hong Kong	Legislative Council of Hong Kong	unicameral	90	—	—	90	7,112,688	79,030	79,030
Nicaragua	National Assembly	unicameral	90	—	—	90	5,848,641	64,271	64,271
Jamaica	Parliament of Jamaica	bicameral	63	21	3	84	2,930,050	46,509	34,882
Montenegro	Parliament of Montenegro	unicameral	81	—	—	81	650,036	8,025	8,025
Puerto Rico	Legislative Assembly of Puerto Rico	bicameral	51	30	1.7	81	3,620,897	70,998	44,702
Bahrain	National Assembly	bicameral	40	40	1	80	1,314,089	32,852	16,426
Cyprus	House of Representatives	unicameral	80	—	—	80	1,172,458	14,656	14,656
Malta	Parliament of Malta	unicameral	79	—	—	79	535,064	6,773	6,773
Bhutan	Parliament of Bhutan	bicameral	47	25	1.88	72	733,643	15,609	10,189
Cape Verde	National Assembly	unicameral	72	—	—	72	538,535	7,480	7,480
Trinidad and Tobago	Parliament of Trinidad and Tobago	bicameral	41	31	1.323	72	1,223,916	29,852	16,999
Panama	Parliament of Panama	unicameral	71	—	—	71	3,608,431	50,823	50,823
Botswana	Parliament of Botswana	unicameral	69	—	—	69	2,155,784	31,243	31,243
Mauritius	National Assembly	unicameral	66	—	—	66	1,331,155	20,169	20,169
Djibouti	National Assembly	unicameral	65	—	—	65	810,179	12,464	12,464
Guyana	National Assembly	unicameral	65	—	—	65	735,554	11,316	11,316
Kuwait	National Assembly	unicameral	65	—	—	65	2,742,711	42,196	42,196
Timor-Leste	National Parliament	unicameral	65	—	—	65	1,201,542	18,485	18,485
Iceland	Althing	unicameral	63	—	—	63	391,180	6,209	6,209
El Salvador	Legislative Assembly of El Salvador	unicameral	60	—	—	60	6,125,512	102,091	102,091
Luxembourg	Chamber of Deputies	unicameral	60	—	—	60	681,973	11,366	11,366
San Marino	Grand and General Council	unicameral	60	—	—	60	32,742	546	546
Jersey	States Assembly	unicameral	58	—	—	58	96,513	1,664	1,664
Bosnia and Herzegovina	Parliamentary Assembly of Bosnia and Herzegovina	bicameral	42 (House of Representatives)	15 (House of Peoples)	2.8	57	3,871,643	92,182	67,924
Costa Rica	Legislative Assembly of Costa Rica	unicameral	57	—	—	57	4,755,234	83,425	83,425
French Polynesia	Assembly of French Polynesia	unicameral	57	—	—	57	280,026	4,913	4,913
São Tomé and Príncipe	National Assembly	unicameral	55	—	—	55	190,428	3,462	3,462
Bahamas, The	Parliament of the Bahamas	bicameral	38	16	2.375	54	321,834	8,469	5,960
New Caledonia	Congress of New Caledonia	unicameral	54	—	—	54	267,840	4,960	4,960
Gambia, The	National Assembly of the Gambia	unicameral	53	—	—	53	1,925,527	36,331	36,331
Vanuatu	Parliament of Vanuatu	unicameral	52	—	—	52	266,937	5,133	5,133
Barbados	Parliament of Barbados	bicameral	30	21	1.429	51	289,680	9,656	5,680
Suriname	National Assembly	unicameral	51	—	—	51	573,311	11,241	11,241
Fiji	Parliament of Fiji	unicameral	50	—	—	50	903,207	18,064	18,064
Solomon Islands	National Parliament of Solomon Islands	unicameral	50	—	—	50	609,883	12,198	12,198
Samoa	Legislative Assembly of Samoa	unicameral	49	—	—	49	196,628	4,013	4,013
Bermuda	Parliament of Bermuda	bicameral	36 (House of Assembly)	11 (Senate)	3.273	47	69,839	1,940	1,486
Kiribati	House of Assembly	unicameral	46	—	—	46	104,488	2,271	2,271
Guernsey	States of Guernsey	unicameral	45	—	—	45	65,849	1,463	1,463
Qatar	Consultative Assembly of Qatar	unicameral	45	—	—	45	2,123,160	47,181	47,181
Transnistria	Supreme Council	unicameral	45	—	—	45	469,000	10,422	10,422
Belize	Parliament of Belize	bicameral	31	12	2.583	43	340,844	10,995	7,927
United Arab Emirates	Federal National Council	unicameral	40	—	—	40	5,628,805	140,720	140,720
American Samoa	American Samoa Fono	bicameral	21	18	1.167	39	54,517	2,596	1,398
Isle of Man	Tynwald	bicameral	24	11	2.182	35	86,866	3,619	2,482
Abkhazia	People's Assembly of Abkhazia	unicameral	35	—	—	35	243,206	6,949	6,949
Antigua and Barbuda	Parliament of Antigua and Barbuda	bicameral	17	17	1	34	91,295	5,370	2,685
Seychelles	National Assembly	unicameral	34	—	—	34	91,650	2,696	2,696
South Ossetia	Parliament of South Ossetia	unicameral	34	—	—	34	53,532	1,574	1,574
Brunei	Legislative Council of Brunei	unicameral	33	—	—	33	422,675	12,808	12,808
Comoros	Assembly of the Union of the Comoros	unicameral	33	—	—	33	766,865	23,238	23,238
Faroe Islands	Løgting	unicameral	33	—	—	33	49,947	1,514	1,514
Macau	Legislative Council of Macau	unicameral	33	—	—	33	587,914	17,816	17,816
Marshall Islands	Legislature of the Marshall Islands	unicameral	33	—	—	33	70,983	2,151	2,151
Dominica	House of Assembly of Dominica	unicameral	32	—	—	32	73,449	2,295	2,295
Greenland	Inatsisartut	unicameral	31	—	—	31	57,728	1,862	1,862
Islamic Emirate of Afghanistan	Leadership Council	unicameral	Aprx. 30	—	—	Aprx. 30	31,822,848	1,060,762 (Note: Assuming membership of 30. This is only an estimate; the size of the council is not fixed and the membership is not fully verified.)	
Northern Mariana Islands	Northern Mariana Islands Commonwealth Legislature	bicameral	20	9	2.222	29	51,483	2,574	1,775
Andorra	General Council	unicameral	28	—	—	28	85,458	3,052	3,052
Grenada	Parliament of Grenada	bicameral	15	13	1.154	28	110,152	7,343	3,934
Saint Lucia	Parliament of Saint Lucia	bicameral	17	11	1.545	28	163,362	9,610	5,834
Tonga	Legislative Assembly of Tonga	unicameral	26	—	—	26	106,440	4,094	4,094
Liechtenstein	Landtag of Liechtenstein	unicameral	25	—	—	25	37,313	1,493	1,493
Palau	Palau National Congress	bicameral	16	9	1.778	25	21,186	1,324	847
Cook Islands	Parliament of the Cook Islands	unicameral	24	—	—	24	10,134	422	422
Monaco	National Council	unicameral	24	—	—	24	30,508	1,271	1,271
Saint Martin		unicameral	23	—	—	23	31,530	1,371	1,371
Adjara	Supreme Council of the Autonomous Republic of Adjara	unicameral	21	—	—	21	349,000	16,619	16,619
Aruba	Parliament of Aruba	unicameral	21	—	—	21	110,663	5,270	5,270
Cayman Islands	Parliament of the Cayman Islands	unicameral	21	—	—	21	54,914	2,615	2,615
Curaçao	Parliament of Curaçao	unicameral	21	—	—	21	146,836	6,992	6,992
Saint Vincent and the Grenadines	House of Assembly of Saint Vincent and the Grenadines	unicameral	21	—	—	21	102,918	4,901	4,901
Niue	Niue Assembly	unicameral	20	—	—	20	1,190	60	60
Tokelau	General Fono	unicameral	20	—	—	20	1,337	67	67
Wallis and Futuna	Territorial Assembly of Wallis and Futuna	unicameral	20	—	—	20	15,561	778	778
Nauru	Parliament of Nauru	unicameral	19	—	—	19	9,488	499	499
Saint Barthelemy	Territorial Council of Saint Barthélemy	unicameral	19	—	—	19	7,267	382	382
Saint Pierre and Miquelon	Territorial Council of Saint Pierre and Miquelon	unicameral	19	—	—	19	5,716	301	301
Turks and Caicos Islands	House of Assembly	unicameral	19	—	—	19	49,070	2,583	2,583
Gibraltar	Gibraltar Parliament	unicameral	17	—	—	17	32,688	1,923	1,923
Saint Helena, Ascension and Tristan da Cunha	Legislative Council of Saint Helena	unicameral	17	—	—	17	7,776	457	457
British Virgin Islands	House of Assembly of the British Virgin Islands	unicameral	15	—	—	15	32,680	2,179	2,179
Guam	Legislature of Guam	unicameral	15	—	—	15	161,001	10,733	10,733
Sint Maarten	Parliament of Sint Maarten	unicameral	15	—	—	15	39,689	2,646	2,646
Tuvalu	Parliament of Tuvalu	unicameral	15	—	—	15	10,782	719	719
United States Virgin Islands	Legislature of the Virgin Islands	unicameral	15	—	—	15	104,170	6,945	6,945
Micronesia, Federated States of	Congress of the Federated States of Micronesia	unicameral	14	—	—	14	105,681	7,549	7,549
Saint Kitts and Nevis	National Assembly	unicameral	14	—	—	14	51,538	3,681	3,681
Anguilla	House of Assembly	unicameral	13	—	—	13	16,086	1,237	1,237
Montserrat	Legislative Assembly of Montserrat	unicameral	11	—	—	11	5,215	474	474
Falkland Islands	Legislative Assembly of the Falkland Islands	unicameral	10	—	—	10	2,840	284	284
Pitcairn Islands	Island Council	unicameral	10	—	—	10	48	5	5
Christmas Island	Shire of Christmas Island	unicameral	9	—	—	9	1,530	170	170
Norfolk Island	Norfolk Island Regional Council	unicameral	9	—	—	9	2,210	246	246
Cocos (Keeling) Islands	Shire of Cocos	unicameral	7	—	—	7	596	85	85
Vatican City	Pontifical Commission for Vatican City State	unicameral	7	—	—	7	842	120	120

== See also ==
- List of legislatures by country
- Cube root law
