= D.D. Johnston =

Scottish novelist

Michael Darren David Johnston
- Born: 1979 (age 46–47); Edinburgh, Scotland

Michael Darren David Johnston, known as D.D. Johnston, (born 1979) is a Scottish political novelist. He currently lives in Cheltenham, England. The left-wing British newspaper the Morning Star called him "one of this country’s most principled socialist novelists" and "also one of the most versatile and talented around." He was born in Edinburgh, Scotland, and attended university there.

== Novels ==
Johnston's first novel, Peace, Love & Petrol Bombs, from the anarchist publisher AK Press in Oakland, California, was selected as a Herald Book of the Year by Helen Fitzgerald. It has been translated into Spanish as Paz, amor y cócteles molotov (Hoja de Lata, 2013). Johnston's second, The Deconstruction of Professor Thrub, from Barbican Press, was written for a PhD in Creative Writing at the University of Gloucestershire.

A third novel, The Secret Baby Room, was published in July 2015. It is a psychological thriller set in Manchester. The author commented: "It’s taken me slightly longer to finish it than it took the Achaeans to fight the Trojan War. I hope it’s worth the wait."

His novel "Disnaeland" was published in hardback by Barbican Press in 2022. The Financial Times summed it up pretty fully in a short space: 'DD Johnston's Disnaeland, a comedic dystopia set in a small Scottish town, is all profanity and colloquial dialect. When civilisation collapses, a community struggles to unite and rebuild. Bringing light to a dark world is no mean feat, but the characters in the novel do just that, and so does the author. From the cunning pun of its title onward, Disnaeland is a scabrous treat.' The book gives us a Scottish utopia, in the spirit of what D.D.Johnston professes about his work on his publisher's website: 'the consistent theme is his love for ordinary people, and his faith in the extraordinary things we can achieve together.'

== Lecturing ==
Johnston is a senior lecturer in creative writing at the University of Gloucestershire.
