= Ludwig Krämer =

German academic and former public servant

Ludwig Krämer (born 1939) is a German academic and former public servant who is active in the field of environmental law at national, regional and international levels and in particular in the European Community. He is the author of over 150 articles on environmental law, principally concerned with European Community/European Union environmental law. He retired from the European Commission in 2004. He currently teaches European Environmental Law in several universities.

== Education ==
Krämer was educated at the University of Kiel and München, where he studied law and history (1960 - 1964). He was an official trainee in Germany and France (1964 - 1968) and sat for the State examination in law in 1968 in Hamburg, Germany. He holds a PhD in EC consumer law, from the University of Hamburg.

== Public service career ==
His career commenced as a research associate for Kiel University in 1968. From 1969 until his retirement from the position in 2004, Dr Krämer was a Judge with Landgericht, Kiel.

Krämer was in the employment of the European Commission from 1972 - 2004. In 1972, he joined as an official with the Commission in the Competition Directorate-General (D-G). In this role he dealt principally with consumer protection issues.

Krämer was to start his involvement in shaping environmental policies and legislation in the EC when he moved into the Directorate-General for the Environment (European Commission) (D-G Environment) in 1984. Between 1987 and 1994, Krämer was head of the Legal Unit. His next position was as head of the Waste Management Unit. Krämer was influential in directing European environmental law and policy, given his breadth of knowledge and fluency in approximately 8 official European languages, many of which he was able to draft legislation in.

In 2001, Krämer was made head of the unit on Environmental Governance in D-G Environment. In this capacity, he was an advocate for the environment, championing the need for transparency, accountability and public participation in the field of environmental protection.

He retired from this position in August 2004, to pursue an active academic career.

== Academia and publications ==
Krämer has authored around 20 books and handbooks and approximately 150 articles on EC environmental law. His "EU Environmental Law" is now in its 8th edition (2016).

As at 2006, Krämer is a professor in European and German environmental law at the University of Bremen. He is a visiting professor at University College London. He also lectures at College of Europe, Bruges in Belgium. He also teaches at a number of other universities, including those located in Copenhagen, Ghent, Pécs, Stockholm, Seville, London and Montreal.

A "liber amicorum" for Ludwig Krämer has been published: Richard Macrory (Ed.): Reflections on 30 Years of EU Environmental Law - A High Level of Protection, Europa Law Publishing, Groningen (NL), 2006.
