= Simon Young (mayor) =

English-born Pitcairnese politician (born 1965)

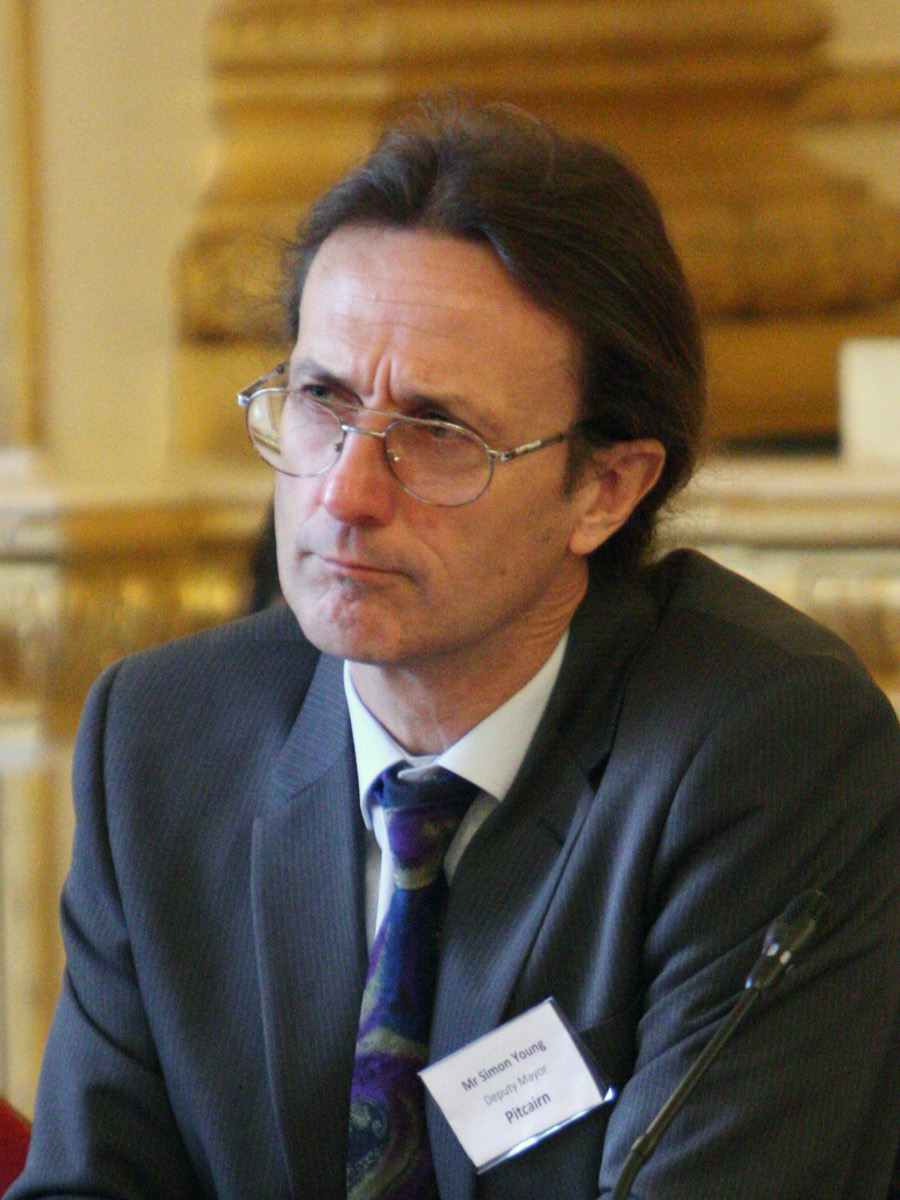
- Young in 2012

6th Mayor of Pitcairn Islands
- In office 1 January 2023 – 31 December 2025
- Monarch: Charles III
- Governor: Iona Thomas
- Preceded by: Charlene Warren-Peu
- Succeeded by: Shawn Christian

Deputy Mayor of Pitcairn
- In office 1 January 2010 – 31 December 2013
- Succeeded by: Brenda Christian

Personal details
- Born: 1965 (age 60–61) Pickering, North Yorkshire, England

Simon Young (born 1965) is a British politician who served as the Mayor of Pitcairn from 2023 to 2025, the first non-native Pitcairn Islander to hold the position. Prior to this, he served as Deputy Mayor from 2009 to 2013.

== Biography ==
Simon Young was born in 1965. Originally from Pickering in North Yorkshire, Young served in the Royal Air Force for ten years. After leaving the air force he wanted to travel the world and was interested in the Pitcairn Islands. In order to visit the island Young had to ask for permission from the island's council in writing. Young visited Pitcairn in 1992, and it took him nine days to sail from Auckland, New Zealand, to the Pitcairn Islands.

In 1999, Young and his wife Shirley, who was from the United States, permanently moved to the Pitcairn Islands. He is editor of the island's newspaper The Pitcairn Miscellany.

Young was elected as Deputy Mayor in the 2009 Pitcairnese general election and served under Mayor Mike Warren. He ran for the mayoralty in the 2013 elections, losing by one vote in the third round of voting to Shawn Christian after the two candidates had been tied in the first two rounds. He later served as the magistrate of the islands.

In the 2022 mayoral election Young was elected mayor by 19 votes to 16, becoming the first non-native to head the island's government. Due to the island's small population, he personally knew every voter. During his tenure as mayor he has sought to increase the population of the islands by encouraging immigration. He bears no relation to Simon Young, who was magistrate of the Pitcairn Islands in 1849. He was present for the coronation of Charles III and Camilla.

== Works cited ==
=== Journal ===
- Clegg, Peter (2025). "Pitcairn". The Contemporary Pacific. 36 (1). University of Hawaiʻi Press: 155–60. doi:10.1353/cp.2024.a956795.

=== News ===
- Bradley, Jane (24 November 2022). "How a remote Pacific island named after a Scot has just elected its first non-native leader". The Scotsman. Archived from the original on 16 June 2025.
- Cumming, Ed (28 April 2024). "The mayor who swapped Pickering for the Pitcairns – and wants you to join him". The Daily Telegraph. Archived from the original on 16 June 2025.
- Gay, Edward (6 December 2021). "Pitcairn's former mayor guilty of public indecency charges after walking naked through town". Stuff. Archived from the original on 16 June 2025.
- Scott, Geraldine (19 November 2022). "Meet Simon Young, the Pitcairn Islands' exotic new mayor (from Yorkshire)". The Times. Archived from the original on 16 June 2025.

=== Web ===
- "Election". High Commission of the United Kingdom, Wellington. Archived from the original on 17 October 2012.
- "Pitcairn Islands Study Center". Pacific Union College. Archived from the original on 16 June 2025.
- "The Pitcairn Island Government". Pacific Union College. Archived from the original on 13 May 2025.
