= Laura Clarke =

British diplomat (born 1978)

Laura Clarke OBE
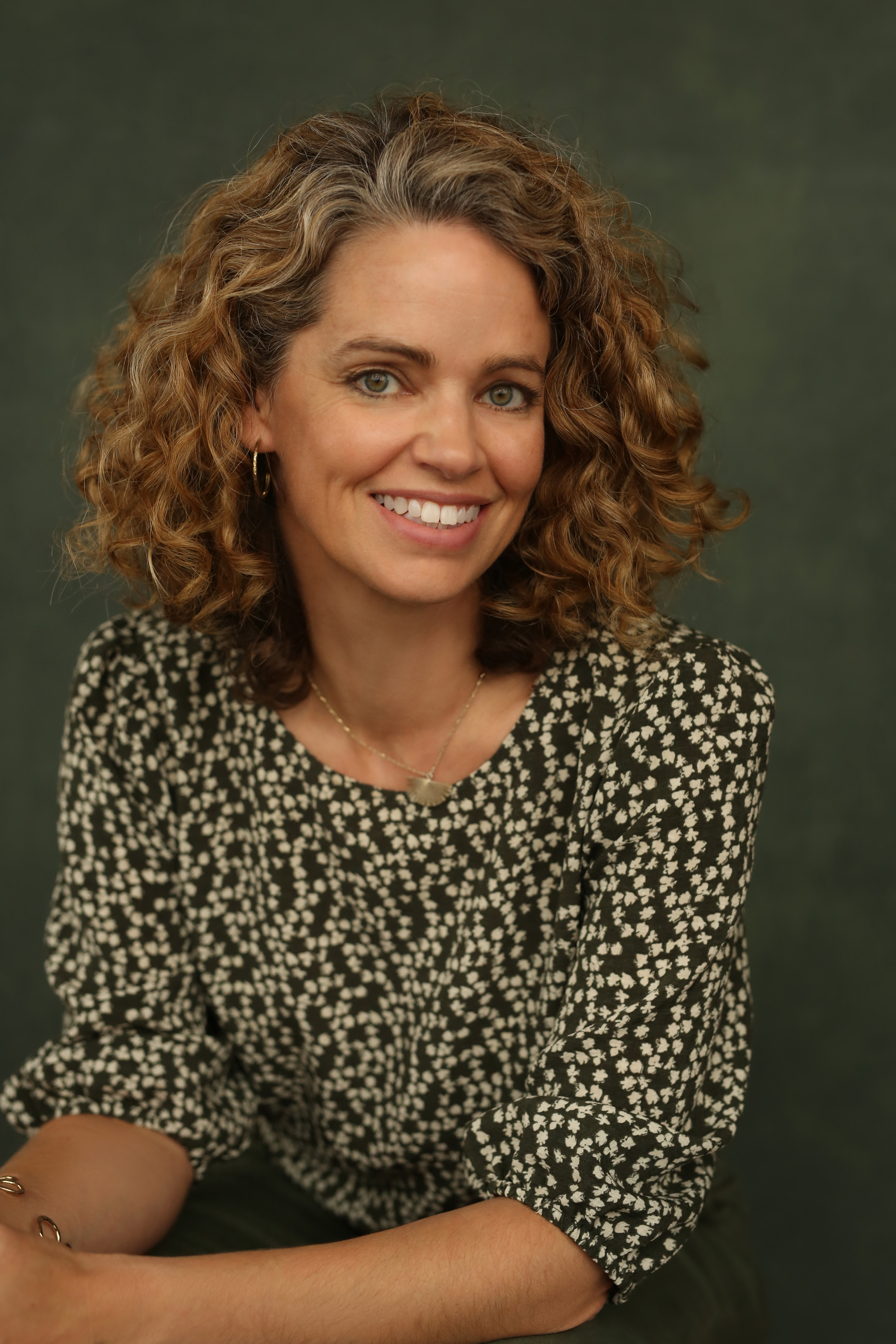
- Clarke in 2025

Governor of Pitcairn
- In office 25 January 2018 – 7 July 2022
- Monarch: Elizabeth II
- Preceded by: Robin Shackell
- Succeeded by: Iona Thomas

British High Commissioner to New Zealand
- In office 25 January 2018 – 7 July 2022
- Monarch: Elizabeth II
- Prime Minister: Theresa May; Boris Johnson
- Preceded by: Jonathan Sinclair
- Succeeded by: Iona Thomas

Personal details
- Born: 3 June 1978 (age 48)
- Spouse: Toby Fisher
- Children: 3, including Nell Fisher
- Education: University of Cambridge; London School of Economics
- Occupation: Diplomat; CEO

Laura Mary Clarke OBE (born 3 June 1978) is the CEO of ClientEarth, a global non-profit environmental law organisation. She is a former British diplomat, who served as the British High Commissioner to New Zealand, and the Governor of Pitcairn.

== Biography ==
Clarke is the CEO of ClientEarth, a legal environmental NGO with 300 staff across Europe, Africa and Asia. She took over from the Founder of ClientEarth, James Thornton in September 2022. As CEO, Laura has oversight of ClientEarth's litigation, advocacy and partnership work, leads ClientEarth's growth in new markets, and spearheads global fundraising. She featured in Time Magazine's Climate 100 (2024), and Reuters' 'Trailblazing Women in Climate' (2024).

Clarke was High Commissioner to New Zealand, and Governor of the Pitcairn Islands from 2018-2022 and non-Resident British High Commissioner to Samoa from March 2018 to December 2019, when the British Government established a Resident High Commission in Samoa.

In her role as High Commissioner to New Zealand, Clarke placed an emphasis on strengthening relations with Māori of New Zealand. In November 2018 the British High Commission employed its first Māori adviser and also a language teacher for Clarke. In October 2019 Clarke expressed regret, on behalf of the British Government, for the killing of 9 Māori during the first encounters with the crew of James Cook's Endeavour.

In July 2020, Clarke launched UK-New Zealand Free Trade Agreement Negotiations alongside PM Jacinda Ardern and NZ Trade Minister David Parker.

Clarke hosted the British High Commission podcast, 'Tea with the High Commission', with guests including Jacinda Ardern, actor Sam Neill and comedian Eddie Izzard.

As Governor of Pitcairn, Clarke had oversight of governance and economic support for the Pitcairn Islands. She and her husband made a film of her first visit.

Prior to her posting to New Zealand, Clarke served as the UK Government's India Co-ordinator and Head of the South Asia Department in the Foreign and Commonwealth Office. While serving in these roles she was ranked as one of the most influential people in UK-India relations. Other roles included Political Counsellor in Pretoria, South Africa, Chief of Staff to the Minister for Europe, and roles in the Ministry of Justice, British Parliament and European Commission.

Clarke is married to Toby Fisher, a New Zealander, and they have three children, one of whom is actress Nell Fisher.

She was appointed Officer of the Order of the British Empire (OBE) in the 2021 New Year Honours for services to British foreign policy.

Diplomatic posts
Preceded by Jonathan Sinclair	High Commissioner of the United Kingdom to New Zealand; 2018–2022	Succeeded by Iona Thomas
