= Mother Meera =

Indian mystic (born 1960)

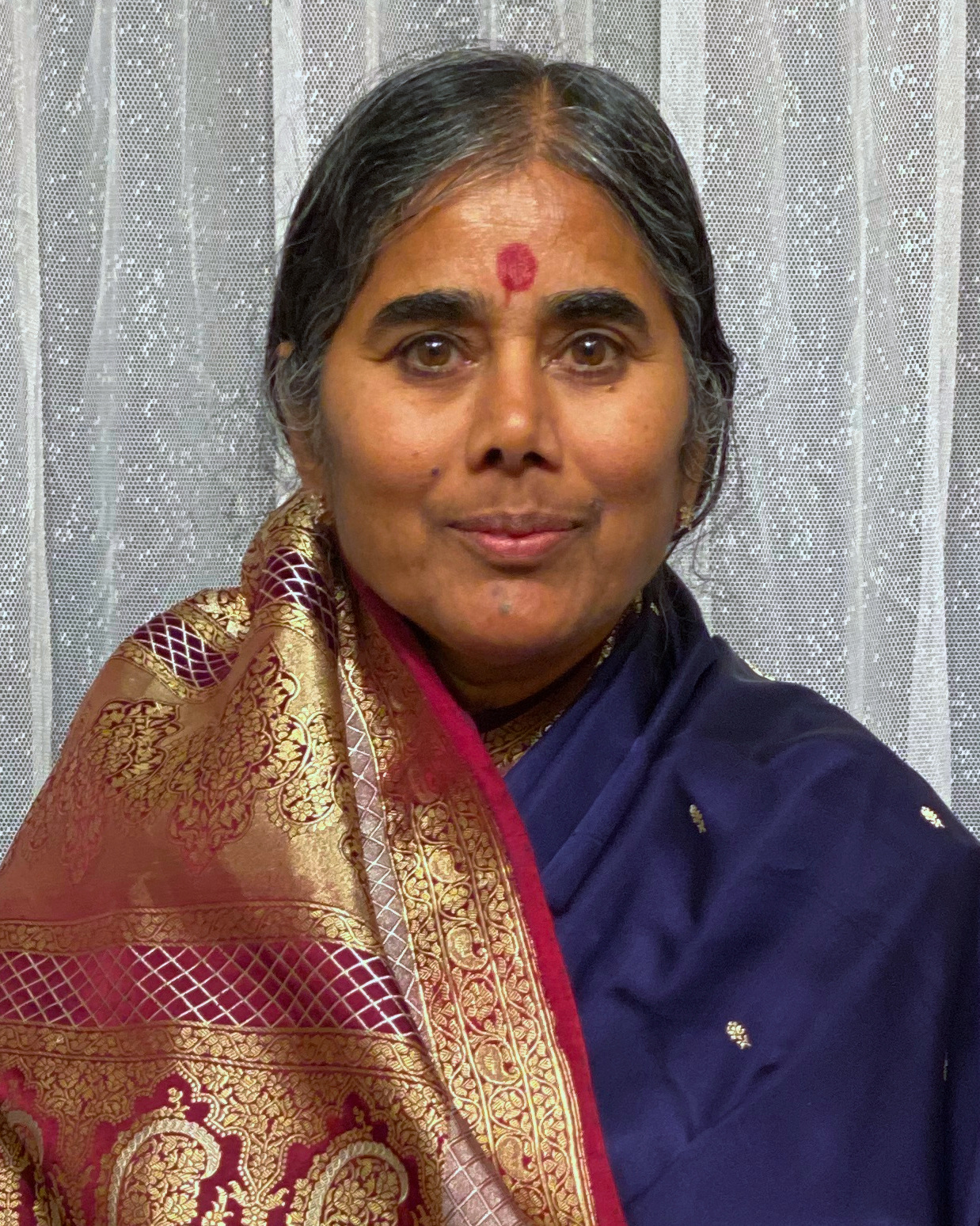
- Mother Meera

Personal life
- Born: Kamala Reddy; 26 December 1960 (age 65) Chandepalle, Telangana, India

Religious life
- Religion: Hinduism

Mother Meera (born Kamala Reddy on 26 December, 1960 in Chandepalle, a small village in the Yadadri Bhuvanagiri district of Telangana, India) is an Indian spiritual teacher and author living in Germany. She gives darshan, a silent blessing, and meditations in Germany and many other countries to which she travels. Although she does not consider herself a guru, and does not promote a particular religion, she is considered a contemporary female saint of India in the Anglo-European hemisphere. She is referred to by followers as an avatar.

== Life account ==
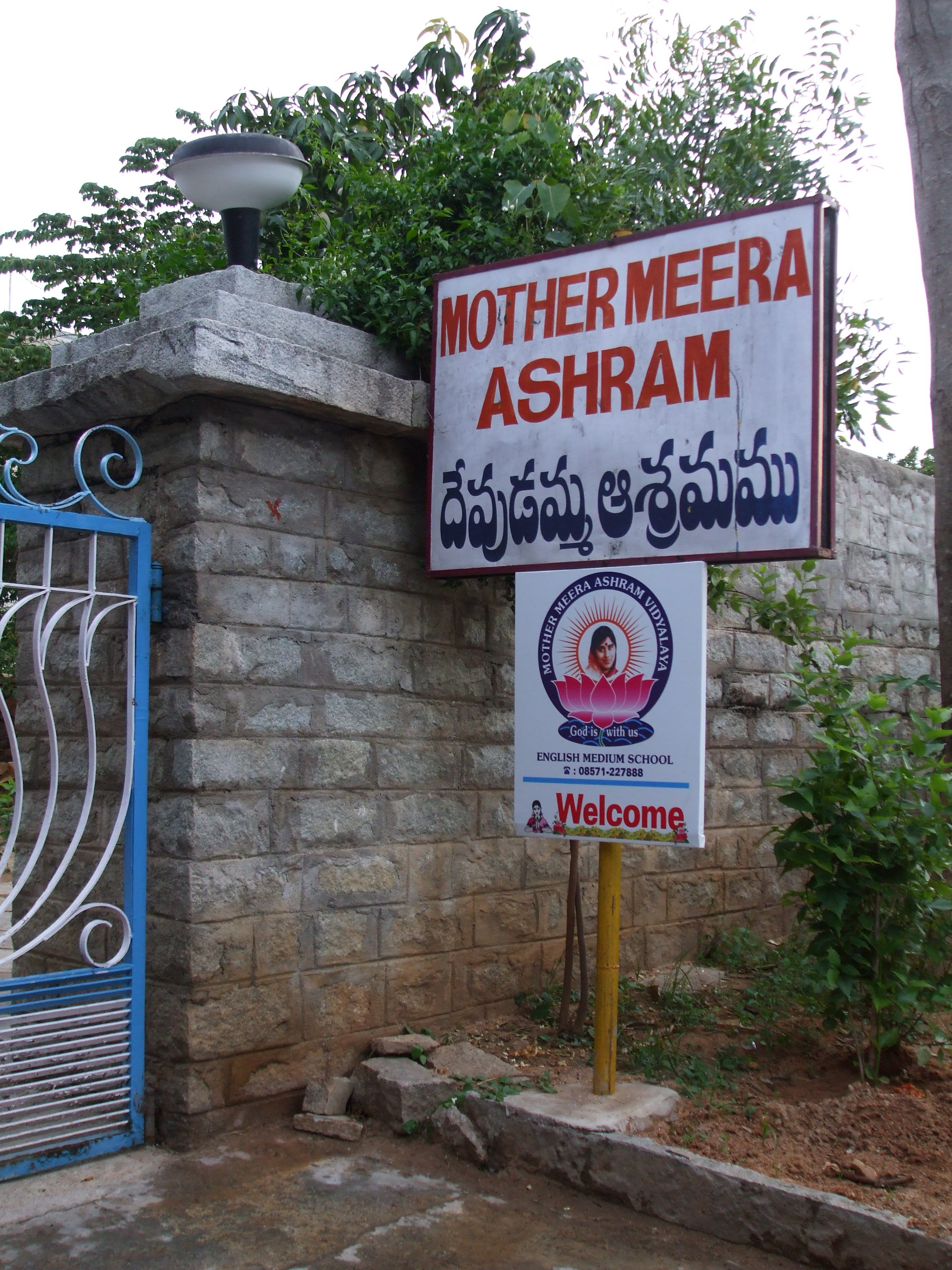
Mother Meera Ashram, Madanapalle, A.P., India

Mother Meera allegedly had her first samādhi, a state of complete spiritual absorption, at the age of six, which lasted for a whole day. Her uncle Bulgur Venkat Reddy met her for the first time when she was 11 years old and recognized her as the girl of his visions. He became convinced that she was the divine mother, and he took her under his wing. In 1974, he first brought her to the Sri Aurobindo Ashram in Pondicherry, of which he was a member. A few months later, he took her to a girls' school, where she stayed for about two years.

In 1976, she returned to Pondicherry. There she met the first visitors from the West and began giving darshan. In 1979, she was invited by her first followers to Montreal, Canada, where she gave darshan to larger audiences. She returned there several times. In 1981, she visited Germany, and a year later, she settled there and married a German. Uncle Reddy died in 1985 and was buried in the local cemetery in Dornburg-Thalheim, Hesse. She currently gives darshan at the "Waldecker Hof," the former outbuilding of Schaumburg Castle in Balduinstein, which has been converted into a hotel.

== Activities ==
Mother Meera receives thousands of visitors for darshan, which takes place in silence. During darshan, she touches visitors on the temples and then looks into their eyes. She does not give lectures.

According to her teachings, her task is to bring down the Paramatman light (described as the "light of the highest Self"). According to her teachings, one can open oneself to this light through japa, the mental repetition of a divine name or mantra. This practice can be done informally. Her teachings are associated with bhakti, the path of loving, emotional devotion to the Divine, in which she embraces all names and forms of God.

About the light she says:

Like electricity, the Light is everywhere, but one must know how to activate it. I have come for that.

She does not claim to be a guru or have followers. To be connected to her work, people do not have to recognise her. Mother Meera does not belong to any particular Indian tradition. However, her work has a certain affinity with Aurobindo.

== Trivia ==
According to an article in Entertainment Weekly in 1994, Madonna's global hit "Secret" was inspired by Mother Meera.

== Critics ==
After splitting from Mother Meera, the writer and former follower Andrew Harvey wrote The Sun at Midnight. In it, Harvey accused Meera of homophobia, saying that Mother Meera disapproved of Harvey's marriage to another man. In his first book about her, Hidden Journey, Harvey had originally praised her as an avatar, attributing his own claimed enlightenment to her. Harvey's accusation of homophobia is disputed. One of Harvey's former lovers, the writer Mark Matousek (1997), said that: "I do know that the idea that she's homophobic is completely ridiculous. For God's sake, we were served breakfast in bed together in her house."

== Books ==
- Answers, Part I – by Mother Meera, ISBN 0-9622973-3-X
- Answers, Part II – by Mother Meera, ISBN 3-9805475-5-8

== Quotes ==
"One common mistake is to think that one reality is the reality. You must always be prepared to leave one reality for a greater one." – Answers, Part I

== See also ==
- Mirabai
