= Iona Thomas =

British diplomat

Her Excellency Iona Thomas OBE
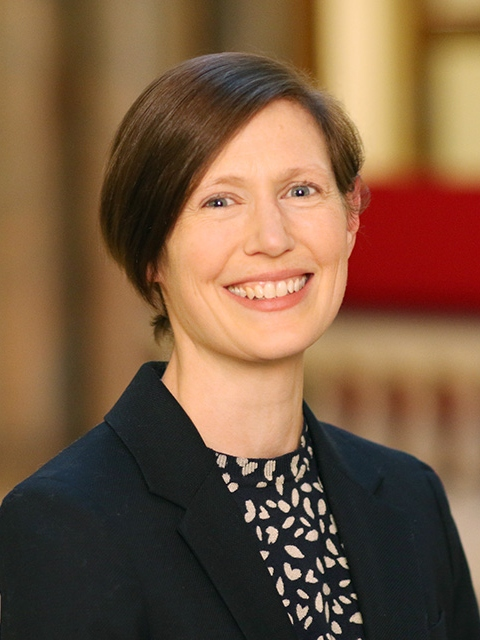
- Thomas in 2021

British High Commissioner to New Zealand
- In office 3 August 2022 – April 2026
- Monarchs: Elizabeth II; Charles III
- Preceded by: Laura Clarke
- Succeeded by: Louise Cantillon

Governor of Pitcairn
- In office 8 August 2022 – April 2026
- Monarchs: Elizabeth II; Charles III
- Prime Minister: Boris Johnson; Liz Truss; Rishi Sunak; Keir Starmer
- Preceded by: Laura Clarke
- Succeeded by: Louise Cantillon

Personal details
- Education: Oxford University; London School of Economics
- Occupation: Diplomat; government official

Iona Thomas is a British diplomat and ministry official who has served as Director Multilateral and Human Rights at the Foreign, Commonwealth and Development Office since 2026. She previously served as the British High Commissioner to New Zealand and Governor of Pitcairn from 2022 to 2026.

Thomas did a bachelor’s in literae humaniores at Oxford University and a master's in economics at the London School of Economics. She worked for the Department for Communities and Local Government in counter terrorism before moving to the Foreign and Commonwealth Office. She was Political Counsellor at the British High Commission in Pakistan and has served in diplomatic posts in Tripoli and at the United Nations in New York. In June 2018, she was appointed an Officer of the Order of the British Empire for services to British foreign policy.

In August 2022, Thomas took up the position of British High Commissioner to New Zealand, succeeding Laura Clarke. Shortly after her appointment she attended the funeral of Queen Elizabeth II in London. As High Commissioner she advocated for AUKUS, and also welcomed higher defence spending by New Zealand. She also worked to strengthen ties with iwi, and advocated for a rules-based international order. In her parallel role as Governor of Pitcairn she visited the island to open a marine science laboratory in October 2023.

Thomas resigned as British High Commissioner to New Zealand in April 2026 in order to assume her position of leadership at the Foreign, Commonwealth and Development Office.
