= Island Council (Pitcairn) =

Legislature of the Pitcairn Islands

Coordinates: 25.0662°S 130.1005°W

Leadership
- Governor: Louise Cantillon
- Mayor: Shawn Christian
- Administrator: Andy Brown
- Seats: 7 voting, 3 ex-officio

Elections
- Last election: 2025 Pitcairnese general election

The Island Council is the legislature of the Pitcairn Islands, a British Overseas Territory in the Pacific Ocean. The Island Council is a democratic, elected body formed of ten members.

== Structure ==
The Council has ten members. Seven of these (five Councillors, the Mayor, and the Deputy Mayor) are elected by popular vote, and are the only members allowed to vote at Council meetings. The other three are ex-officio members: the Administrator (who serves as both the head of government and the representative of the Governor of the Pitcairn Islands), the Governor, and the Deputy Governor. The Councillors and the Deputy Mayor all serve two year terms. The Mayor is elected for three years and is eligible to serve a second term in office, whilst the Administrator is appointed by the Governor for an indefinite term.

The council has approximately one member for every five people on Pitcairn, making it the most representative official legislature of any country, non-sovereign entity, or unrecognized state in the world.

== History ==
The presiding officer of the council was traditionally the Magistrate, who held executive, legislative, and judicial authority. Following a constitutional review in 1998, this office was divided and replaced by the Mayor and the council chairman, effective from 1999.

Until 2011 the Governor appointed a second member of the Council. However, this position was scrapped in favour of introducing the fifth elected seat.

== Council membership ==
As of January 2026, the composition of the Island Council was:

Voting members:

- Mayor: Shawn Christian
- Deputy Mayor: Charlene Warren-Peu
- Councillors: Michele Christian, Torika Christian, Melva Evans, Shirley Young, Simon Young

Non-voting (ex-officio) Members:

- Administrator: Rachael Midlen
- Governor: Louise Cantillon
- Deputy Governor: Alasdair Hamilton
