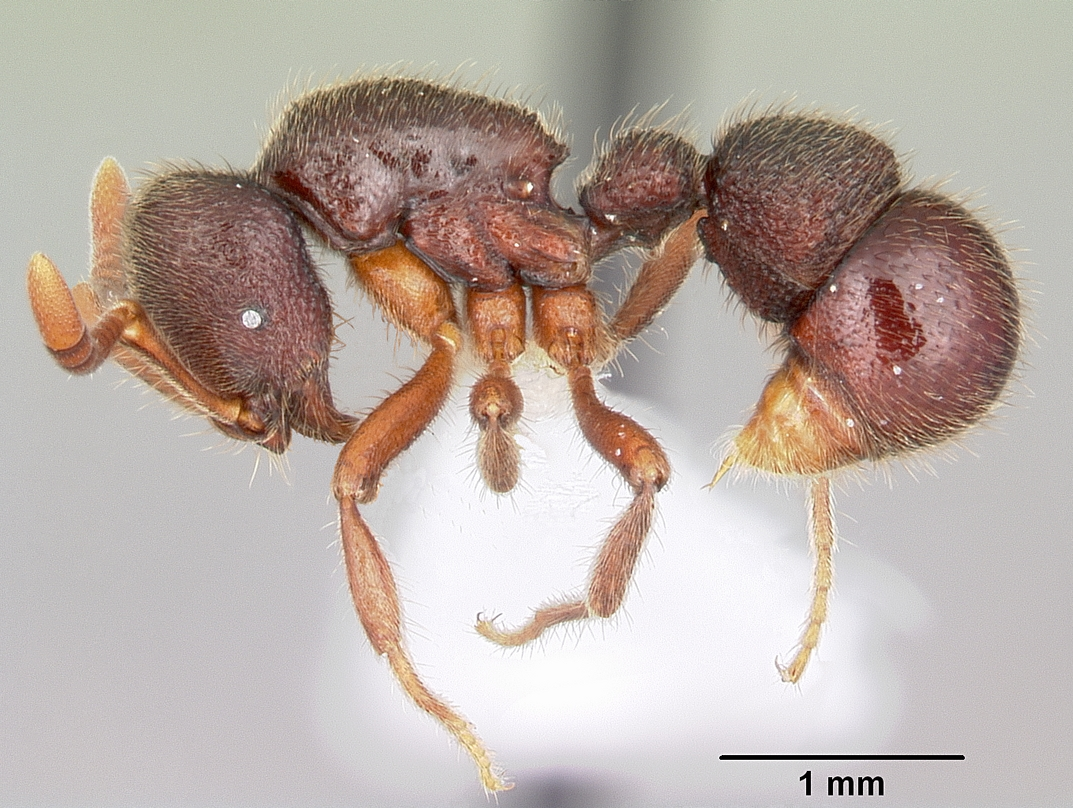
- Proceratium google worker, holotype specimen

Scientific classification
- Domain: Eukaryota
- Kingdom: Animalia
- Phylum: Arthropoda
- Class: Insecta
- Order: Hymenoptera
- Family: Formicidae
- Subfamily: Proceratiinae
- Tribe: Proceratiini
- Genus: Proceratium; Roger, 1863

Type species
- Proceratium silaceum Roger, 1863

Diversity
- 82 species

Synonyms
- Sysphingta Roger, 1863

= Proceratium =

Genus of ants

Proceratium is a rare genus of ants in the subfamily Proceratiinae. It is the type genus of the tribe Proceratiini, which in addition to Proceratium consists of two even rarer genera: the extant Discothyrea and the fossil genus Bradoponera.

== Distribution ==
The genus is rare, but widespread throughout the northern temperate and tropical zones. In the Old World, it is distributed from Spain to Japan, in sub-Saharan Africa, Mauritius, the Malay Archipelago, New Guinea, Queensland (Australia) and Fiji. In the New World, it is known from Canada to Brazil (and some Caribbean islands).

== Biology ==
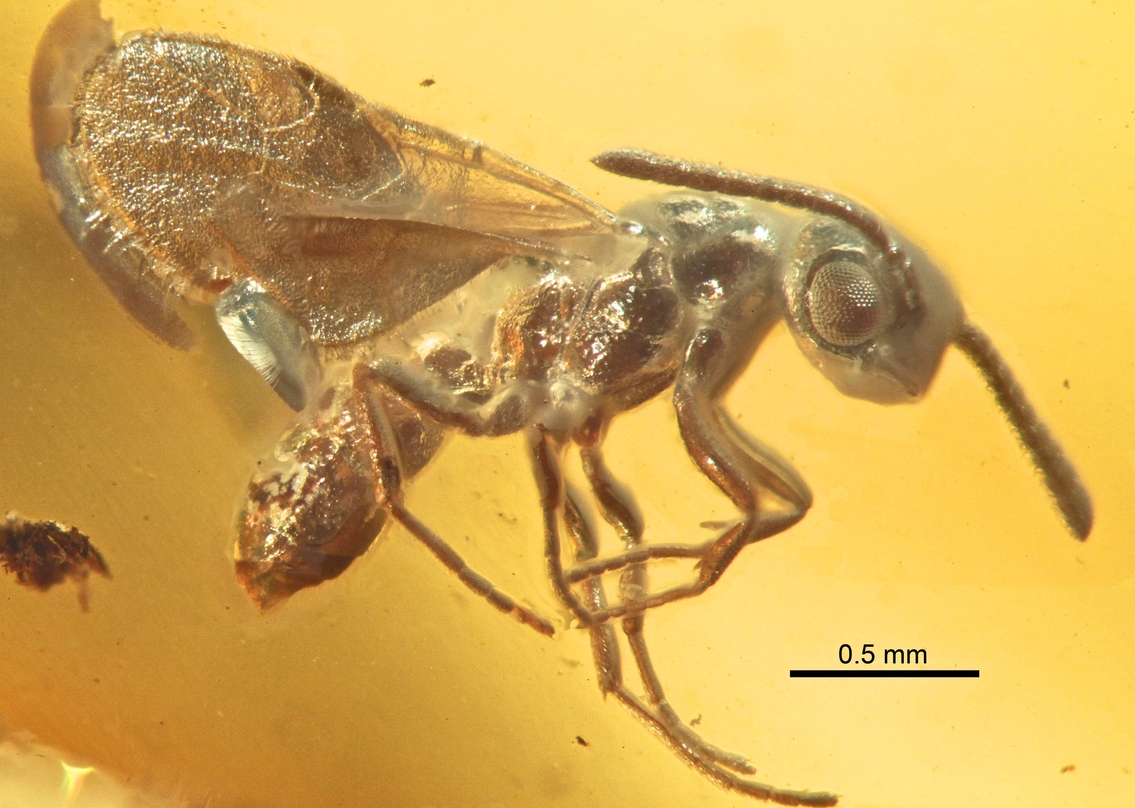
P. eocenicum male

Colonies are relatively small, usually containing less than 200 individuals. They nest in soil, in rotten wood, under stones, or on tree branches. Similar to its sister genus Discothyrea, some species are specialist predators of arthropod eggs, mainly spider eggs.

== Species ==
- Proceratium algiricum Forel, 1899
- Proceratium angulinode Baroni Urbani & De Andrade, 2003
- Proceratium arnoldi Forel, 1913
- Proceratium australe Baroni Urbani & De Andrade, 2003
- Proceratium austronesicum Baroni Urbani & De Andrade, 2003
- Proceratium avium Brown, 1974
- Proceratium banjaranense Baroni Urbani & De Andrade, 2003
- Proceratium boltoni Leston, 1971
- Proceratium brasiliense Borgmeier, 1959
- Proceratium bruelheidei Staab, Garcia, Liu, Xu, & Economo, 2018
- Proceratium burundense Baroni Urbani & De Andrade, 2003
- Proceratium caledonicum Baroni Urbani & De Andrade, 2003
- Proceratium californicum Cook, 1953
- Proceratium catio Baroni Urbani & De Andrade, 2003
- Proceratium cavinodus Baroni Urbani & De Andrade, 2003
- Proceratium chickasaw Baroni Urbani & De Andrade, 2003
- Proceratium colombicum Baroni Urbani & De Andrade, 2003
- Proceratium compitale Ward, 1988
- Proceratium confinium Baroni Urbani & De Andrade, 2003
- Proceratium convexiceps Borgmeier, 1957
- Proceratium crassicorne Emery, 1895
- Proceratium creek Baroni Urbani & De Andrade, 2003
- Proceratium croceum (Roger, 1860)
- Proceratium cubanum Baroni Urbani & De Andrade, 2003
- Proceratium dayak Baroni Urbani & De Andrade, 2003
- Proceratium deelemani Perrault, 1981
- †Proceratium denticulatum Lattke, 1991
- Proceratium diplopyx Brown, 1980
- †Proceratium dominicanum Baroni Urbani & De Andrade, 2003
- Proceratium dusun Baroni Urbani & De Andrade, 2003
- Proceratium ecuadoriense Baroni Urbani & De Andrade, 2003
- †Proceratium eocenicum Dlussky, 2009
- Proceratium foveolatum Baroni Urbani & De Andrade, 2003
- Proceratium galilaeum Baroni Urbani & De Andrade, 2003
- †Proceratium gibberum Baroni Urbani & De Andrade, 2003
- Proceratium gigas Baroni Urbani & De Andrade, 2003
- Proceratium goliath Kempf & Brown, 1968
- Proceratium google Fisher, 2005
- Proceratium gracile Baroni Urbani & De Andrade, 2003
- Proceratium hirsutum Baroni Urbani & De Andrade, 2003
- Proceratium itoi (Forel, 1918)
- Proceratium ivimka Baroni Urbani & De Andrade, 2003
- Proceratium japonicum Santschi, 1937
- Proceratium lattkei Baroni Urbani & De Andrade, 2003
- Proceratium lombokense Emery, 1897
- Proceratium longigaster Karavaiev, 1935
- Proceratium longiscapus Baroni Urbani & De Andrade, 2003
- Proceratium longmenense Xu, 2006
- Proceratium lunatum Terron, 1981
- Proceratium malesianum Baroni Urbani & De Andrade, 2003
- Proceratium mancum Mann, 1922
- Proceratium melinum (Roger, 1860)
- Proceratium melitense Baroni Urbani & De Andrade, 2003
- Proceratium mexicanum Baroni Urbani & De Andrade, 2003
- Proceratium micrommatum (Roger, 1863)
- Proceratium microsculptum Baroni Urbani & De Andrade, 2003
- Proceratium morisitai Onoyama & Yoshimura, 2002
- Proceratium nujiangense Xu, 2006
- Proceratium numidicum Santschi, 1912
- Proceratium oceanicum Baroni Urbani & De Andrade, 2003
- Proceratium panamense Baroni Urbani & De Andrade, 2003
- Proceratium papuanum Emery, 1897
- Proceratium pergandei (Emery, 1895)
- †Proceratium petrosum Dlussky, Rasnitsyn & Perfilieva, 2015
- †Proceratium poinari Baroni Urbani & De Andrade, 2003
- Proceratium politum Baroni Urbani & De Andrade, 2003
- Proceratium pumilio Baroni Urbani & De Andrade, 2003
- Proceratium relictum Mann, 1921
- Proceratium robustum Baroni Urbani & De Andrade, 2003
- Proceratium siamense Baroni Urbani & De Andrade, 2003
- Proceratium silaceum Roger, 1863
- Proceratium snellingi Baroni Urbani & De Andrade, 2003
- Proceratium stictum Brown, 1958
- Proceratium striativenter Baroni Urbani & De Andrade, 2003
- Proceratium sulawense Baroni Urbani & De Andrade, 2003
- Proceratium taino Baroni Urbani & De Andrade, 2003
- Proceratium terraealtae Baroni Urbani & De Andrade, 2003
- Proceratium terroni Bolton, 1995
- Proceratium tio Snelling & Cover, 1992
- Proceratium toschii (Consani, 1951)
- Proceratium transitionis Baroni Urbani & De Andrade, 2003
- Proceratium vinaka Hita Garcia, Sarnat, & Economo, 2015
- Proceratium watasei (Wheeler, 1906)
- Proceratium williamsi Mathew & Tiwari, 2000
- Proceratium zhaoi Xu, 2000
