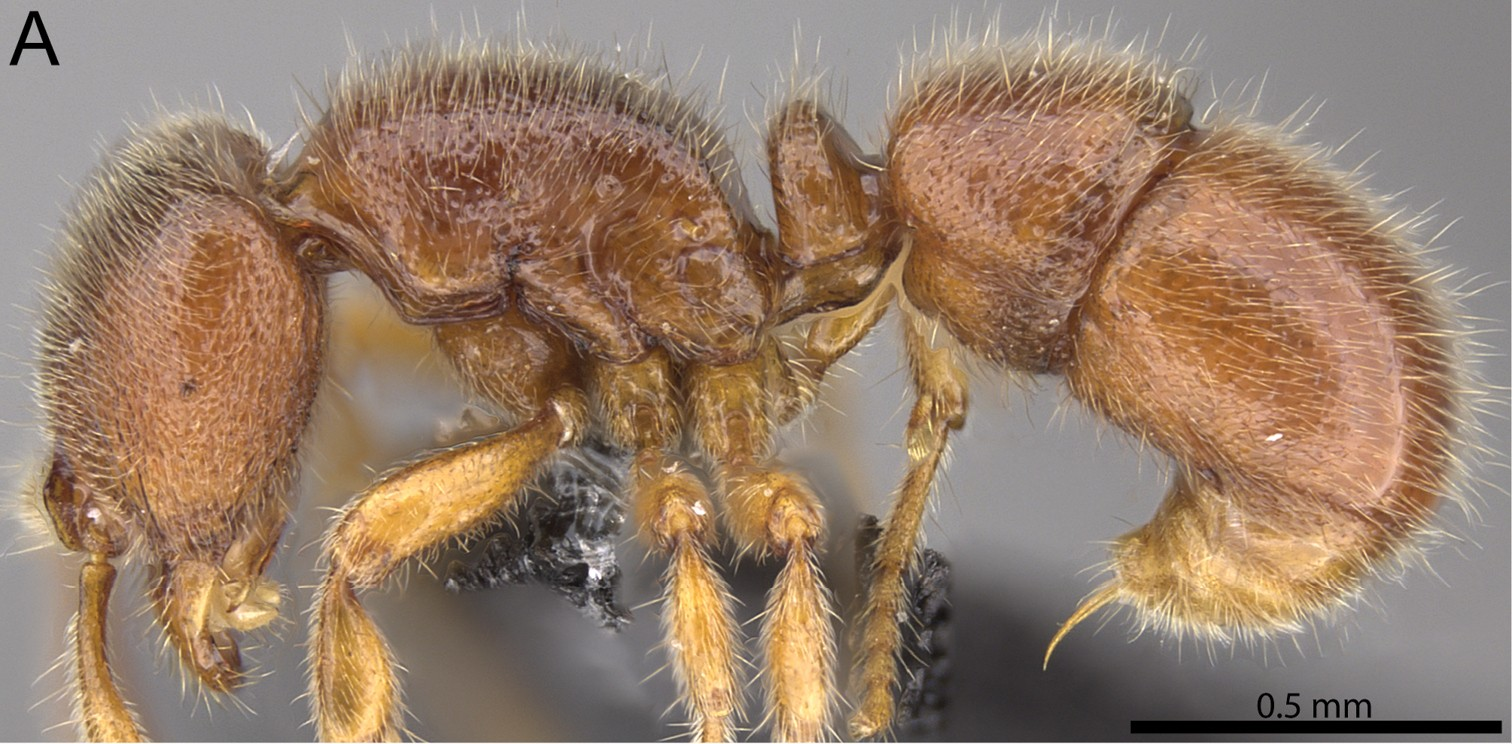
- Proceratium vinaka worker

Scientific classification
- Domain: Eukaryota
- Kingdom: Animalia
- Phylum: Arthropoda
- Class: Insecta
- Order: Hymenoptera
- Family: Formicidae
- Genus: Proceratium
- Species: P. vinaka

Binomial name
- Proceratium vinaka Hita Garcia, Sarnat, & Economo, 2015

= Proceratium vinaka =

Species of ant

Proceratium vinaka is a species of ant from Fiji, and the third species of its genus to be identified there.

== Etymology ==
The specific name is derived from the Fijian word meaning "thank you" or "hello".

== Description ==
Workers of the species measure 2.41 mm long, making it one of the smaller species of its clade. The species has small eyes. The legs are long. The body is a yellowish or light orange brown, densely covered in short hairs, but with longer, erect hairs interspersed.

== Range and habitat ==
The species is only known from Mount Tomanivi on the Fijian island of Viti Levu, but is believed to also inhabit the islands of Taveuni and Vanua Levu.

Individuals were collected from leaf litter and decaying wood from undisturbed rainforest half way up the mountain.

== Phylogeny ==
P. vinaka is part of the P. silaceum clade.
