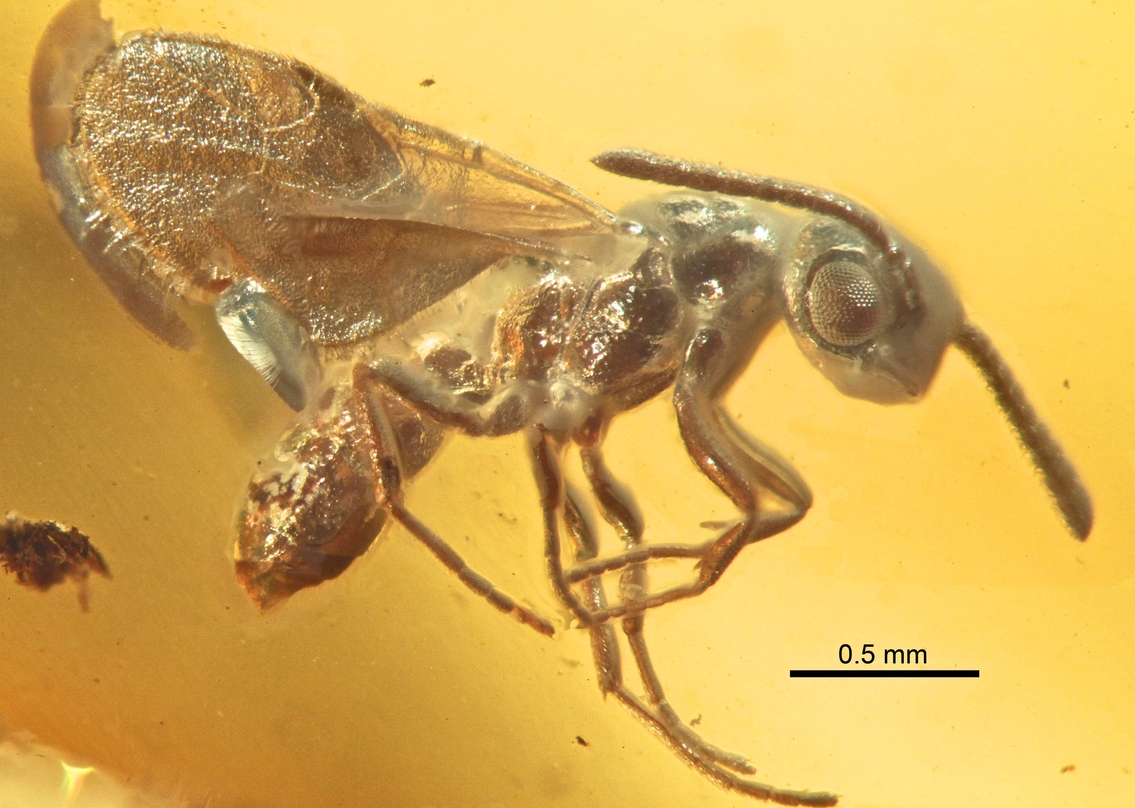
- P. eocenicum paratype male

Scientific classification
- Domain: Eukaryota
- Kingdom: Animalia
- Phylum: Arthropoda
- Class: Insecta
- Order: Hymenoptera
- Family: Formicidae
- Genus: Proceratium
- Species: †P. eocenicum

Binomial name
- †Proceratium eocenicum Dlussky, 2009

= Proceratium eocenicum =

Proceratium eocenicum Temporal range: Middle Eocene

Extinct species of ant

Proceratium eocenicum is an extinct species of formicid in the ant subfamily Proceratiinae known from fossils found in the Baltic region.

== History and classification ==
P. eocenicum is known from two fossil specimens of adult males. The fossils were discovered preserved as inclusions in transparent chunks of Baltic amber. Baltic amber is approximately forty six million years old, having been deposited during Lutetian stage of the Middle Eocene. There is debate on what plant family the amber was produced by, with macrofossil and microflossil evidence suggesting a Pinus relative, while chemical and spectroscopic evidence suggests Agathis or Sciadopitys. The paleoenvironment of the Eocene Baltic forests where the P. eocenicum lived was that of humid temperate to subtropical islands. The forests were composed of mostly Quercus and Pinus species, while the lower sections of the forests had paratropical plant elements, such as palms.

At the time of description, the holotype male, number MZ PAN, no. 18097 was preserved in the Museum of the Earth collections, part of the Polish Academy of Sciences. The paratype male, (CGC, no. 3306) was part of the Carsten Gröhn private collection as CGC no.3306, and subsequently deposited in the Geological-Paleontological Institute and Museum at the University of Hamburg as specimen GPIH, no. 4507. The fossil was first described by the Russian paleomyrmecologist Gennady Dlussky in a paper on the ant subfamilies Ponerinae, Cerapachyinae, and Pseudomyrmecinae in European Eocene ambers. In the type description, Dlussky named the species P. eocenicum, with the specific epithet derived from "Eocene" as a reference to the age of the amber.

As of 2015, six species of Proceratium had been described from fossils. P. denticulatum, P. dominicanum, P. gibberum and P. poinari are younger than P. eocenicum, being described from the Middle Miocene Dominican amber. P. petrosum, the first species to be described from a compression fossil, is from diatomite deposits of the Bol’shaya Svetlovodnaya site on the Pacific coast of Russia. P. eocenicum is of similar age to P. petrosum, the only other species with a described fossil male.

== Description ==
P. eocenicum males range between 2.2–2.7 mm (0.087–0.106 in) in adult length, with a shiny exoskeleton. The surface of the exoskeleton has hairs, both upright and laying flat, and pitting across the whole body. The hairs are short, being shorter than the distance between each hair, while the upright hair is confined to areas of the legs, and around the tip of the gaster. The pits are not well developed on the head or the scutum, but become much more developed on the upper surface of the mesopleura and propodeum, spaced slightly closer than the diameter of each pit. Fore-wings on the males range between 1.7–2.1 mm (0.067–0.083 in) in length and have a distinct fringe of hair along the back edge of the wing.
