= Probolomyrmex brevirostris =

Scientific classification
- Kingdom: Animalia
- Phylum: Arthropoda
- Class: Insecta
- Order: Hymenoptera
- Family: Formicidae
- Genus: Probolomyrmex
- Species: P. brevirostris

Binomial name
- Probolomyrmex brevirostris (Forel, 1910)

Synonyms
- Escherichia brevirostris Forel, 1910; Probolomyrmex parvus Weber, 1949

Species of ant

Probolomyrmex brevirostris is a species of ant in the subfamily Proceratiinae. It is found from Yemen to Uganda.
