= Proceratium petrosum =

Proceratium petrosum Temporal range: Priabonian

Scientific classification
- Domain: Eukaryota
- Kingdom: Animalia
- Phylum: Arthropoda
- Class: Insecta
- Order: Hymenoptera
- Family: Formicidae
- Genus: Proceratium
- Species: †P. petrosum

Binomial name
- †Proceratium petrosum Dlussky, Rasnitsyn & Perfilieva, 2015

Extinct species of ant

Proceratium petrosum is an extinct species of formicid in the ant subfamily Proceratiinae known from a fossil found in eastern Asia.

== History and classification ==
P. petrosum is known from a single ant found in Russia. The specimen was described from a compression fossil preserved in diatomite deposits of the Bol’shaya Svetlovodnaya site. The site is exposed on the bank of Barachek Creek 3 km (1.9 mi) upstream from the creeks confluence with the Bol’shaya Svetlovodnaya River in the Pozharsky District, on the Pacific Coast of Russia. The fossil-bearing rocks preserve possibly Priabonian plants and animals which lived in and around a small lake near a volcano. The site has been attributed to either the Maksimovka or Salibez Formations and compared to the Bembridge Marls and Florissant Formation, both of which are Priabonian in age.

At the time of description, the holotype male specimen, number PIN 3429/103 was preserved in the A. A. Borissiak Paleontological Institute collections, part of the Russian Academy of Sciences. The fossil was first described by the trio of paleomyrmecologists Gennady Dlussky, Alexandr Rasnitsyn and Ksenia Perfilieva. In the type description, Dlussky, Rasnitsyn and Perfilieva named the species P. petrosum, with the specific epithet derived the Latinized Greek petros meaning "stone".

As of the 2015 description of P. petrosum six species of Proceratium had been described from fossils. P. denticulatum, P. dominicanum, P. gibberum and P. poinari are younger than P. petrosum, being described from the Middle Miocene Dominican amber. P. eocenicum from Baltic amber is of similar age to P. petrosum, and the only other species with a described fossil male. Of the six fossil species, P. petrosum was the first to be described from a compression fossil.

== Description ==
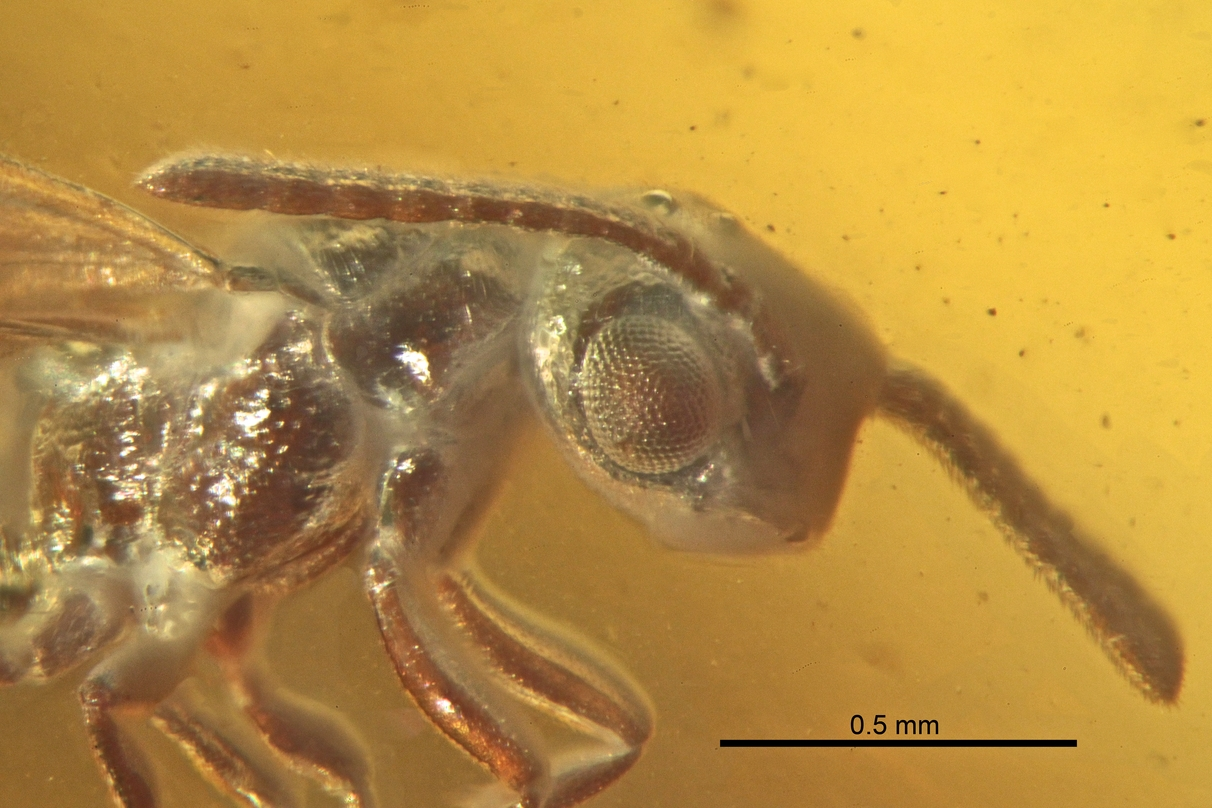
Proceratium eocenicum paratype male

The P. petrosum male is preserved as a dorsal compression showing the upper surface of the head, thorax and abdomen, with fore-wings outspread to the side. The body length is estimated to have been 7.5 mm (0.30 in), notably longer than the Baltic amber species P. eocenicum, which ranged between 2.2–2.7 mm (0.087–0.106 in). P. petrosum has a head with a smoothly curved rear edge and no corners at the rear. The compound eyes and the ocelli are all large and distinct.
