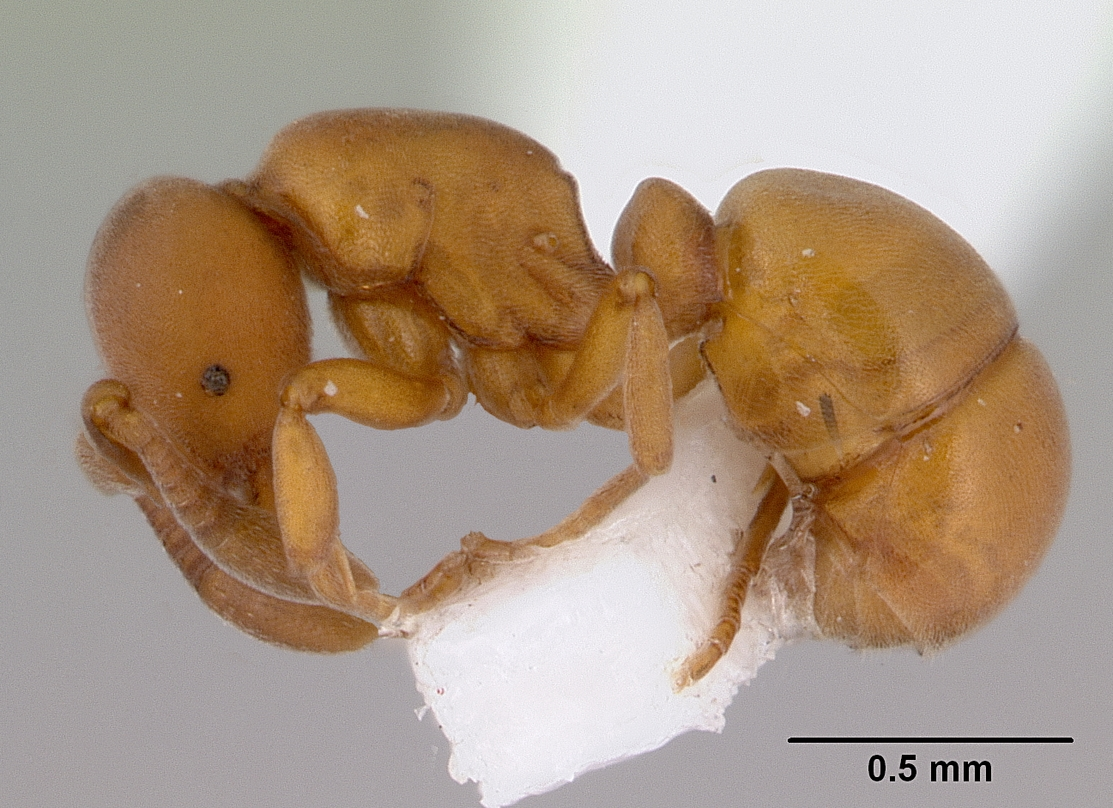
- Discothyrea antarctica worker

Scientific classification
- Domain: Eukaryota
- Kingdom: Animalia
- Phylum: Arthropoda
- Class: Insecta
- Order: Hymenoptera
- Family: Formicidae
- Genus: Discothyrea
- Species: D. antarctica

Binomial name
- Discothyrea antarctica Emery, 1895

= Discothyrea antarctica =

Species of ant

Discothyrea antarctica is a species of ant in the genus Discothyrea, within the subfamily Proceratiinae, and is endemic to New Zealand. It is found in native forests throughout the country.
