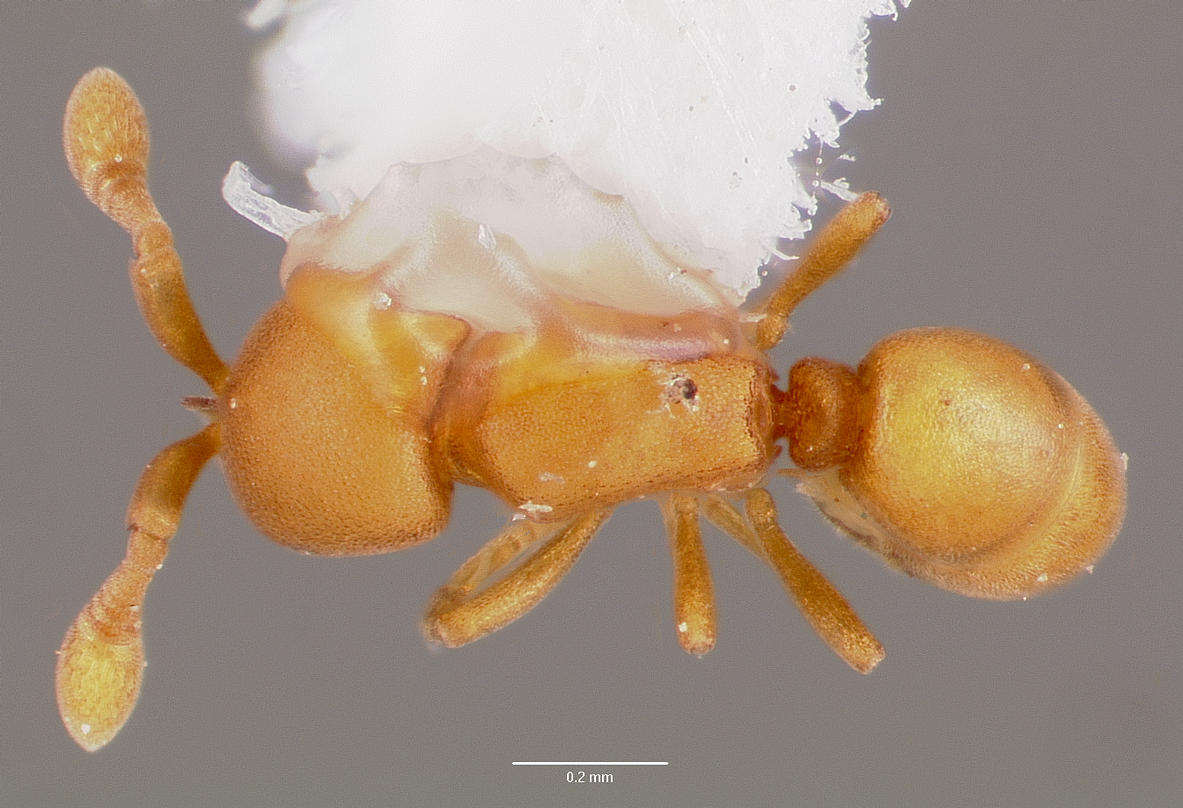

Scientific classification
- Kingdom: Animalia
- Phylum: Arthropoda
- Class: Insecta
- Order: Hymenoptera
- Family: Formicidae
- Genus: Discothyrea
- Species: D. testacea

Binomial name
- Discothyrea testacea Roger, 1863

= Discothyrea testacea =

Species of ant

Discothyrea testacea is a species of ant in the family Formicidae and subfamily Proceratiinae. It is native to the Southeastern United States, as well as some islands in the Caribbean and the Yucatán Peninsula.

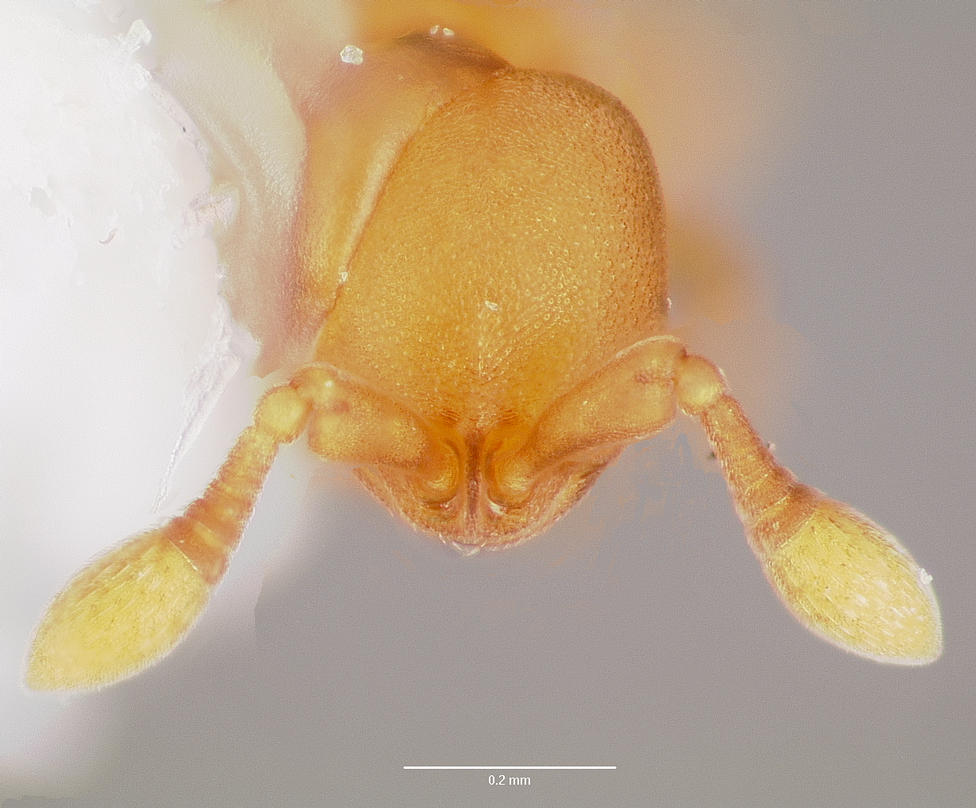

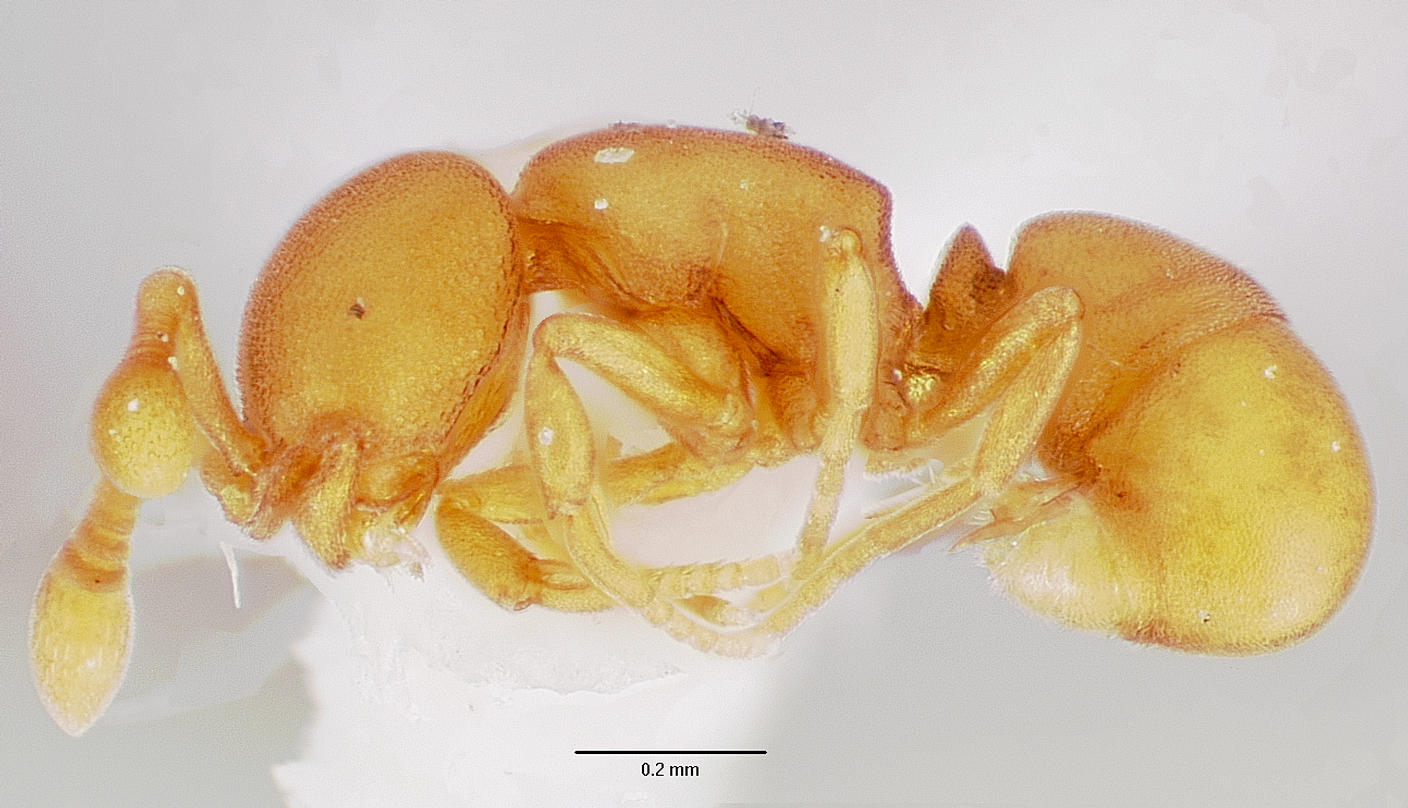
