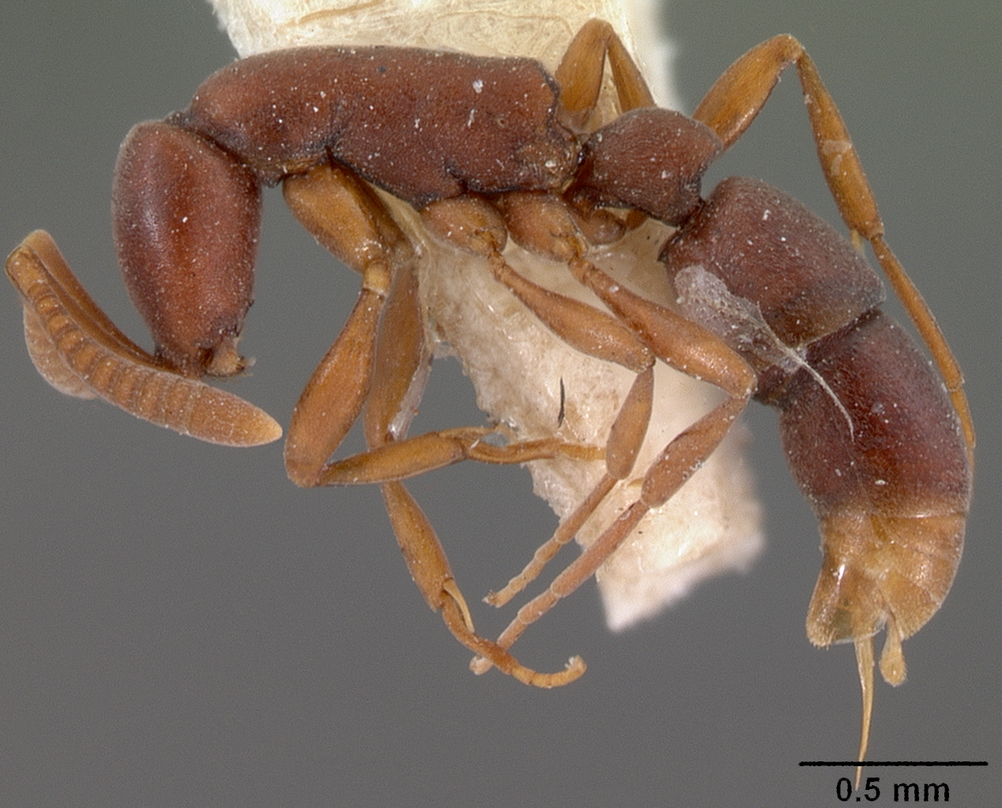

Scientific classification
- Kingdom: Animalia
- Phylum: Arthropoda
- Class: Insecta
- Order: Hymenoptera
- Family: Formicidae
- Genus: Probolomyrmex
- Species: P. filiformis

Binomial name
- Probolomyrmex filiformis Mayr, 1901

= Probolomyrmex filiformis =

Species of ant

Probolomyrmex filiformis is a species of ant in the subfamily Proceratiinae. It is native to South Africa.
