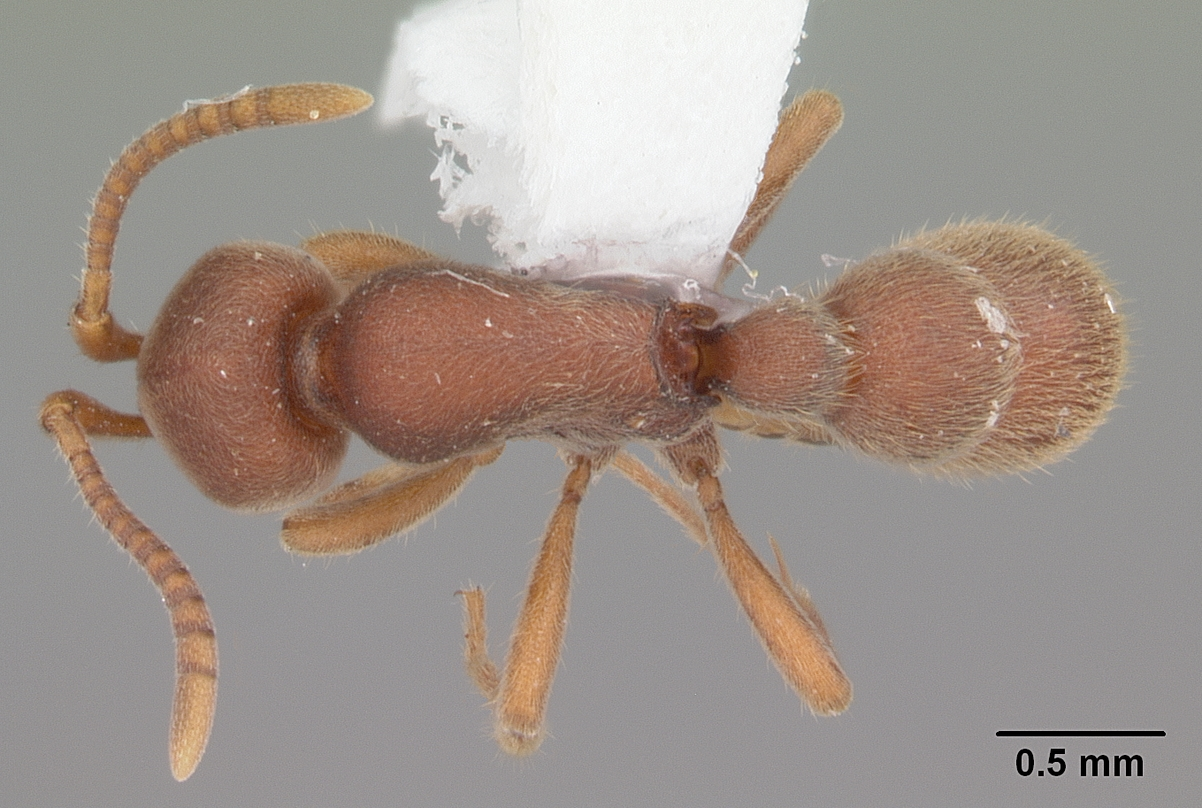

Scientific classification
- Kingdom: Animalia
- Phylum: Arthropoda
- Clade: Pancrustacea
- Class: Insecta
- Order: Hymenoptera
- Family: Formicidae
- Genus: Proceratium
- Species: P. pergandei

Binomial name
- Proceratium pergandei (Emery, 1895)

Synonyms
- Sysphincta pergandei Emery, 1895

= Proceratium pergandei =

Species of ant

Proceratium pergandei is a species of ant in the family Formicidae. It is endemic to the Central and Eastern United States.
