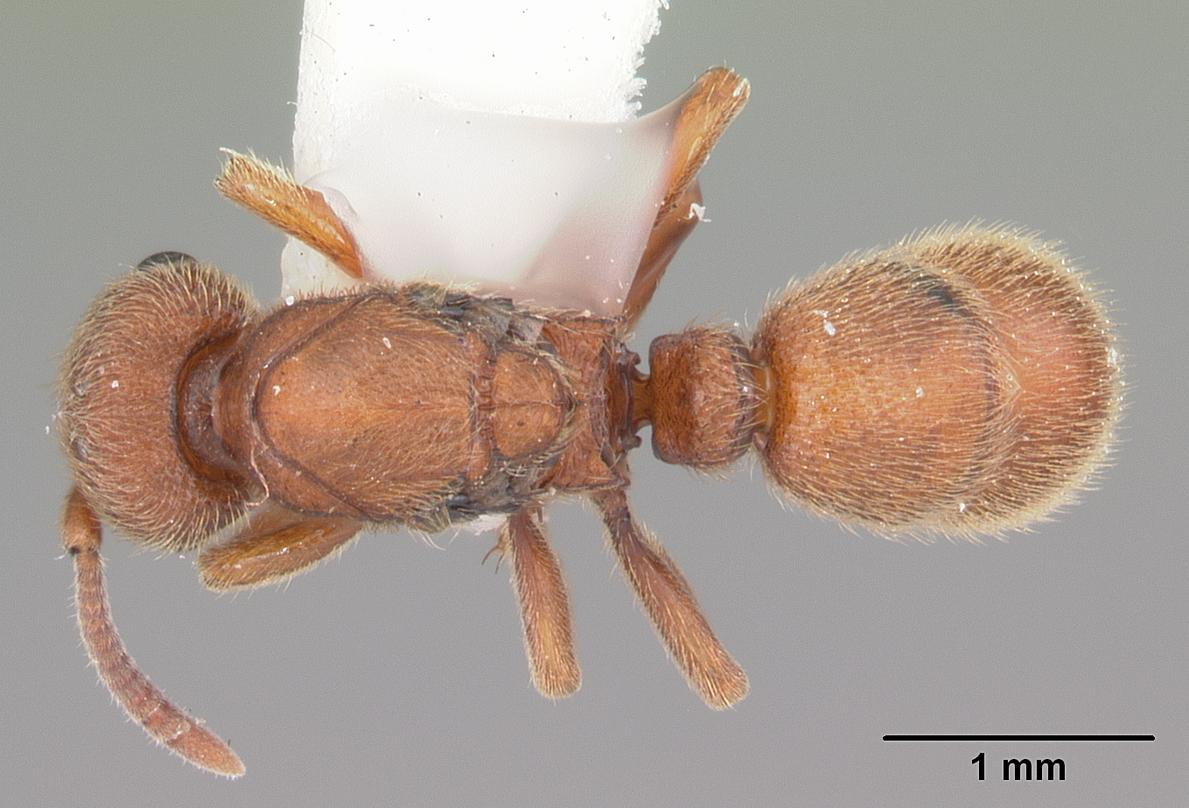

Scientific classification
- Kingdom: Animalia
- Phylum: Arthropoda
- Class: Insecta
- Order: Hymenoptera
- Family: Formicidae
- Genus: Proceratium
- Species: P. croceum

Binomial name
- Proceratium croceum (Roger, 1860)

= Proceratium croceum =

Species of ant

Proceratium croceum is a species of ant in the family Formicidae.

== Distribution ==
Geographic regions: United States

Biogeographic regions : Nearctic

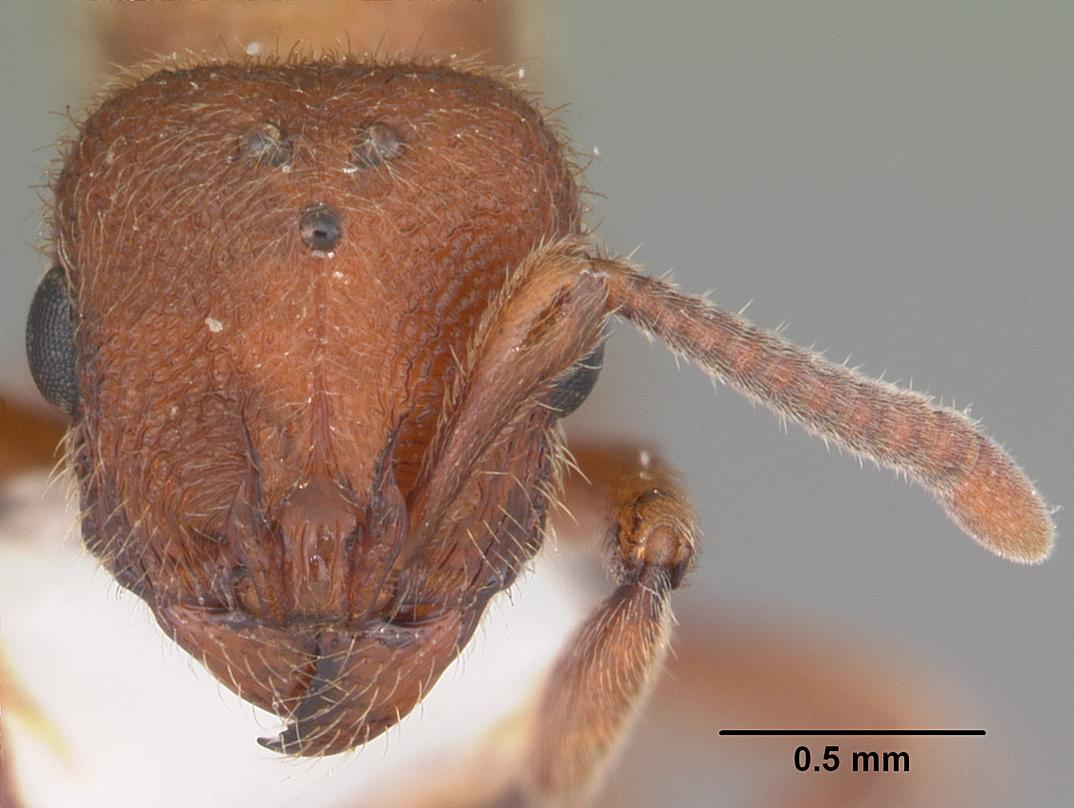

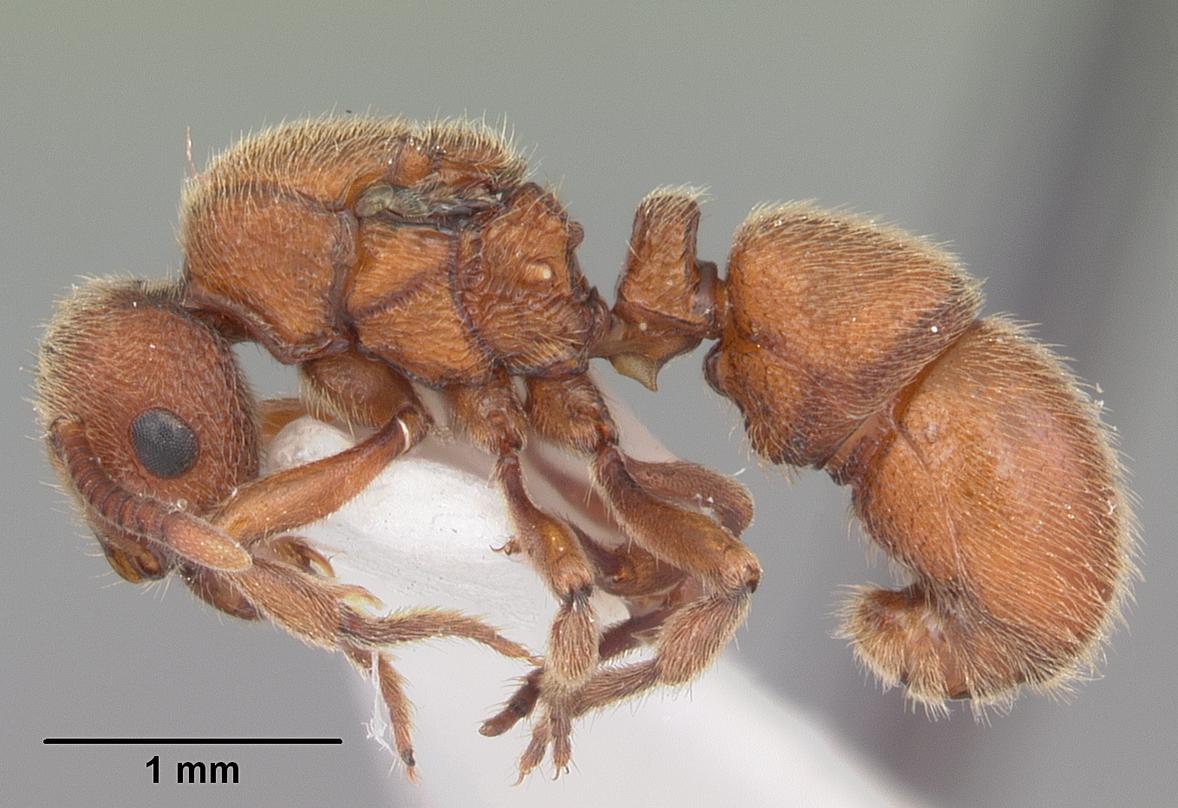
