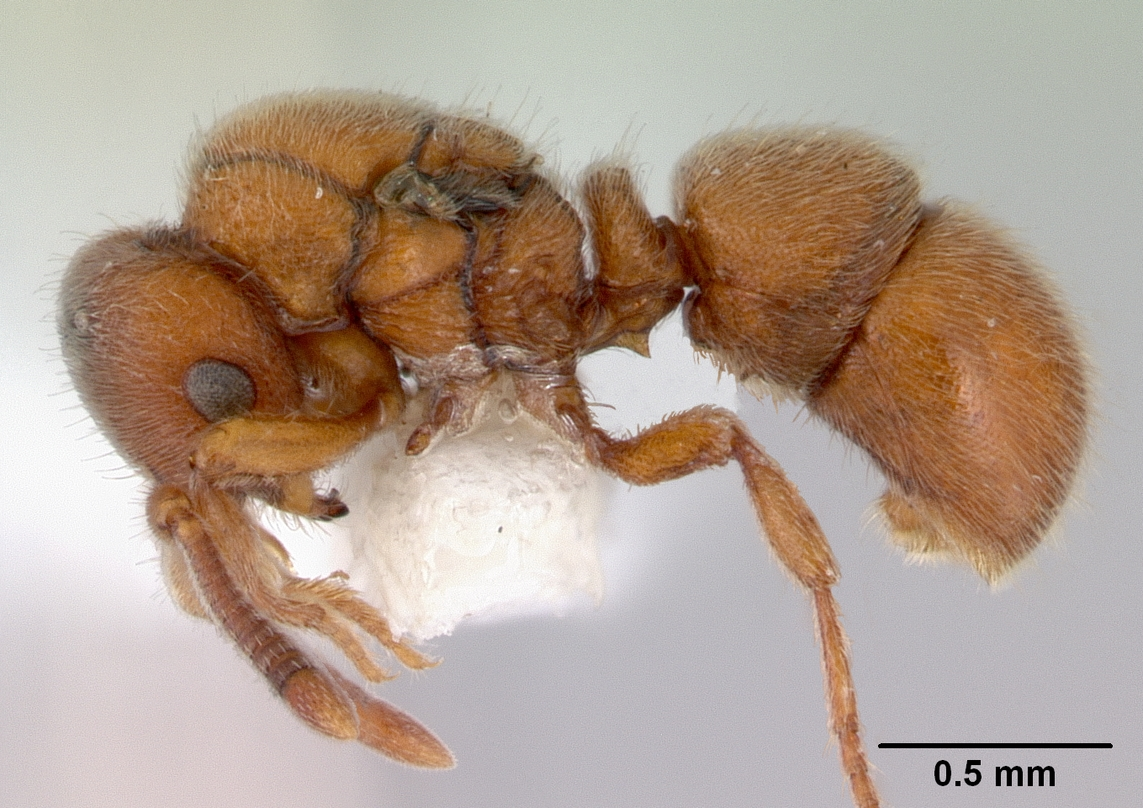

Scientific classification
- Kingdom: Animalia
- Phylum: Arthropoda
- Class: Insecta
- Order: Hymenoptera
- Family: Formicidae
- Genus: Proceratium
- Species: P. australe

Binomial name
- Proceratium australe de Andrade, 2003

= Proceratium australe =

Species of ant

Proceratium australe is a species of ant in the family Formicidae. It is native to Australia.
