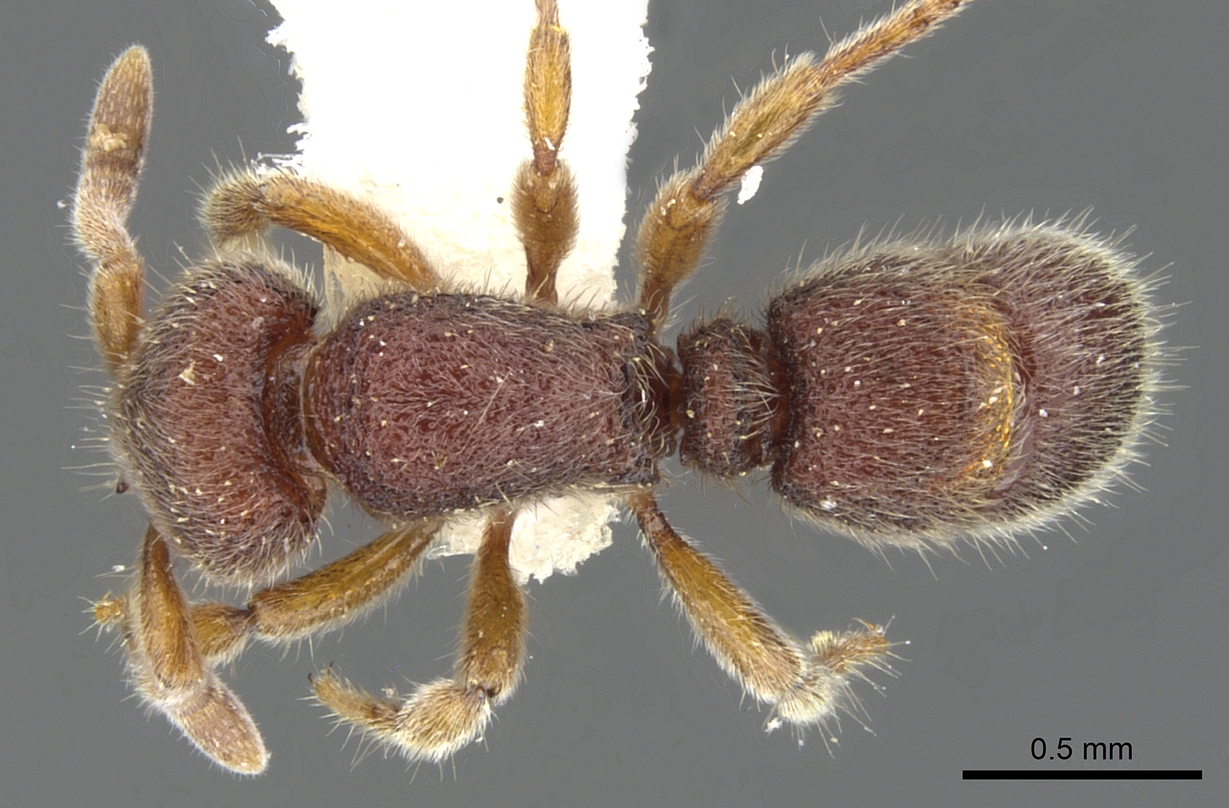

Scientific classification
- Kingdom: Animalia
- Phylum: Arthropoda
- Class: Insecta
- Order: Hymenoptera
- Family: Formicidae
- Genus: Proceratium
- Species: P. angulinode

Binomial name
- Proceratium angulinode de Andrade, 2003

= Proceratium angulinode =

Species of ant

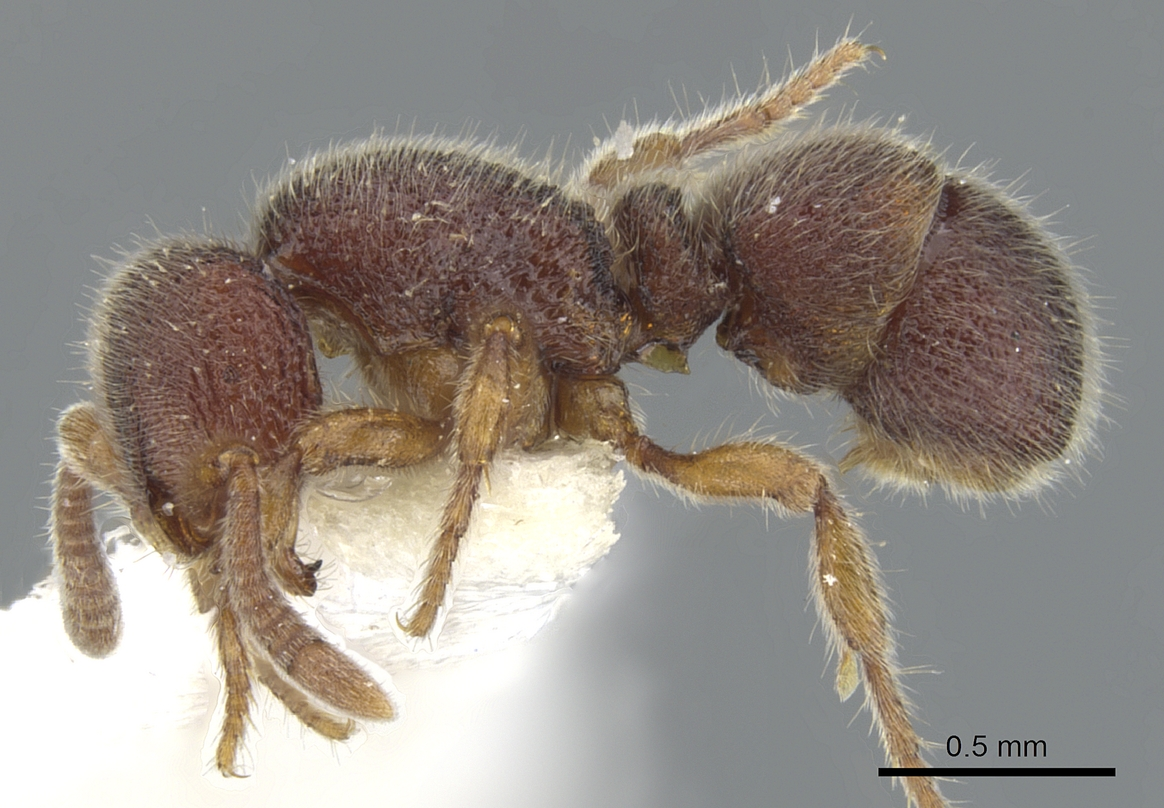

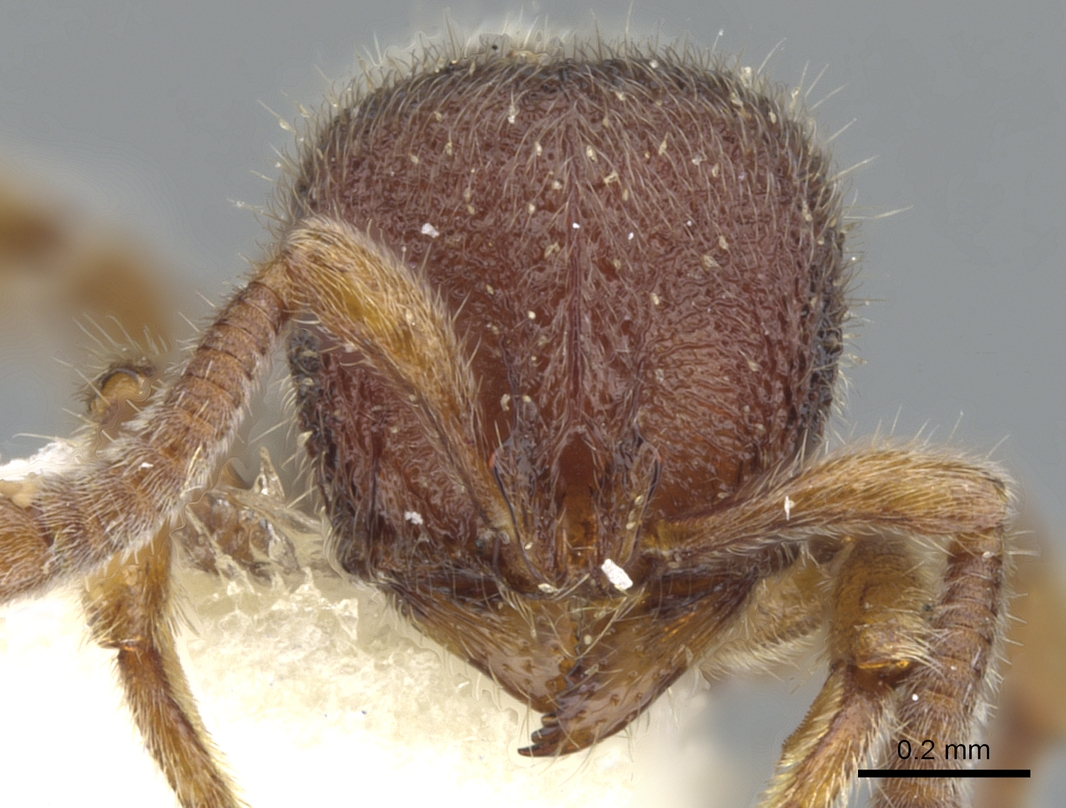

Proceratium angulinode is a species of ant in the family Formicidae. It is found in Borneo, Indonesia, and Malaysia.
