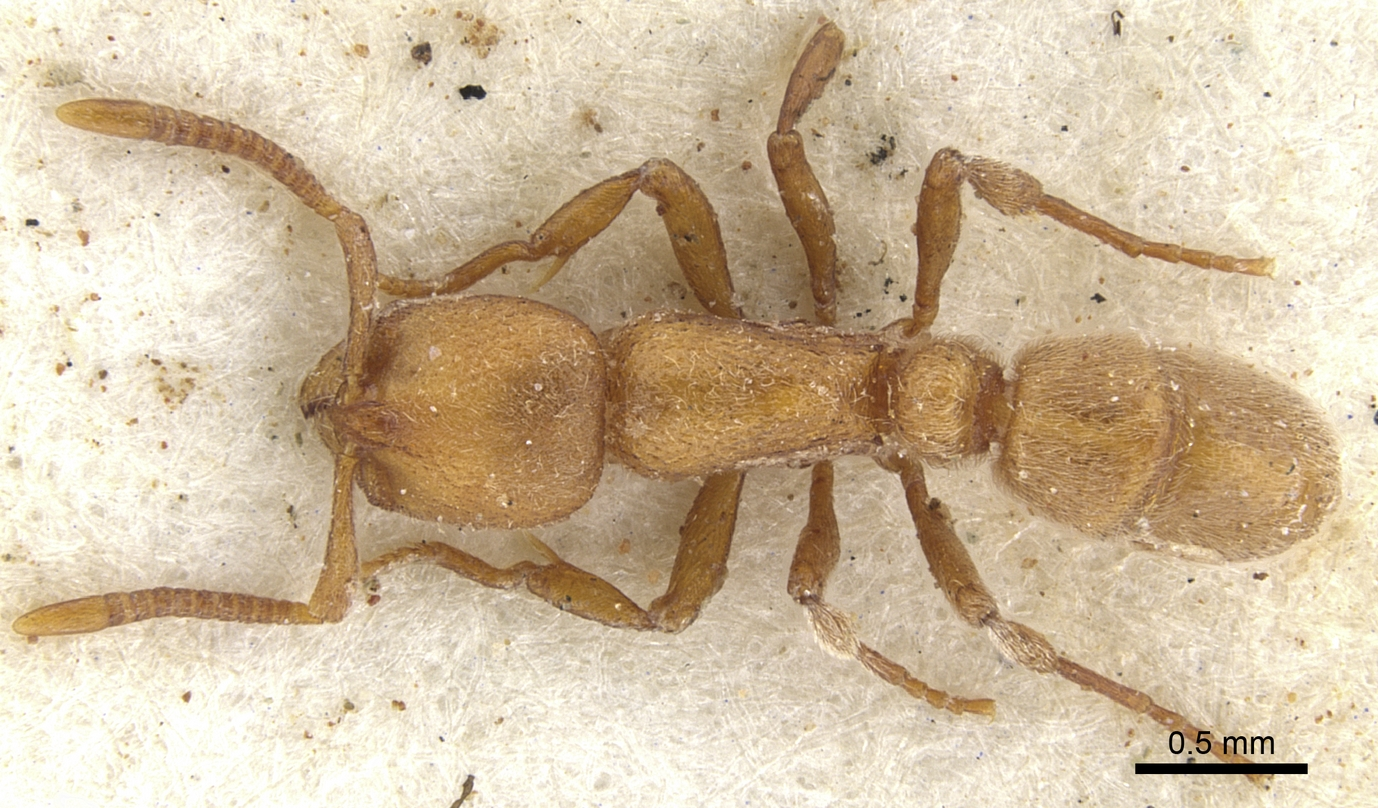

Scientific classification
- Kingdom: Animalia
- Phylum: Arthropoda
- Class: Insecta
- Order: Hymenoptera
- Family: Formicidae
- Genus: Proceratium
- Species: P. arnoldi

Binomial name
- Proceratium arnoldi Forel, 1913

= Proceratium arnoldi =

Species of ant

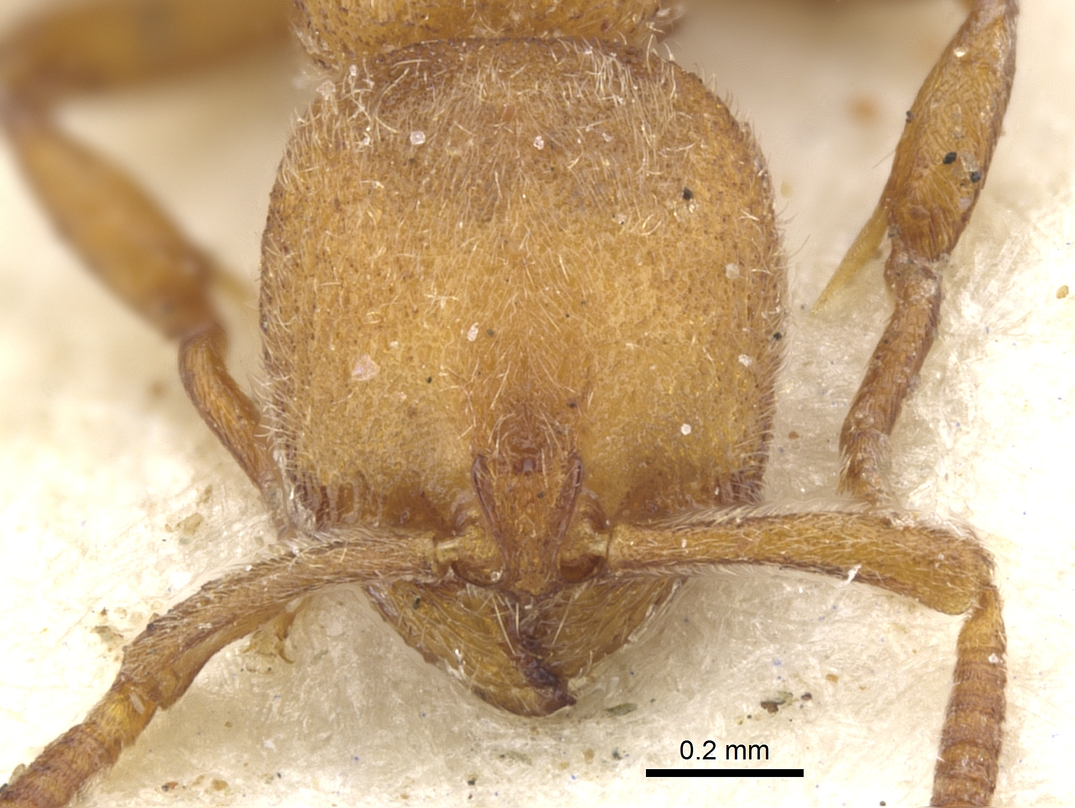

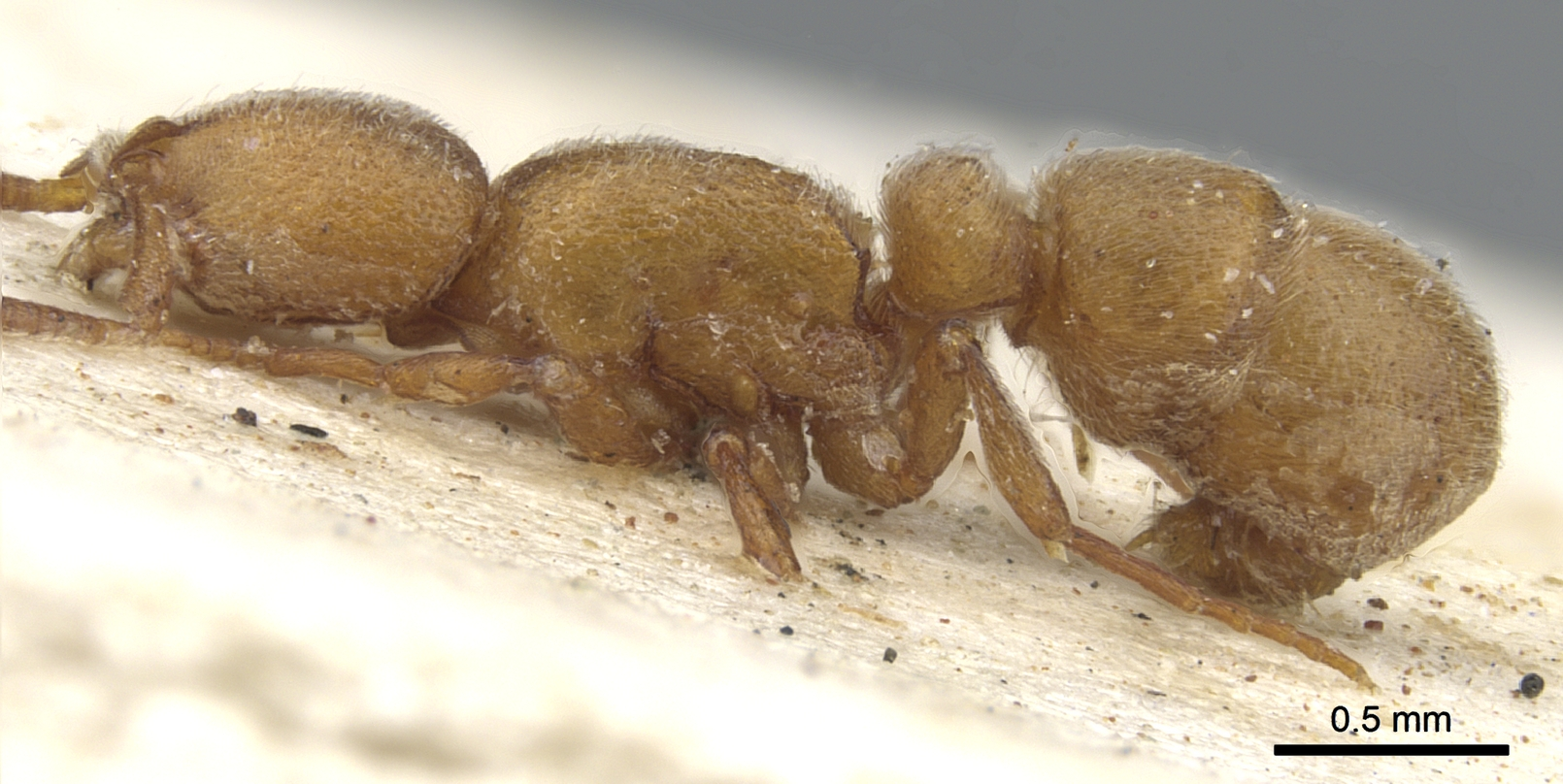

Proceratium arnoldi is a species of ant in the family Formicidae. It is distributed around South Africa and Zimbabwe, and is typically found in the Afrotropical realm.
