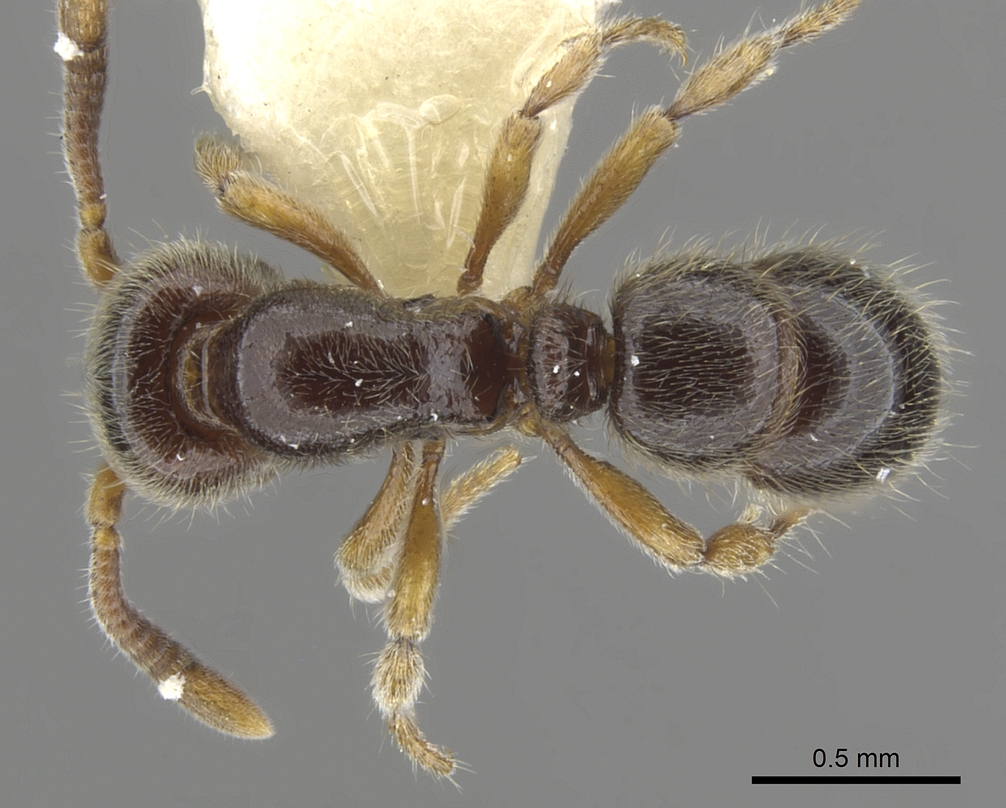

Scientific classification
- Kingdom: Animalia
- Phylum: Arthropoda
- Class: Insecta
- Order: Hymenoptera
- Family: Formicidae
- Genus: Proceratium
- Species: P. austronesicum

Binomial name
- Proceratium austronesicum (Baroni Urbani & De Andrade, 2003)

= Proceratium austronesicum =

Species of ant

Proceratium austronesicum is a species of ant in the family Formicidae. It is distributed around Papua New Guinea and Solomon Islands, and is typically found in the Australasia

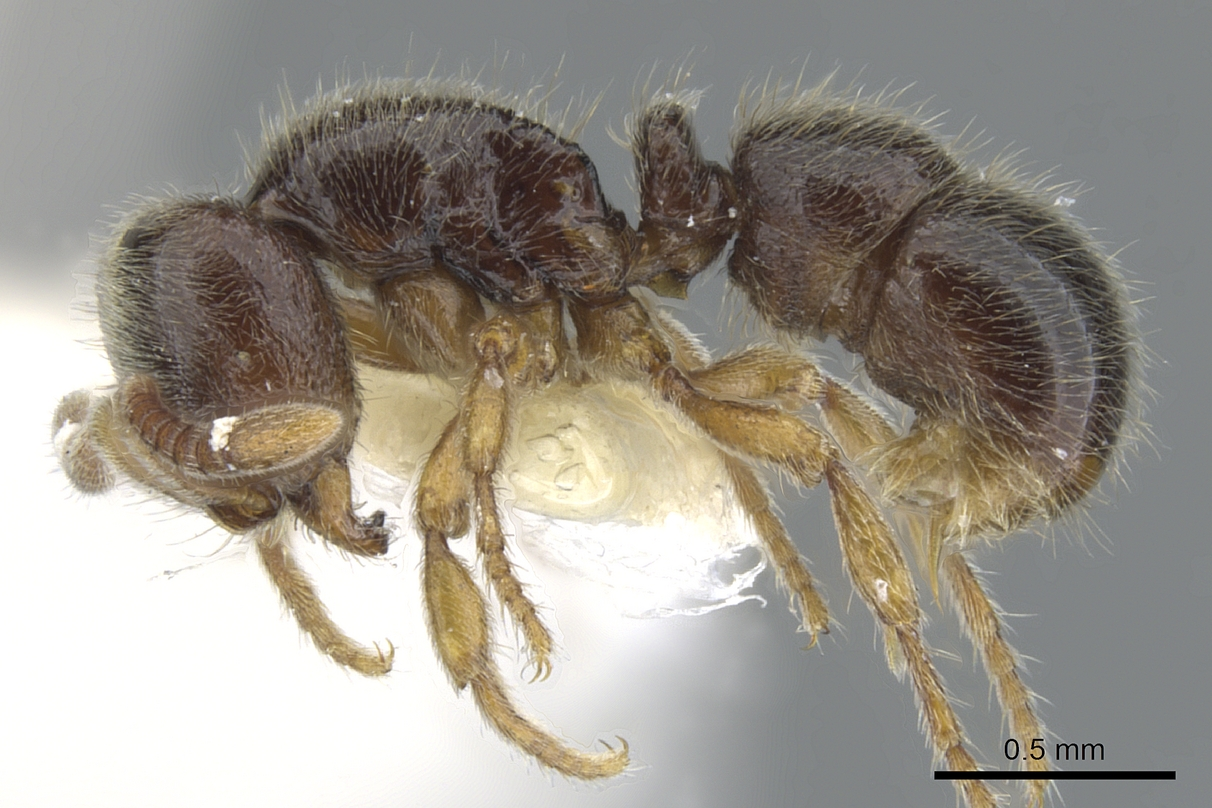

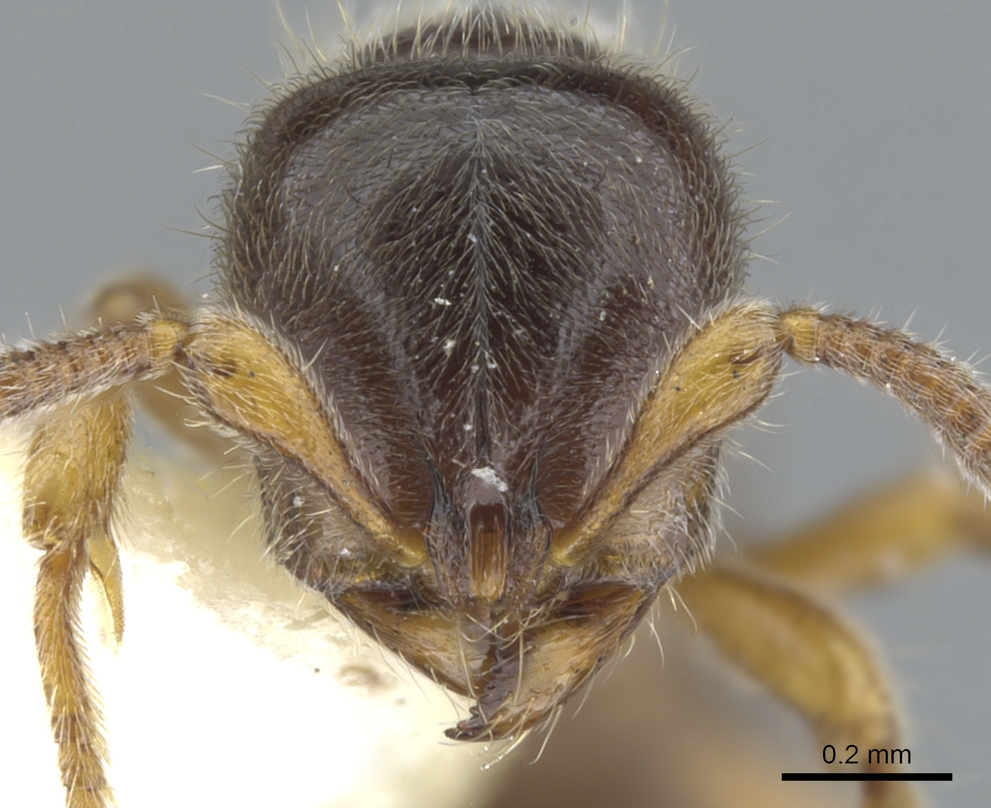
