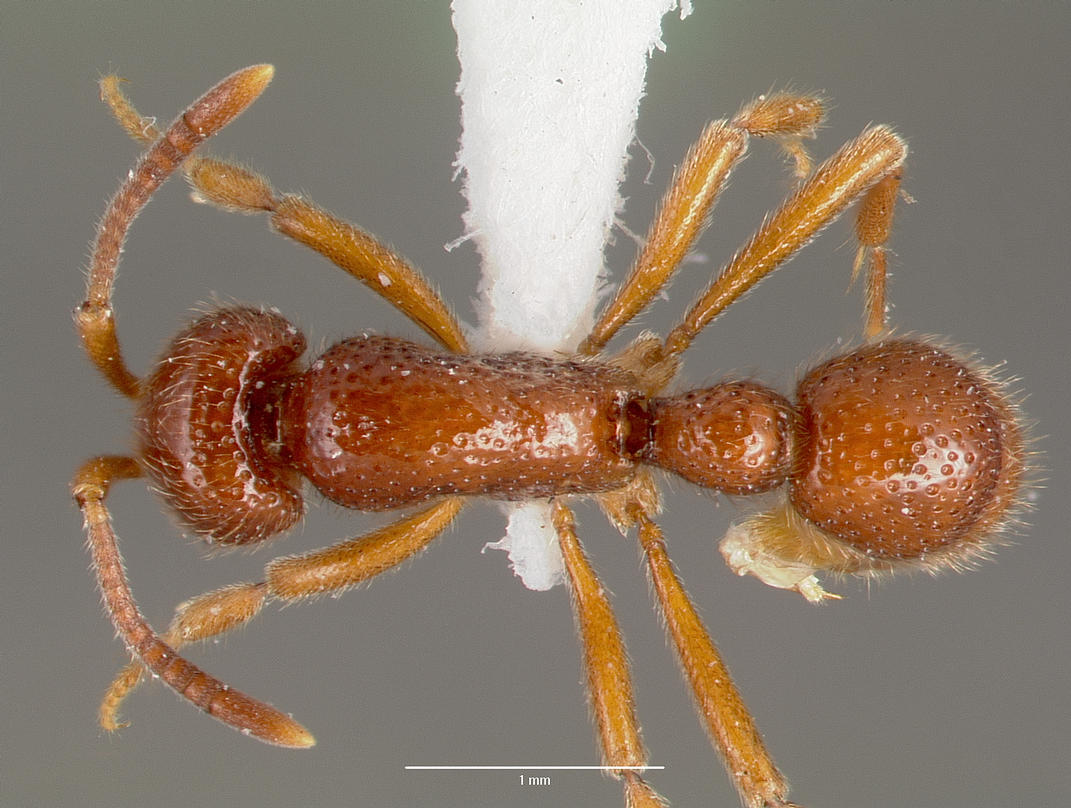

Scientific classification
- Kingdom: Animalia
- Phylum: Arthropoda
- Class: Insecta
- Order: Hymenoptera
- Family: Formicidae
- Genus: Proceratium
- Species: P. avium

Binomial name
- Proceratium avium Brown, 1974

= Proceratium avium =

Species of ant

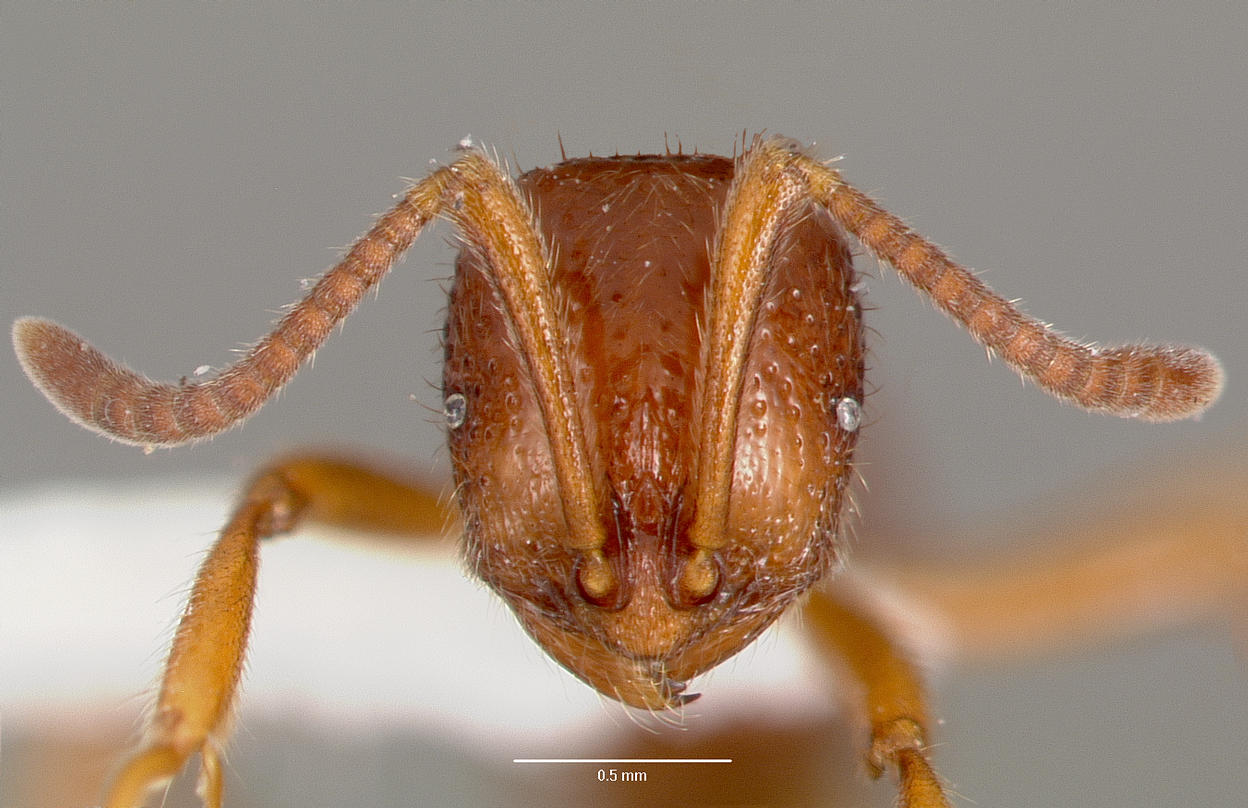

Proceratium avium is a species of ant in the family Formicidae. It is found on the island of Réunion.
