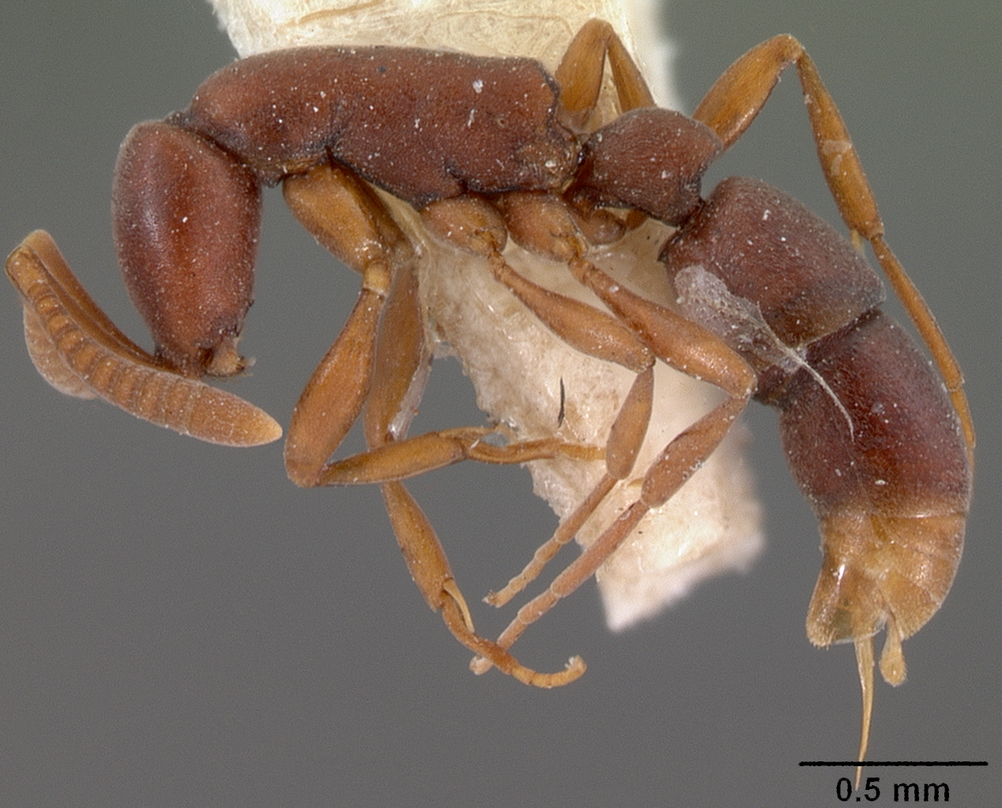
- Probolomyrmex filiformis worker

Scientific classification
- Domain: Eukaryota
- Kingdom: Animalia
- Phylum: Arthropoda
- Class: Insecta
- Order: Hymenoptera
- Family: Formicidae
- Subfamily: Proceratiinae
- Tribe: Probolomyrmecini; Perrault, 2000
- Genus: Probolomyrmex; Mayr, 1901

Type species
- Probolomyrmex filiformis Mayr, 1901

Diversity
- 26 species

Synonyms
- Escherichia Forel, 1910

= Probolomyrmex =

Genus of ants

Probolomyrmex is a genus of ants in the subfamily Proceratiinae. The genus is distributed throughout the tropics and subtropics. The ants are very rare, and are rarely collected in the field, but they appear to be nesting in the leaf litter or in rotten wood. Little is known about their biology.

== Species ==
- Probolomyrmex aliundus Shattuck, Gunawardene & Heterick, 2012
- Probolomyrmex bidens Brown, 1975
- Probolomyrmex boliviensis Mann, 1923
- Probolomyrmex brevirostris (Forel, 1910)
- Probolomyrmex brujitae Agosti, 1995
- Probolomyrmex curculiformis Hita Garcia & Fisher, 2014
- Probolomyrmex dammermani Wheeler, 1928
- Probolomyrmex filiformis Mayr, 1901
- Probolomyrmex greavesi Taylor, 1965
- Probolomyrmex guanacastensis O'Keefe & Agosti, 1998
- Probolomyrmex guineensis Taylor, 1965
- Probolomyrmex itoi Eguchi, Yoshimura & Yamane, 2006
- Probolomyrmex latalongus Shattuck, Gunawardene & Heterick, 2012
- Probolomyrmex longinodus Terayama & Ogata, 1988
- Probolomyrmex longiscapus Xu & Zeng, 2000
- Probolomyrmex maryatiae Eguchi, Yoshimura & Yamane, 2006
- Probolomyrmex newguinensis Shattuck, Gunawardene & Heterick, 2012
- Probolomyrmex okinawensis Terayama & Ogata, 1988
- Probolomyrmex petiolatus Weber, 1940
- Probolomyrmex procne Brown, 1975
- Probolomyrmex salomonis Taylor, 1965
- Probolomyrmex simplex Shattuck, Gunawardene & Heterick, 2012
- Probolomyrmex tani Fisher, 2007
- Probolomyrmex vieti Eguchi, Yoshimura & Yamane, 2006
- Probolomyrmex watanabei Tanaka, 1974
- Probolomyrmex zahamena Hita Garcia & Fisher, 2014
