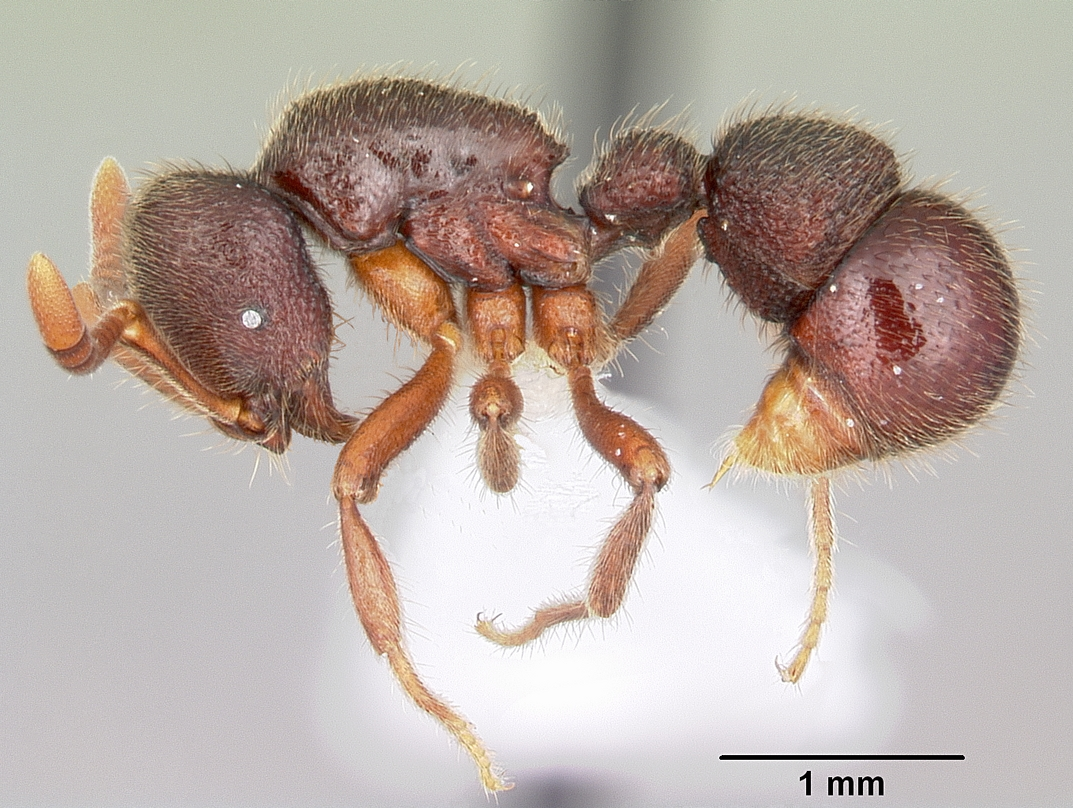
- Proceratium google worker, holotype specimen

Scientific classification
- Kingdom: Animalia
- Phylum: Arthropoda
- Clade: Pancrustacea
- Class: Insecta
- Order: Hymenoptera
- Family: Formicidae
- Genus: Proceratium
- Species: P. google

Binomial name
- Proceratium google Fisher, 2005

= Proceratium google =

Species of ant

Proceratium google, also known as the Google ant, was discovered in Madagascar by Brian L. Fisher, Associate Curator of Entomology at the California Academy of Sciences. The ant has an oddly shaped abdomen, adapted for hunting its exclusive meal of spider eggs.

Fisher named the ant after the search engine company Google Inc., as a tribute to the usefulness of Google Earth in his research. He wrote:

Named in recognition of the support from the Google company. I hope that Google will continue applying its talent to serve data relevant to the biodiversity community, conservation planners, and the general public. By creating a “Zoogle,” Google could help achieve free and democratic access to taxonomic and biodiversity data on species. P. google is also suspected to be a specialist egg predator of spiders, which is also why this ant is aptly named after Google— for the ability to hunt down obscure prey. The specific name is an arbitrary combination, to be treated as a noun in apposition.
