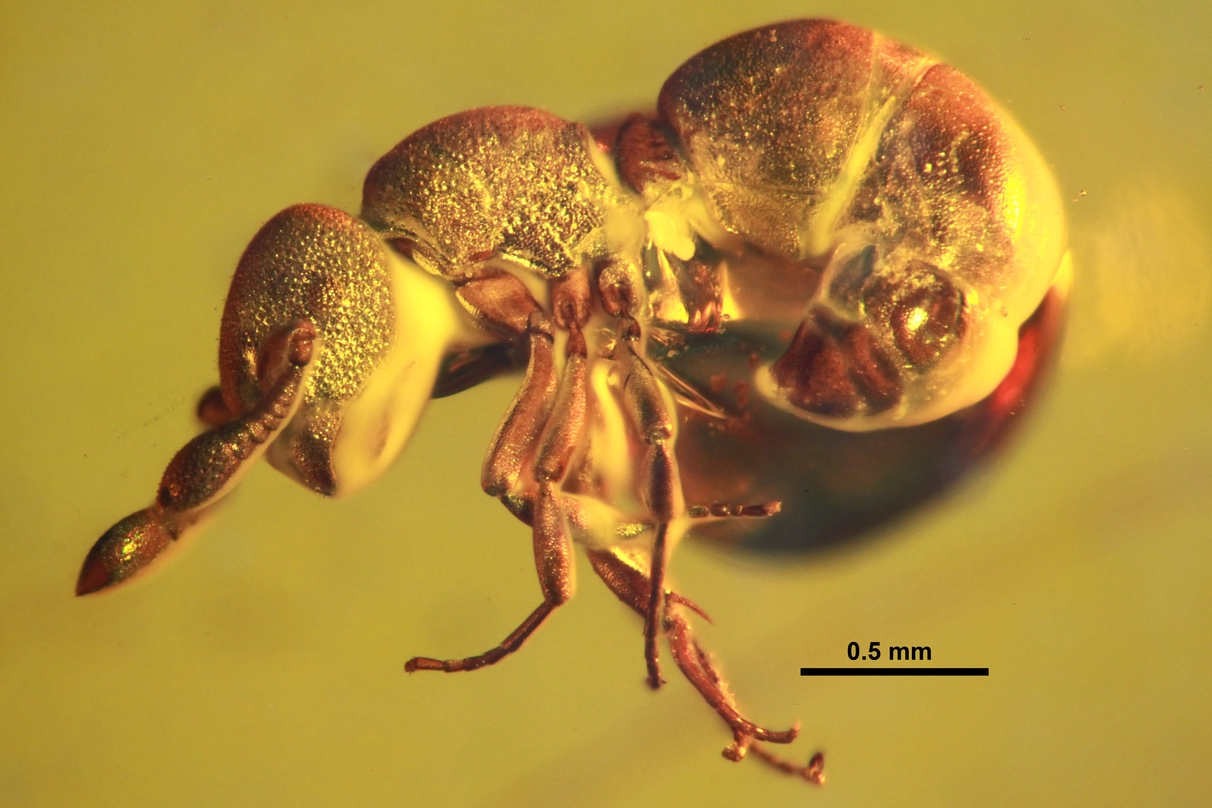
- Bradoponera meieri worker

Scientific classification
- Kingdom: Animalia
- Phylum: Arthropoda
- Clade: Pancrustacea
- Class: Insecta
- Order: Hymenoptera
- Family: Formicidae
- Subfamily: Proceratiinae
- Tribe: Proceratiini
- Genus: †Bradoponera; Mayr, 1868

Type species
- Bradoponera meieri

Species
- B. electrina; B. meieri; B. similis; B. wunderlichi

= Bradoponera =

Bradoponera Temporal range: Middle Eocene – Early Miocene

Extinct genus of ants

Bradoponera is an extinct genus of ant in the Formicidae subfamily Proceratiinae, and is one of four genera of the subfamily. The genus contains four described species Bradoponera electrina, Bradoponera meieri, Bradoponera similis, and Bradoponera wunderlichi. The species are known from several Middle Eocene amber fossils which were found in Europe.

== History and classification ==
Individuals of Bradoponera species have been found as inclusions in two different Middle Eocene to Early Oligocene amber deposits in Europe. The species B. electrina and B. wunderlichi are known from Baltic amber, while B. similis is known from Bitterfield amber only. The type species B. meieri is the most wide spread of the four species, with individuals identified from Baltic, Bitterfeld and Rovno ambers.

Baltic amber is approximately 46 million years old, having been deposited during the Lutetian stage of the Middle Eocene. There is debate on what plant family the amber was produced by, with evidence supporting them being relatives of either Agathis or Pseudolarix.

Rovno amber, recovered from deposits in the Rivne region of Ukraine and areas of western Poland, is slightly younger in age, being dated between the Bartonian of the Late Eocene to possibly Early Oligocene.

Bitterfeld amber is recovered from coal deposits in the Saxony area of Germany and the dating of the deposits is uncertain. Bitterfeld represents a section of the Eocene Paratethys Sea, and the amber that is recovered from the region is thought to be redeposited from older sediments. The fossil record of Bitterfeld and Baltic amber insects is very similar with a number of shared species, and that similarity is noted in the suggestions of a single source for the paleoforest that produced the amber.

The genus was first described in 1868 by the Austrian entomologist Gustav Mayr with Mayr's 1868 type descriptions of the new genus and species being published in the journal Beiträge zur Naturkunde Preussens. B. meieri was described from several workers and the type series of fossils were placed into the amber collections of the University of Königsberg. Much of the Königsberg collection was lost during World War II with only a small portion of the collection, about 10%, rediscovered in the University of Göttingen collections.

Both B. electrina and B. wunderlichi are described from single fossils. The two type specimens and three B. meieri workers were examined and described by paleomyrmecologists Maria L. De Andrade and Cesare Baroni Urbani. The five specimens were originally in the private collection of Jörg Wunderlich who subsequently allowed the fossils to be purchased by the Museo Regionale di Scienze Naturali of Turin. Baroni Urbani described both species in a 2003 Revue Suisse de Zoologie paper. At some point after 2003 both the B. electrina and B. wunderlichi type specimens were transferred to the Senckenberg Museum in Germany.

In 2009 a fourth species, B. similius from Bitterfeld amber, was described and placed into the genus. The single described worker, specimen HM 11/388, was housed in the Natural History Museum of Berlin while being studied. The species was erected by Russian paleoentomologist Gennady Dlussky in a paper on Late Eocene amber ant species, but no etymology for the species was provided in the paper.

== Paleoecology ==
The suggested habitat of Bradoponera differs from the other members of Proceratiinae. Species of the three living genera nest and live in the soft upper forest floor litter. As such the workers are not found on tree trunks or in the canopies. Bradoponera fossils are predominantly workers, which indicate the species was not likely to be nesting on the ground but arboreally. Given the rounded heads and lack of strong chewing mandibles, Dlussky hypothesized the colony nests to have been in preexisting cavities of the tree, or more likely, in debris and soils accumulating around epiphytes.

== Description ==
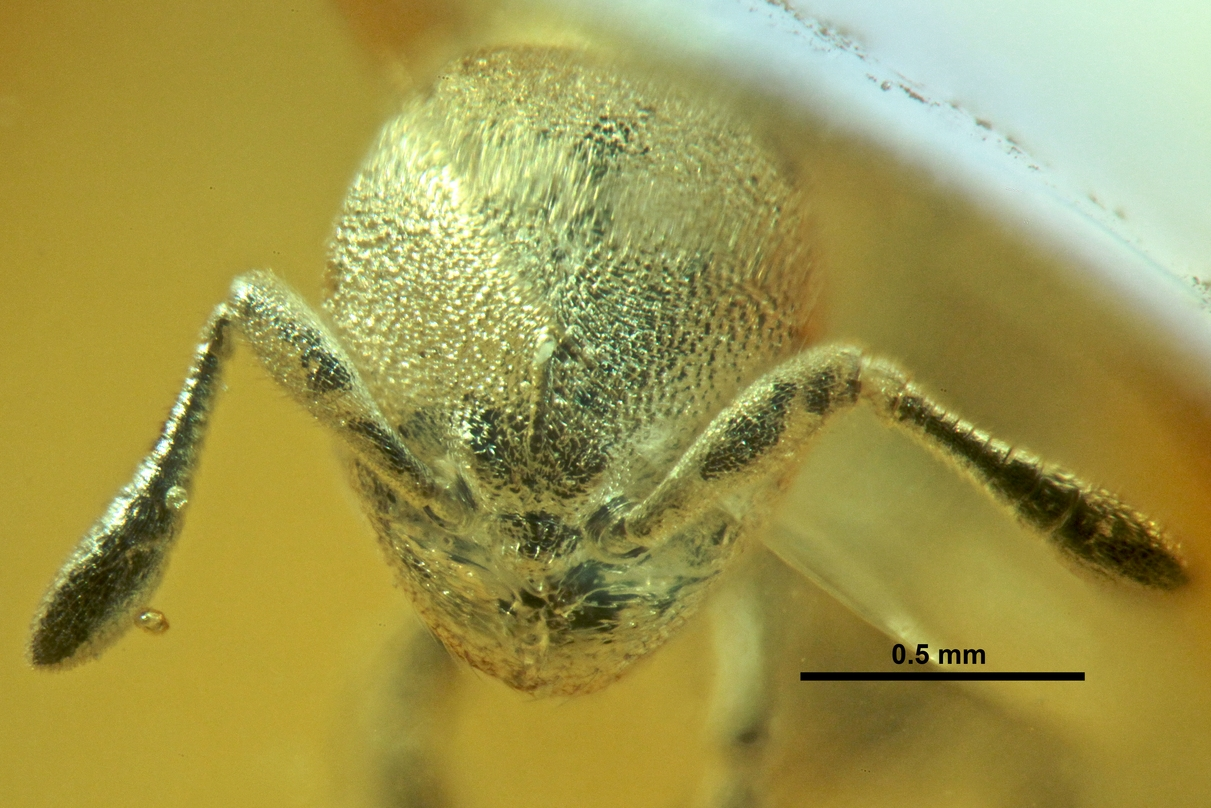
B. electrina worker head

Bradoponera species are distinguished from other Proceratiinae genera by a combination of features. In queens and workers, the small eyes are composed of a small amount of ommatidia and have a low to flat profile on the head. There are ocelli present on queens and males, but ocelli are absent in workers. The antennae have either nine segments as in B. wunderlichi or twelve as in the other three species. In all species the expand in diameter from the base to the tip, and the final flagellomere is inflated to form a large club. Frontal ridges form along the edges of the antennae sockets, curving down and apart from each other. The clypeus is curved outward along the front edge and separated from the antennae at the back edge by the frontal ridges. All species have triangular mandibles that lack developed teeth on the chewing sides. The labial palps have four segments, while the maxillary palps have five, with the second segments from the maxilla curved rather than hammer shaped.

The bodies of the workers and queens have a compact and very robust mesosoma that is moderately convex along the top surface. With the workers there are no suture lines distinguishing the mesopropodeal or promesonotal sutures. The petioles have a node that is scale or wedge shaped when viewed from the side. A small exoskeletal plate, the helcium, is present, projecting forward from the middle of the first gastral segments front side. The tergite on the second gaster segment is very highly domed, which causes the remaining gasteral segments to curl down and forward.

Only males of B meieri have been described. Generally they have smaller round heads with ocelli, large well developed eyes and a rounded rear margin to the head lacking occipital corners. The short frontal ridges do not cover the antennae bases. The antennae are long and string shaped, with thirteen segments that each have a bead-like outline. Males have the same shape and structure in their mandibles as queens and workers, but in males the closed mandibles do not touch each other. The terminal segment of the abdomen does not have a spine present. The forewings of males have venation that is incomplete, missing the mcu and rm cells while the hindwings do not have jugal lobes.

=== B. electrina ===
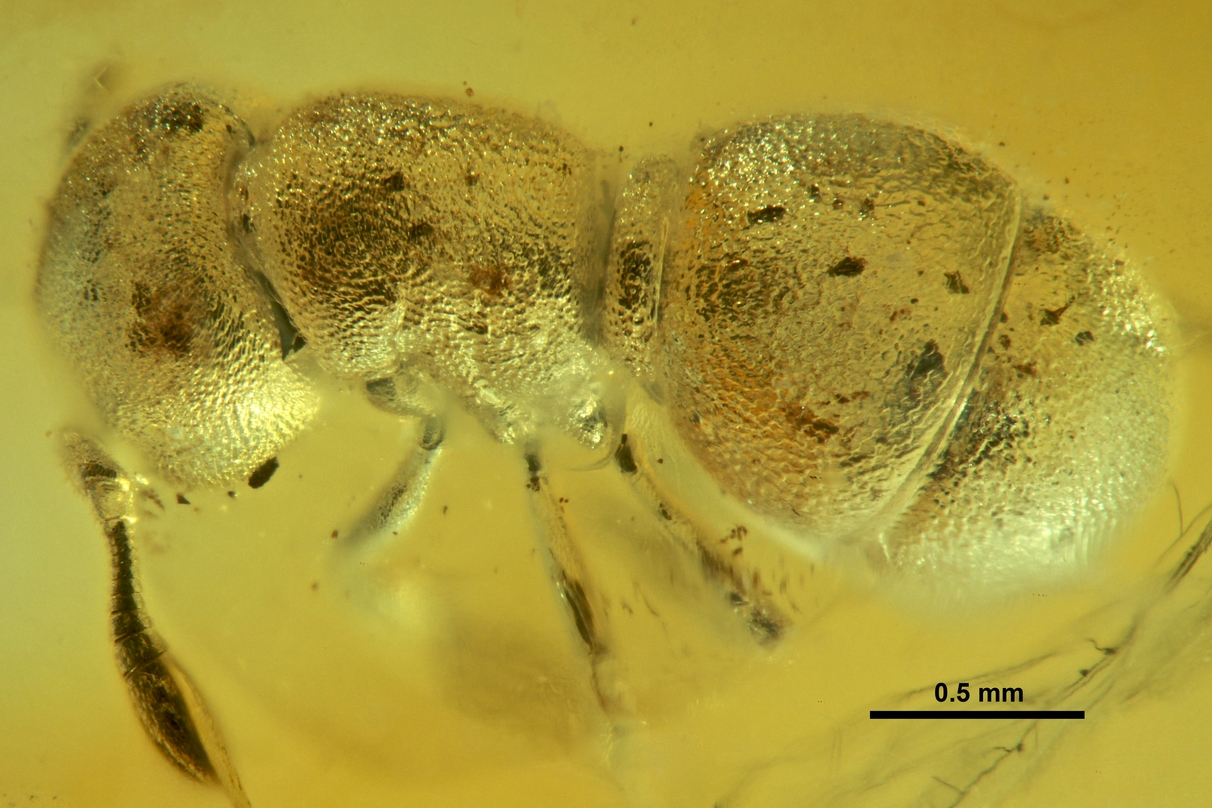
B. electrina holotype worker

This species is identified from a single brownish-black worker with flat laying setae along the body and sparser semi-erect setae that are longer than the flat setae. The semi-erect setae are not seen in B. meieri B. similis or B. wunderlichi, distinguishing B. electrina from workers of the other species. With an approximate total length of 3.49 mm (0.137 in), B. electrina workers are the largest for any Bradoponera species. The ridges running from the eyes are smaller than seen in other species, and they do not cover the antennae bases. The eyes themselves are small with not much convexity and the ommatidia are separated from each other by hairs. The antennae are not as robust as other species, with scapes that protrude past the rear borders of the eyes. The mesosoma is slightly shorter than the head length, with a distinct suture line at the pronotum. The petiole node is scale shaped and nearly four times wider than long, double that of other Bradoponera species.

The species name was coined by Baroni Urbani from the Latin word electrinus which he translated as "made of amber".

=== B. meieri ===
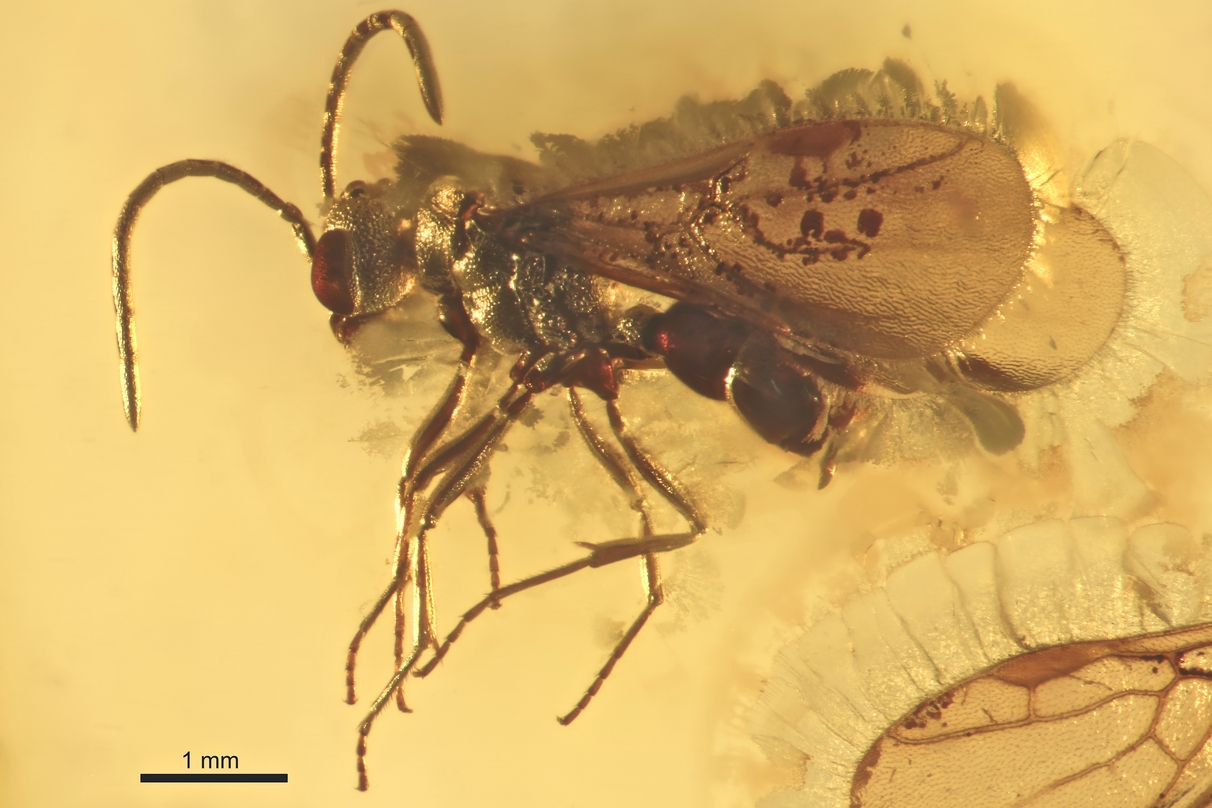
B. meieri male

The type species for the genus, B. meieri is known from three castes, workers, queens, and males. There is little variation in the sizes of the workers, which have lengths ranging between 2.0–2.5 mm (0.079–0.098 in). The bodies, legs and antennae have prolific slight erect to flat laying hairs. The exoskeleton of the head and upper surface of the mesosoma have evenly spaced pits that are about the same diameter as the spacing between the pits. The pits grow smaller and further apart on the gaster, and are partially by the dense flat laying hairs. The rounded rectangular heads have round shallowly domed eyes and the head to mesosoma joint is ringed by a low exoskeletal ridge. The clypeus is distinctly divided into three sections, the large median area and two lateral sections. The lateral strips are narrow, running from the mandible bases up the sides of the median lobe. The median area is slightly rectangular, with the front edge flaring a little past the front edges of the lateral sections. along the back edge it is bordered by the two frontal ridges and the antennae sockets. The antennae have widened flat scapes that reach between towards the back of the head, but not past it. The upper end of the scape has an uneven top with a divot possibly for the base of flagellum when it was at rest. Excluding the last flagellomere, all the segments after the scape are as wide or wider than long, while the tip flagellomere is enlarged to equal the lengths of flagellomeres ten to three.

=== B. similis ===
The single described worker of B. similis has an estimated body length of 2.5 mm (0.098 in). The head has an outline has rounded corners at the rear and the back margin is either slightly concave or straight. There is a raised ridge of exoskeleton that borders the eyes while the eyes themselves are larger than the compound eyes of B. meieri workers. The mesosoma has no visible sutures between the exoskeleton plates, is narrower than tall, and the upper surface has a smooth rounded outline with no indent at the mesopropodem. The head is a rounded rectangular shape, being shorter than long, and a flat to slightly bowed rear margin.

=== B. wunderlichi ===
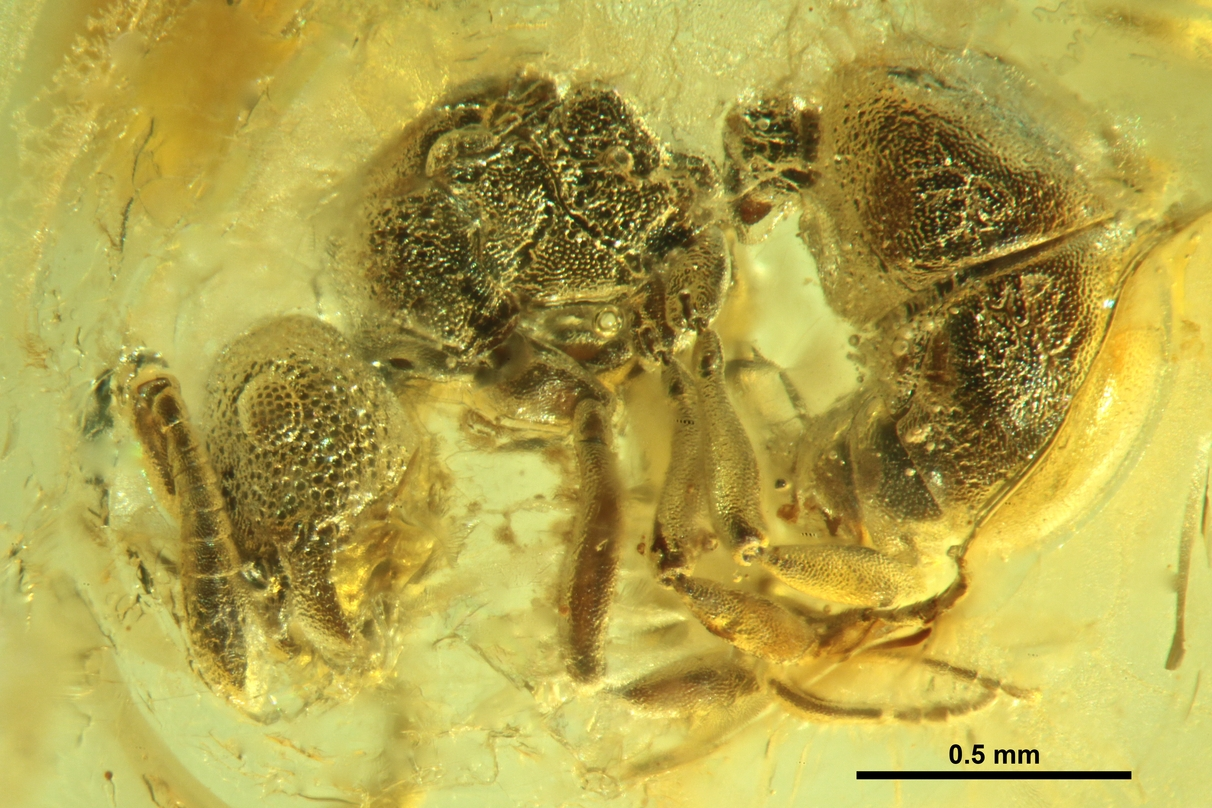
B. wunderlichi holotype worker showing gasteral curve

The species was described from a single wingless female that is approximately 2.53 mm (0.100 in) long. The female has antennae possessing 9 segments, three less than seen in B. meieri queens. The antennae have thick scapes that reach just past the rear margins of the eyes. The basal two antenna segments after the scape are both roughly square in outline, while the next five segments are shorter than wide with a rectangular outline. The mandibles have an overall triangular outline, with a convex curvature to the outside edges and smooth, toothless chewing edges. The dark brownish-black body is covered in fine setae that lay against the exoskeleton. Unlike B. electrina the robust mesosoma is approximately the same length as the head including mandibles. The petiole is short and wide, the width being about double the length in profile, and the frond and rear sides narrow slightly towards the base giving a wedge like outline.

The species epithet "wunderlichi" was chosen by Baroni Urbani as an epithet honoring Jörg Wunderlich, who supplied several of the fossils for examination.
