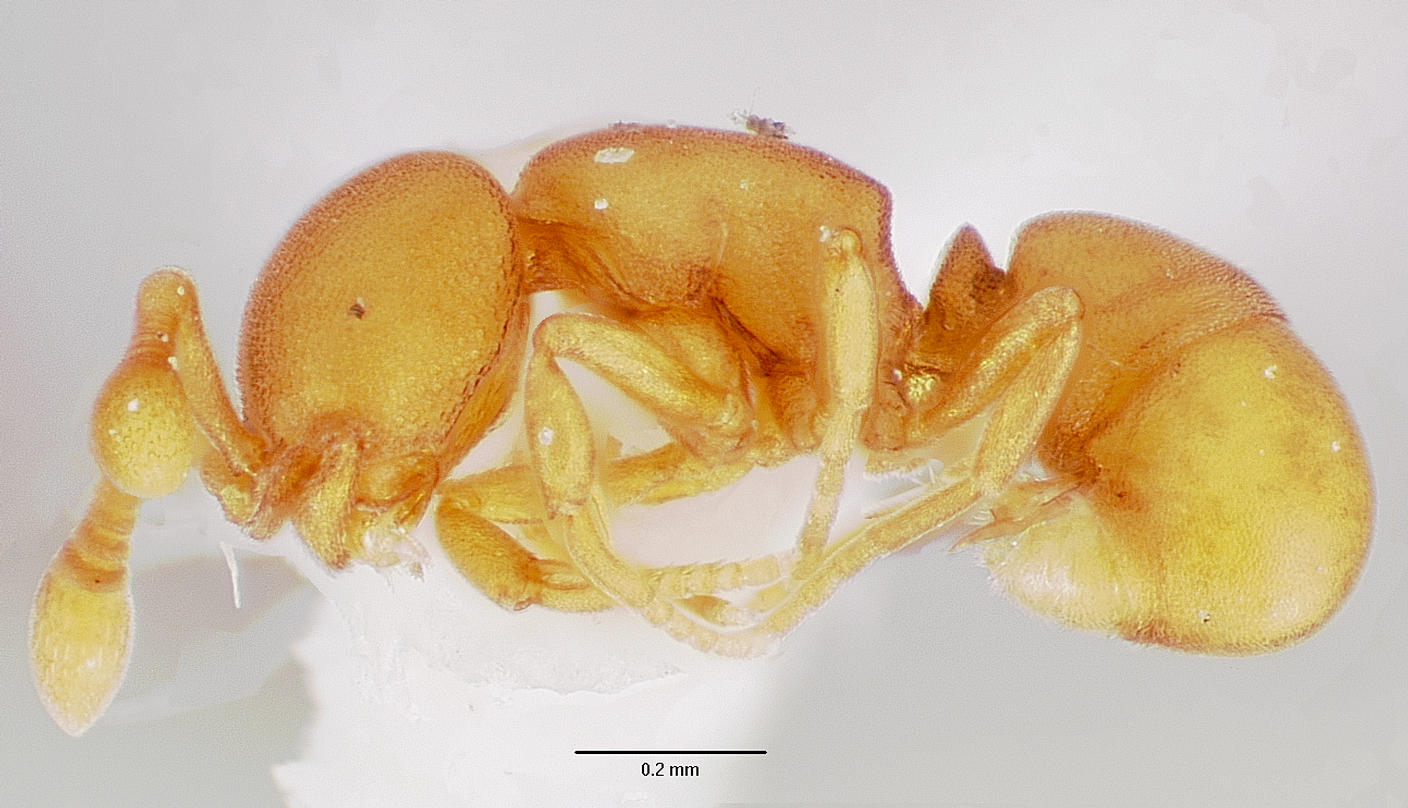
- Discothyrea testacea worker

Scientific classification
- Kingdom: Animalia
- Phylum: Arthropoda
- Class: Insecta
- Order: Hymenoptera
- Family: Formicidae
- Subfamily: Proceratiinae
- Tribe: Proceratiini
- Genus: Discothyrea; Roger, 1863

Type species
- Discothyrea testacea Roger, 1863

Diversity
- 51 species

Synonyms
- Prodiscothyrea Wheeler, 1916; Pseudosysphincta Arnold, 1916

= Discothyrea =

Genus of ants

Discothyrea is a genus of small ants in the subfamily Proceratiinae. The genus is distributed in the tropics and subtropics throughout the world, where they usually nest in rotten wood, in the leaf litter, or under stones. Little is known about their biology, but ants in this genus are thought to be specialist predators of arthropod eggs and have been observed storing eggs in their nests (probably spider eggs).

Two fossil species, D. gigas and D. maya, are known from Dominican and Mexican amber.

== Species ==
- Discothyrea aisnetu Hita-Garcia & Lieberman, 2019
- Discothyrea antarctica Emery, 1895
- Discothyrea athene Hita-Garcia & Lieberman, 2019
- Discothyrea banna Xu et al., 2014
- Discothyrea berlita Fisher, 2005
- Discothyrea bidens Clark, 1928
- Discothyrea bobi Chaul, 2020
- Discothyrea bryanti (Wheeler, 1917)
- Discothyrea chimera Hita-Garcia & Lieberman, 2019
- Discothyrea clavicornis Emery, 1897
- Discothyrea crassicornis Clark, 1926
- Discothyrea damato Hita-Garcia & Lieberman, 2019
- Discothyrea denticulata Weber, 1939
- Discothyrea diana Xu et al., 2014
- Discothyrea dryad Hita-Garcia & Lieberman, 2019
- Discothyrea gaia Hita-Garcia & Lieberman, 2019
- †Discothyrea gigas De Andrade, 1998
- Discothyrea globa Forel, 1905
- Discothyrea gryphon Hita-Garcia & Lieberman, 2019
- Discothyrea hawkesi Hita-Garcia & Lieberman, 2019
- Discothyrea horni Menozzi, 1927
- Discothyrea humilis Weber, 1939
- Discothyrea icta Weber, 1939
- Discothyrea isthmica Weber, 1940
- Discothyrea kalypso Hita-Garcia & Lieberman, 2019
- Discothyrea kamiteta Kubota & Terayama, 1999
- Discothyrea leae Clark, 1934
- Discothyrea maia Hita-Garcia & Lieberman, 2019
- †Discothyrea maya De Andrade, 1998
- Discothyrea michelae Hita-Garcia & Lieberman, 2019
- Discothyrea mixta Brown, 1958
- Discothyrea neotropica Bruch, 1919
- Discothyrea oculata Emery, 1901
- Discothyrea patrizii Weber, 1949
- Discothyrea penthos Hita-Garcia & Lieberman, 2019
- Discothyrea periyarensis Bharti et al., 2015
- Discothyrea poweri (Arnold, 1916)
- Discothyrea remingtoni Brown, 1948
- Discothyrea sauteri Forel, 1912
- Discothyrea schulzei Hita-Garcia & Lieberman, 2019
- Discothyrea sexarticulata Borgmeier, 1954
- Discothyrea soesilae Makhan, 2007
- Discothyrea sringerensis Zacharias & Rajan, 2004
- Discothyrea stumperi Baroni Urbani, 1977
- Discothyrea testacea Roger, 1863
- Discothyrea traegaordhi Santschi, 1914
- Discothyrea turtoni Clark, 1934
- Discothyrea velutina (Wheeler, 1916)
- Discothyrea venus Hita-Garcia & Lieberman, 2019
- Discothyrea wakanda Hita-Garcia & Lieberman, 2019
- Discothyrea yueshen Terayama, 2009
