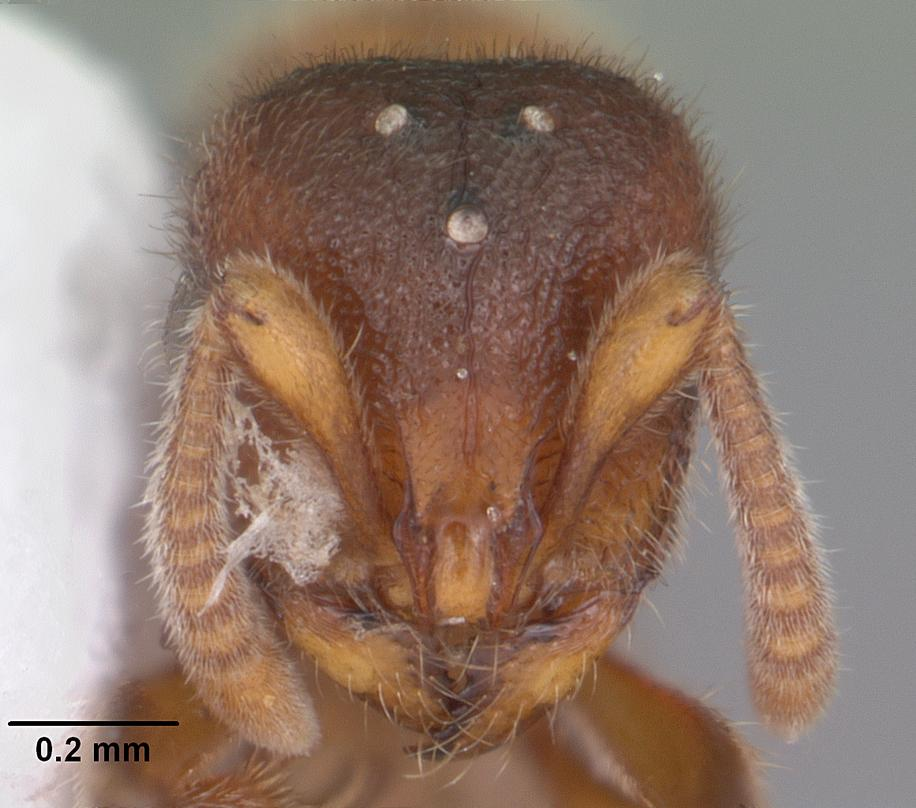

Scientific classification
- Domain: Eukaryota
- Kingdom: Animalia
- Phylum: Arthropoda
- Class: Insecta
- Order: Hymenoptera
- Family: Formicidae
- Genus: Proceratium
- Species: P. silaceum

Binomial name
- Proceratium silaceum Roger, 1863

= Proceratium silaceum =

Species of ant

Proceratium silaceum is a species of ant in the family Formicidae.

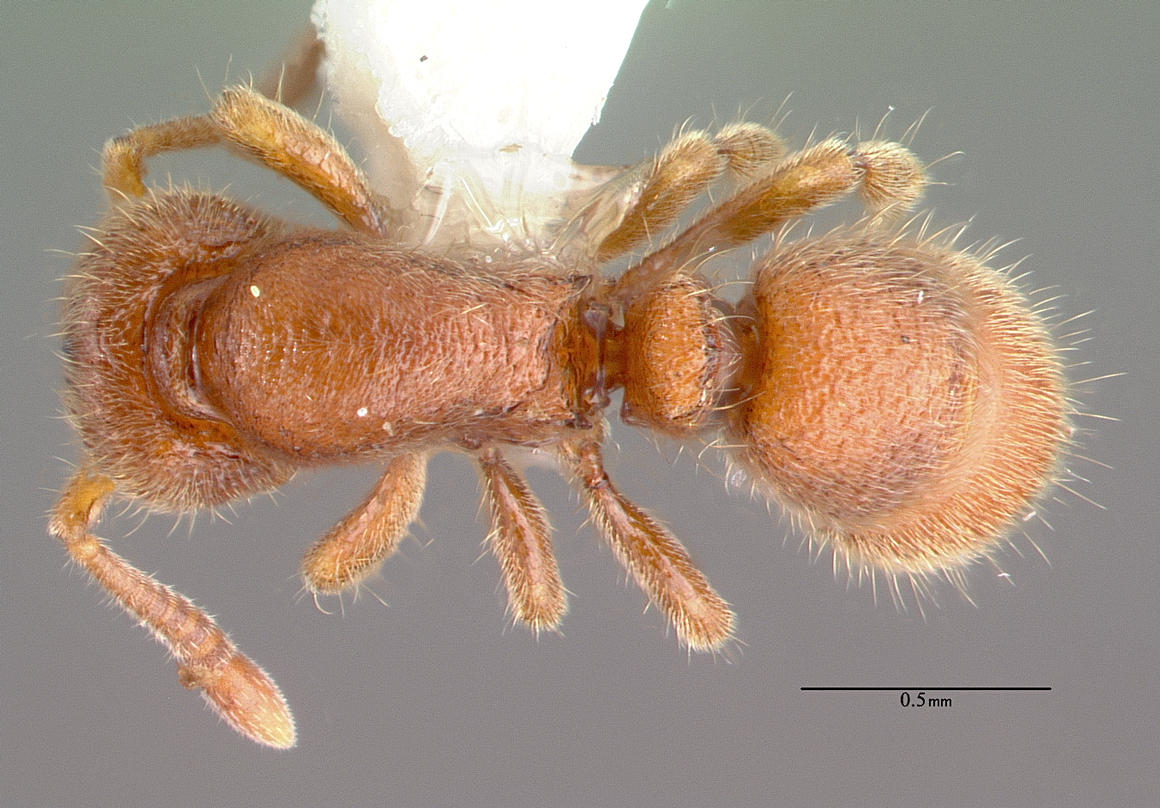

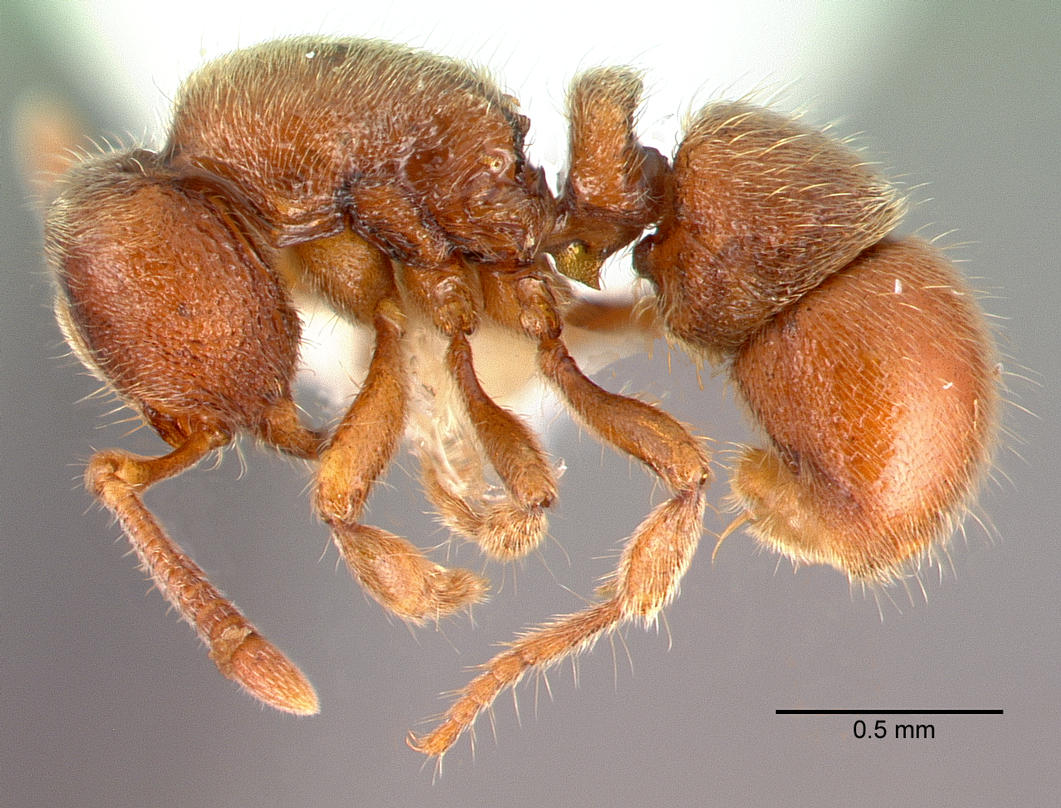
