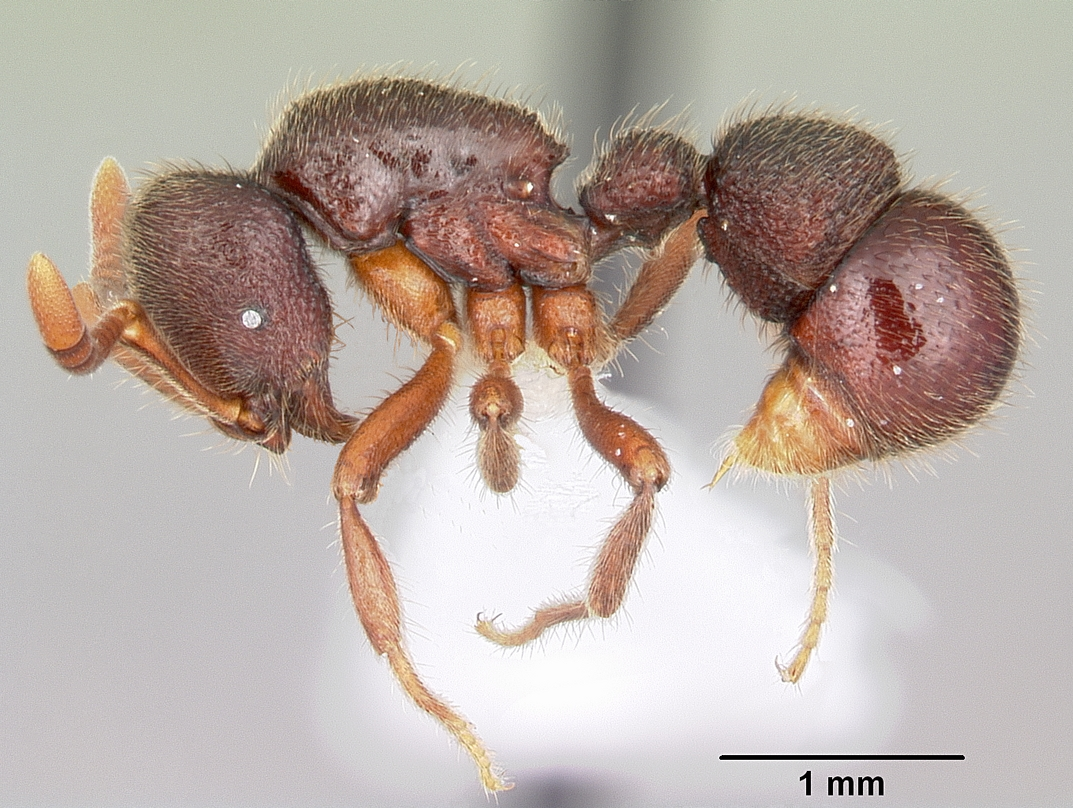
- Proceratium google worker, holotype specimen

Scientific classification
- Domain: Eukaryota
- Kingdom: Animalia
- Phylum: Arthropoda
- Class: Insecta
- Order: Hymenoptera
- Family: Formicidae
- Subfamily: Proceratiinae; Emery, 1895

Type genus
- Proceratium

Diversity
- 4 genera

= Proceratiinae =

Subfamily of ants

Proceratiinae is a subfamily of ants in the poneromorph subfamilies group, with three extant genera, of which most are tropical or subtropical, although overall distribution is worldwide.

== Identification ==
The ants are relatively small to medium in size, with colonies generally containing less than 100 individuals. They are similar to Ponerinae, except the promesonotal suture is fused and the frontal lobes are elevated (rather than transverse) and frequently reduced. In addition, the antennal sockets are exposed in a full-face (frontal) view of the head, and in most species, abdominal tergite 4 is much enlarged and vaulted, with abdominal sternite 4 being correspondingly reduced in size.

== Systematics ==
The subfamily was created in 2003 when Barry Bolton divided the Ponerinae subfamily into six subfamilies. Proceratiinae is further divided into the tribes Proceratiini and Probolomyrmecini, and contains three extant genera and one extinct genus.

- Proceratiinae Emery, 1895
  - Proceratiini Emery, 1895
    - Discothyrea Roger, 1863
    - Proceratium Roger, 1863
    - †Bradoponera Mayr, 1868
  - Probolomyrmecini Perrault, 2000
    - Probolomyrmex Mayr, 1901
