= List of moths of Australia (Tineidae) =

Partial list of Australian moths

This is a list of the Australian moth species of the family Tineidae. It also acts as an index to the species articles and forms part of the full List of moths of Australia.

== Dryadaulinae ==
- Dryadaula anthracorma Meyrick, 1915
- Dryadaula brontoctypa (Meyrick, 1880)
- Dryadaula epixantha (Turner, 1923)
- Dryadaula glycinopa Meyrick, 1893
- Dryadaula melanorma (Meyrick, 1893)
- Dryadaula mesosticha (Turner, 1923)
- Dryadaula napaea Meyrick, 1905
- Dryadaula placens (Meyrick, 1920)
- Dryadaula selenophanes (Meyrick, 1880)

== Erechthiinae ==
- Comodica cirrhopolia (Turner, 1923)
- Comodica crypsicroca Turner, 1923
- Comodica drepanosema Turner, 1923
- Comodica tetracercella Meyrick, 1880
- Comodica tigrina Turner, 1917
- Erechthias acontistes Meyrick, 1880
- Erechthias elaeorrhoa Meyrick, 1880
- Erechthias eurynipha (Turner, 1923)
- Erechthias acontotypa Turner, 1926
- Erechthias aellophora Meyrick, 1880
- Erechthias articulosa Meyrick, 1921
- Erechthias trigonosema (Turner, 1923)
- Erechthias beeblebroxi Robinson & Nielsen, 1993
- Erechthias cyanosticta (Lower, 1916)
- Erechthias orchestris (Turner, 1932)
- Erechthias photophanes (Meyrick, 1917)
- Erechthias deloneura (Turner, 1923)
- Erechthias diacrita (Turner, 1923)
- Erechthias diaphora (Meyrick, 1893)
- Erechthias erebocosma (Meyrick, 1893)
- Erechthias iseres (Turner, 1917)
- Erechthias epomadia (Turner, 1923)
- Erechthias acroleuca Turner, 1923
- Erechthias citrinopa (Lower, 1905)
- Erechthias epispora (Lower, 1905)
- Erechthias iuloptera (Meyrick, 1880)
- Erechthias minuscula (Walsingham, 1897)
- Erechthias mystacinella (Walker, 1864)
- Erechthias niphadopla Meyrick, 1880
- Erechthias oxytona (Meyrick, 1893)
- Erechthias celetica Turner, 1923
- Erechthias polionota Turner, 1923
- Erechthias polyplecta Turner, 1923
- Erechthias centroscia (Turner, 1933)
- Erechthias scythromorpha (Turner, 1926)
- Erechthias sinapifera (Turner, 1926)
- Erechthias simulans (Butler, 1882)
- Erechthias ancistrosema Turner, 1939
- Erechthias niphoplaca (Turner, 1923)
- Erechthias oxymacha (Meyrick, 1893)
- Erechthias phileris (Meyrick, 1893)
- Erechthias symmacha (Meyrick, 1893)
- Erechthias zebrina (Butler, 1881)
- Tinea dicharacta Meyrick, 1893
- Tinea leptocirrha Turner, 1926
- Tinea muricata Meyrick, 1893
- Tinea peristilpna Turner, 1926
- Tinea pherauges Turner, 1923
- Tinea sulfurata Turner, 1933

The following species belongs to the subfamily Erechthiinae, but has not been assigned to a genus yet. Given here is the original name given to the species when it was first described:

- Comodica dochmogramma Lower, 1916
- Erechthias euthydroma Meyrick, 1921
- Decadarchis hyperacma Meyrick, 1915
- Ereunetis streptogramma Lower, 1905

== Hapsiferinae ==
- Parochmastis dromaea (Turner, 1926)
- Parochmastis styracodes Meyrick, 1917
- Tiquadra atomarcha (Meyrick, 1917)
- Trachycentra rhynchitis Meyrick, 1938

== Hieroxestinae ==
- Amphixystis antiloga (Meyrick, 1915)
- Amphixystis hypolampes (Turner, 1923)
- Asymplecta aplectodes (Turner, 1923)
- Opogona asema (Turner, 1900)
- Opogona basilissa (Turner, 1917)
- Opogona calculata Meyrick, 1919
- Opogona caryospila Meyrick, 1920
- Opogona cataclasta Meyrick, 1915
- Opogona chrysophanes Meyrick, 1915
- Opogona citrolopha Meyrick, 1932
- Opogona cleonyma (Meyrick, 1897)
- Opogona comptella (Walker, 1864)
- Opogona confinis Turner, 1926
- Opogona conjurata (Meyrick, 1920)
- Opogona crypsipyra Turner, 1923
- Opogona fascigera Meyrick, 1915
- Opogona fatima Meyrick, 1921
- Opogona glycyphaga Meyrick, 1915
- Opogona micranthes (Meyrick, 1897)
- Opogona nebularis (Meyrick, 1897)
- Opogona omoscopa (Meyrick, 1893)
- Opogona orthotis (Meyrick, 1897)
- Opogona papayae Turner, 1923
- Opogona promalacta Meyrick, 1915
- Opogona protodoxa (Meyrick, 1897)
- Opogona sarophila Meyrick, 1915
- Opogona scalena (Meyrick, 1897)
- Opogona stenocraspeda (Meyrick, 1897)
- Opogona stereodyta (Meyrick, 1897)
- Opogona tetrasema (Turner, 1917)
- Opogona tristicta (Meyrick, 1897)
- Phaeoses caenologa (Meyrick, 1915)
- Phaeoses flabilis (Turner, 1923)
- Phaeoses leucoprosopa (Turner, 1923)

== Meessiinae ==
- Eudarcia anaglypta (Meyrick, 1893)
- Eudarcia isoploca (Meyrick, 1919)
- Oenoe eupasta (Turner, 1933)
- Oenoe hemiphara (Meyrick, 1893)
- Oenoe ocymorpha (Meyrick, 1893)
- Tenaga nigripunctella (Haworth, 1828)
- Xeringinia altilis (Meyrick, 1893)

== Myrmecozelinae ==
- Analytarcha colleta (Meyrick, 1893)
- Analytarcha cyathodes Meyrick, 1921
- Analytarcha ochroxantha (Turner, 1900)
- Analytarcha trissoleuca (Turner, 1926)
- Ectropoceros ecdela (Turner, 1926)
- Ectropoceros optabilis (Meyrick, 1916)
- Ectropoceros ostrina (Meyrick, 1916)
- Ectropoceros pterocosma (Meyrick, 1916)
- Gerontha acrosthenia Zagulyajev, 1972
- Harmaclona entripta (Meyrick, 1917)
- Mesopherna palustris Meyrick, 1893
- Metapherna amaurodes (Meyrick, 1893)
- Metapherna castella (Walker, 1863)
- Metapherna isomacra (Meyrick, 1893)
- Metapherna salsa (Meyrick, 1920)
- Mimoscopa ochetaula Meyrick, 1893
- Moerarchis australasiella (Donovan, 1805)
- Moerarchis clathrata (R. Felder & Rogenhofer, 1875)
- Moerarchis hypomacra (Turner, 1923)
- Moerarchis inconcisella (Walker, 1863)
- Moerarchis lapidea Turner, 1927
- Moerarchis placomorpha Meyrick, 1922
- Moerarchis pyrochroa (Meyrick, 1893)
- Sarocrania ischnophylla Turner, 1923
- Timaea bivittatella Walker, 1863

== Nemapogoninae ==
- Nemapogon granella (Linnaeus, 1758)
- Vanna bisepta (Meyrick, 1893)

== Perissomasticinae ==
- Edosa abathra (Meyrick, 1920)
- Edosa balanosema (Meyrick, 1893)
- Edosa fraudulens (Rosenstock, 1885)
- Edosa haplodora (Meyrick, 1917)
- Edosa hemisema (Lower, 1903)
- Edosa hypocritica (Meyrick, 1893)
- Edosa idiochroa (Lower, 1918)
- Edosa irruptella (Walker, 1864)
- Edosa meliphanes (Meyrick, 1893)
- Edosa ochracea (Meyrick, 1893)
- Edosa ochranthes (Meyrick, 1893)
- Edosa porphyrophaes (Turner, 1917)
- Edosa purella (Walker, 1863)
- Edosa talantias (Meyrick, 1893)
- Edosa tyrannica (Meyrick, 1893)
- Edosa xystidophora (Meyrick, 1893)

== Scardiinae ==
- Morophaga clonodes (Meyrick, 1893)
- Tinissa cinerascens Meyrick, 1910
- Tinissa rigida Meyrick, 1910

== Setomorphinae ==
- Lindera tessellatella Blanchard, 1852
- Setomorpha rutella Zeller, 1852

== Tineinae ==
- Acridotarsa celsella (Walker, 1863)
- Acridotarsa conglomerata (Meyrick, 1922)
- Acridotarsa mylitis Meyrick, 1893
- Craniosara pyrotricha (Meyrick, 1893)
- Crypsithyris illaetabilis Turner, 1926
- Crypsithyrodes concolorella (Walker, 1863)
- Hippiochaetes chrysaspis Meyrick, 1880
- Monopis argillacea (Meyrick, 1893)
- Monopis chrysogramma (Lower, 1899)
- Monopis cirrhospila Turner, 1923
- Monopis crocicapitella (Clemens, 1859)
- Monopis ethelella (Newman, 1856)
- Monopis icterogastra (Zeller, 1852)
- Monopis meliorella (Walker, 1863)
- Monopis monacha Zagulajev, 1972
- Monopis ochroptila Turner, 1923
- Monopis pentadisca Meyrick, 1924
- Monopis stichomela (Lower, 1900)
- Monopis trigonoleuca Turner, 1917
- Niditinea fuscella (Linnaeus, 1758)
- Phereoeca praecox Gozmány & Vári, 1973
- Praeacedes atomosella (Walker, 1863)
- Thomintarra primaeva (Meyrick, 1893)
- Tinea chaotica Meyrick, 1893
- Tinea columbariella Wocke, 1877
- Tinea corynephora Turner, 1927
- Tinea drymonoma Turner, 1923
- Tinea dubiella Stainton, 1859
- Tinea flavescentella Haworth, 1828
- Tinea melanoptycha (Turner, 1939)
- Tinea murariella Staudinger, 1859
- Tinea pallescentella Stainton, 1851
- Tinea pellionella Linnaeus, 1758
- Tinea porphyrota Meyrick, 1893
- Tinea translucens Meyrick, 1917
- Tinea tridectis Meyrick, 1893
- Tineola bisselliella (Hummel, 1823)
- Trichophaga tapetzella (Linnaeus, 1758)
