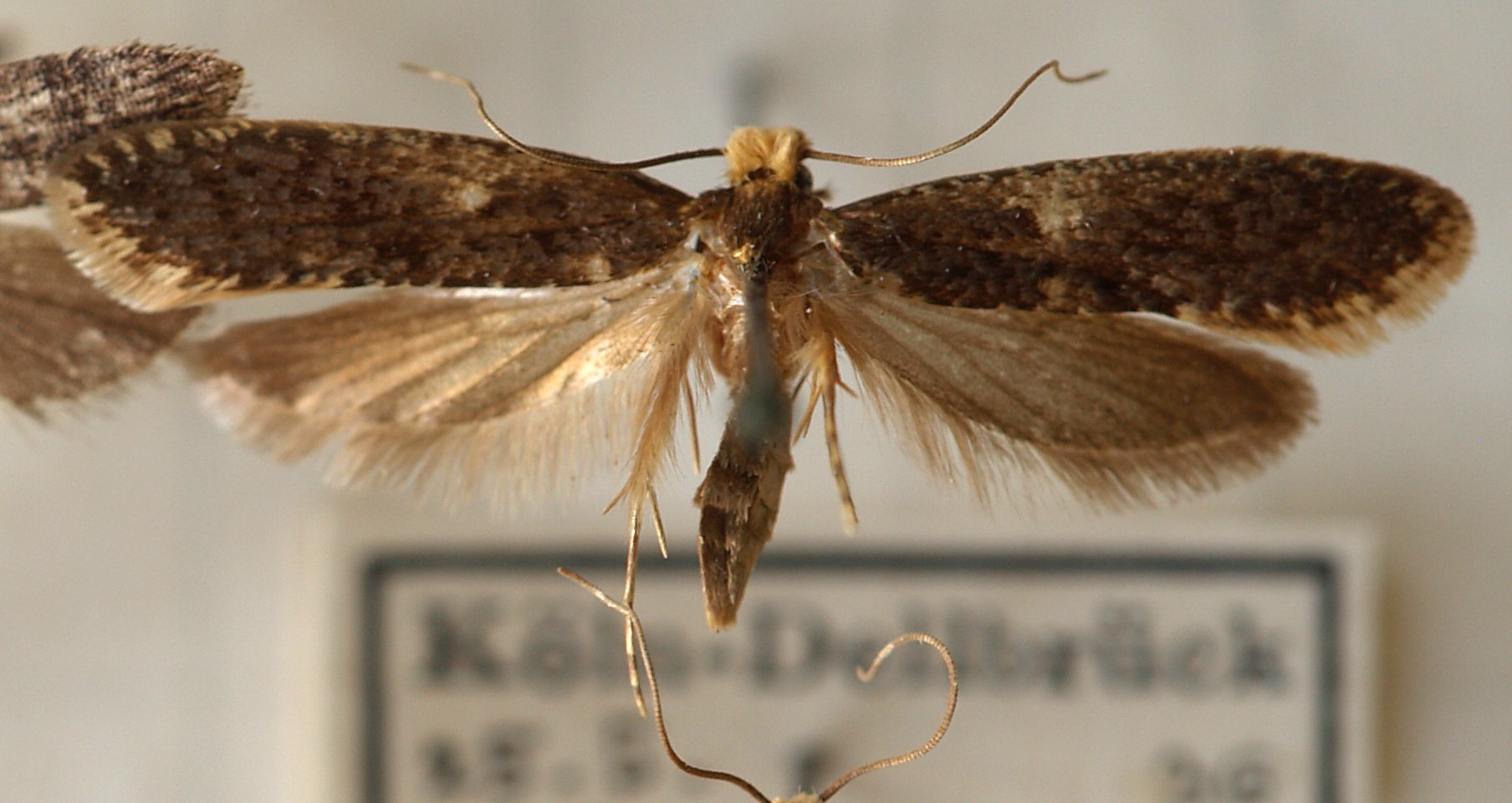
- Adult specimen
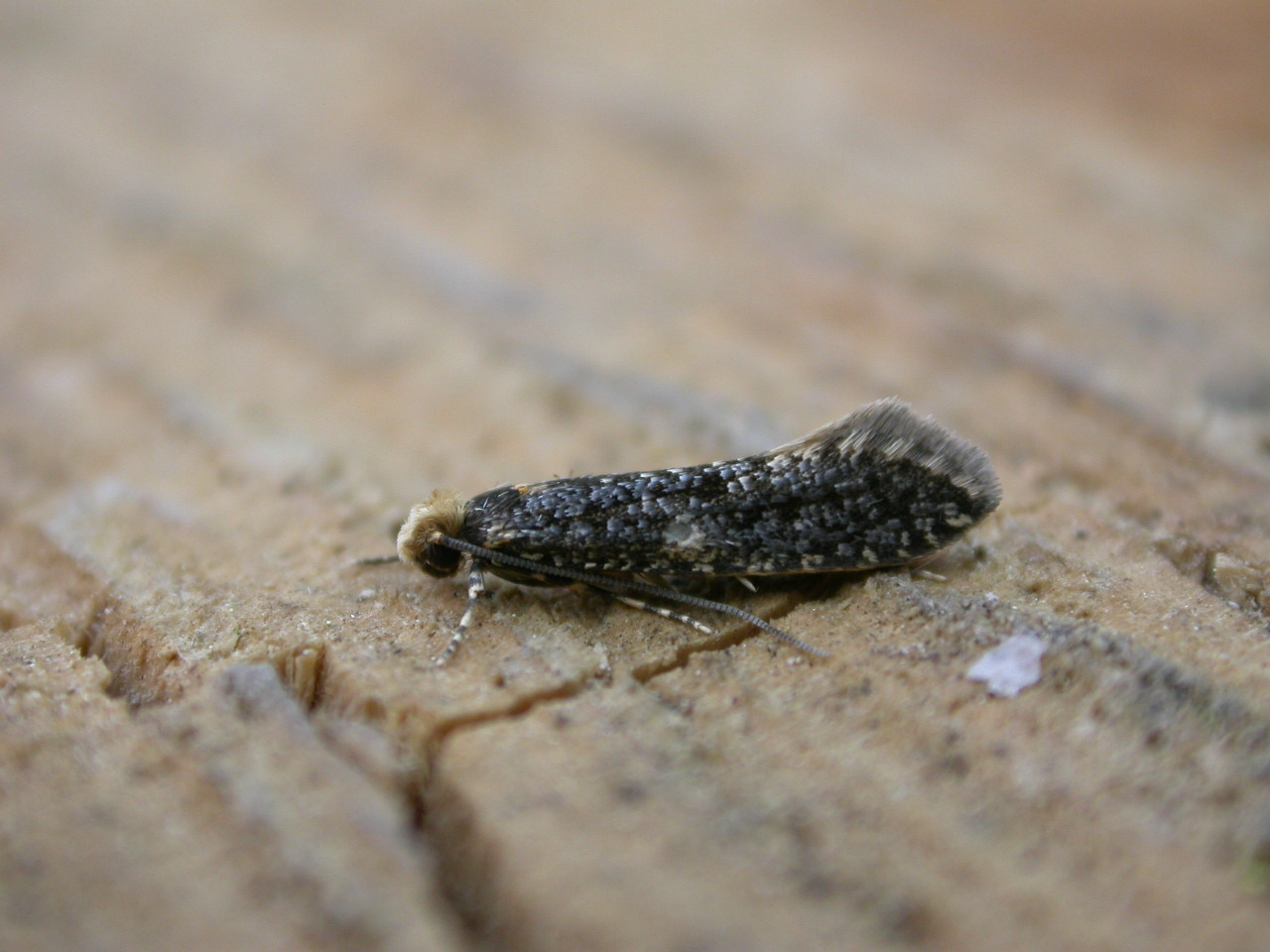
- Adult specimen

Scientific classification
- Kingdom: Animalia
- Phylum: Arthropoda
- Clade: Pancrustacea
- Class: Insecta
- Order: Lepidoptera
- Family: Tineidae
- Genus: Monopis
- Species: M. laevigella

Binomial name
- Monopis laevigella (Denis & Schiffermüller, 1775)

Synonyms
- Numerous, see text

= Monopis laevigella =

Species of moth

Monopis laevigella, the skin moth, is a species of tineoid moth. It belongs to the fungus moth family (Tineidae), and therein to the nominate subfamily Tineinae. It is (under its junior synonym Tinea rusticella) the type species of the genus Monopis and its junior objective synonym Hyalospila. As with the common clothes moth (Tineola bisselliella), earlier authors frequently misapplied the name Tinea vestianella to the present species.

It is not uncommon all across western Palearctic as well as in North America. It has not been recorded in Slovenia yet, but given that it occurs in all neighboring countries, it probably has simply been overlooked. Its absence from some Mediterranean islands may be genuine however.

== Description and ecology ==
The adults of this small moth have a wingspan of 13–20 mm. On the wing around May to September (depending on the location), they are nocturnal and come out at dusk. They have dark brown forewings with a white fringe and the translucent center spot characteristic for the genus Monopis, but lack the white markings adjacent to it found in many congeners. The hindwings are lighter brown-grey; they are surrounded by a long-haired fringe, as usual for fungus moths and relatives. The body is dark brown, and the head bears a tuft of reddish-ochre hair.

Two generations per year may occur as far north as southern England. Otherwise, the caterpillar larvae are found in the colder months only. They generally feed on animal detritus. They have been recorded from dried-out animal carcasses, in the debris of bird nests and on owl pellets. They have also been found to eat feathers, furs, hairs, carpets, rags and rotted fabrics.

== Synonyms ==
Invalid scientific names (junior synonyms and others) of the skin moth are:

- Blabophanes semispilotella Strand, 1900
- Monopis rusticella (Hübner, 1796)
- Monopis saturella (Haworth, 1828)
- Recurvaria rustica Haworth, 1828 (unjustified emendation)
- Tinea laevigella Denis & Schiffermüller, 1775
- Tinea rusticella Hübner, 1796
- Tinea saturella Haworth, 1828
- Tinea vestianella (sensu auct., non Linnaeus, 1758: preoccupied)

Blabophanes semispilotella has been believed to refer to the same animal as M. weaverella, but the latter seems to be a distinct species, while the former is not even a subspecies of M. laevigella but merely a chance form.
