= Setomorphinae =

Scientific classification
- Kingdom: Animalia
- Phylum: Arthropoda
- Clade: Pancrustacea
- Class: Insecta
- Order: Lepidoptera
- Family: Tineidae
- Subfamily: Setomorphinae; Walsingham, 1891

Type genus
- Setomorpha Zeller, 1852

Subfamily of moths

The Setomorphinae are a subfamily of moth of the family Tineidae.

== Genera ==
- Lindera
- Prosetomorpha
- Setomorpha
