= Wool moth =

Wool moth may refer to two distinct moths:

- The Australian moth Monopis icterogastra, which looks "woolly".
- The cosmopolitan moth Tineola bisselliella, which eats wool cloth.
