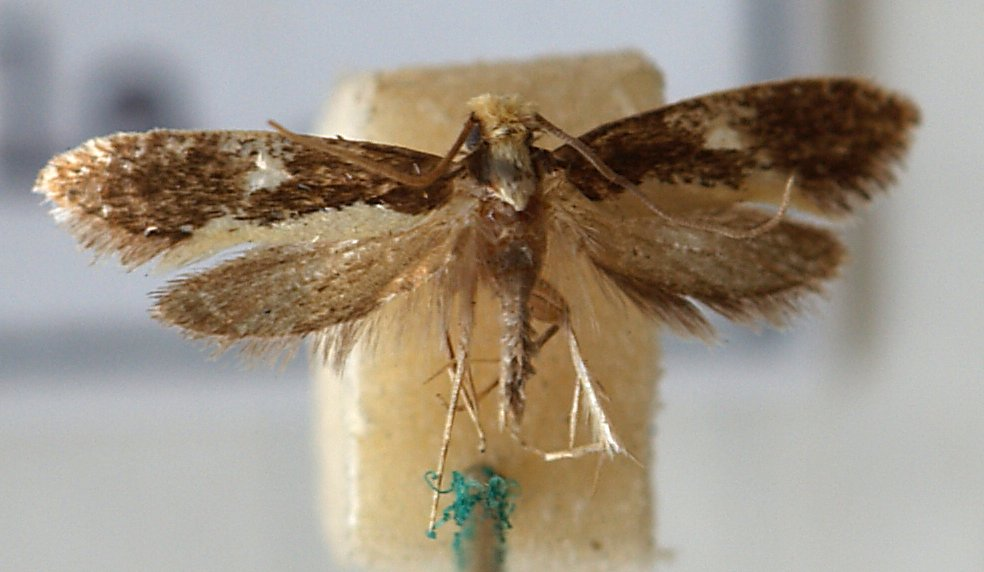
- Adult specimen of Monopis obviella Note translucent spot in forewing

Scientific classification
- Kingdom: Animalia
- Phylum: Arthropoda
- Clade: Pancrustacea
- Class: Insecta
- Order: Lepidoptera
- Family: Tineidae
- Subfamily: Tineinae
- Genus: Monopis; Hübner, 1825

Type species
- Tinea rusticella Hübner, 1796

Species
- Numerous, see text

Synonyms
- Blabophanes Zeller, 1852; Eusynopa Lower, 1903; Hyalospila Herrich-Schäffer, 1853; Rhitia Walker, 1864

= Monopis =

Genus of moths

Monopis is a genus of the fungus moths in the family Tineidae.

A typical feature of these moths is a semi-transparent pale spot near the middle of the forewings. There are usually contrasting white markings adjacent to it. Otherwise, the forewings are generally unpatterned and brown to blackish-grey in color.

== Selected species ==
Species currently placed in Monopis include:

- Monopis argillacea (Meyrick, 1893)
- Monopis burmanni Petersen, 1979
- Monopis chrysogramma (Lower, 1899)
- Monopis cirrhospila Turner, 1923
- Monopis congestella (Walker, 1864)
- Monopis crocicapitella (Clemens, 1859) (= M. heringi, M. hyalinella, M. lombardica)
- Monopis dimorphella Dugdale, 1971
- Monopis dorsistrigella (Clemens, 1859) (= M. subjunctella)
- Monopis ethelella (Newman, 1856)
- Monopis fenestratella (Heyden, 1863)
- Monopis henderickxi Gaedike & Karsholt 2001
- Monopis icterogastra – wool moth
- Monopis imella
- Monopis jacobsi Gozmány, 1967
- Monopis laevigella – skin moth
- Monopis longella
- Monopis marginistrigella (Chambers, 1873) (= M. irrorella)
- Monopis megalodelta Meyrick, 1908
- Monopis meliorella (Walker, 1863)
- Monopis monacha Zagulajev, 1972
- Monopis monachella
- Monopis mycetophilella Powell, 1967
- Monopis nigricantella (Millière, 1872)
- Monopis obviella
- Monopis ochroptila Turner, 1923
- Monopis ornithias (Meyrick, 1888)
- Monopis pallidella Zagulajev, 1955
- Monopis pavlovskii Zagulajev, 1955
- Monopis pentadisca Meyrick, 1924
- Monopis spilotella (Tengström, 1848) (= M. biflavimaculella, M. halospila, M. insignisella)
- Monopis stichomela (Lower, 1900)
- Monopis straminella Zagulajev, 1958
- Monopis trigonoleuca Turner, 1917
- Monopis typhlopa Meyrick, 1925
- Monopis weaverella (Scott, 1858)

Also placed here by some authors is Reisserita barbarosi.
