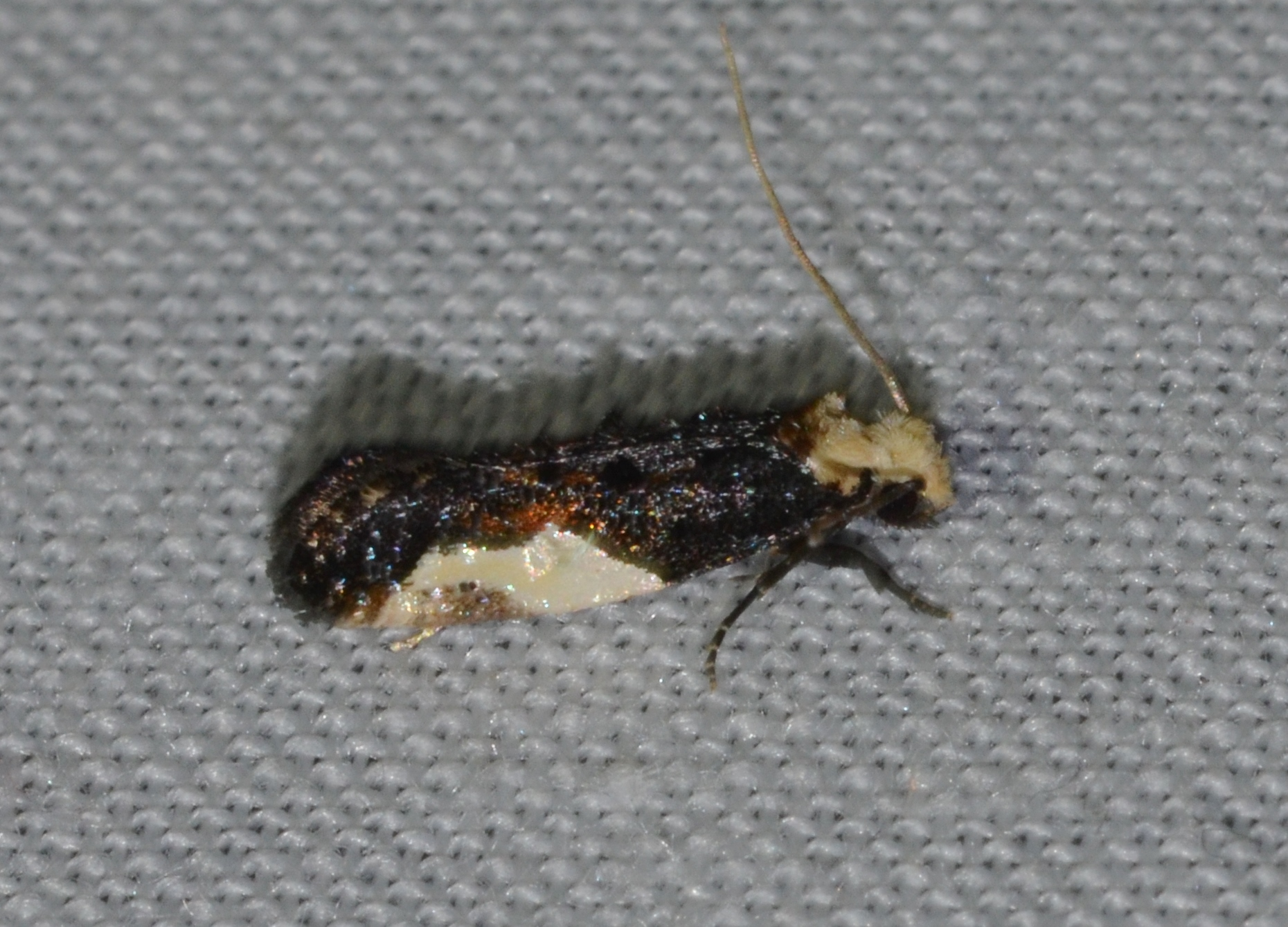

Scientific classification
- Kingdom: Animalia
- Phylum: Arthropoda
- Class: Insecta
- Order: Lepidoptera
- Family: Tineidae
- Genus: Monopis
- Species: M. longella

Binomial name
- Monopis longella (Walker, 1863)

Synonyms
- Tinea longella Walker, 1863; Blabophanes longella; Monopis pseudagyrta Meyrick, 1919; Monopis pavlovskii Zagulajev, 1955

= Monopis longella =

Species of moth

Monopis longella is a moth of the family Tineidae. It has been recorded from China, Korea India, Japan, Malaysia, Philippines, Russia and Thailand and is an introduced species in North America, where it has been recorded from New York to central Florida and west to Michigan.
