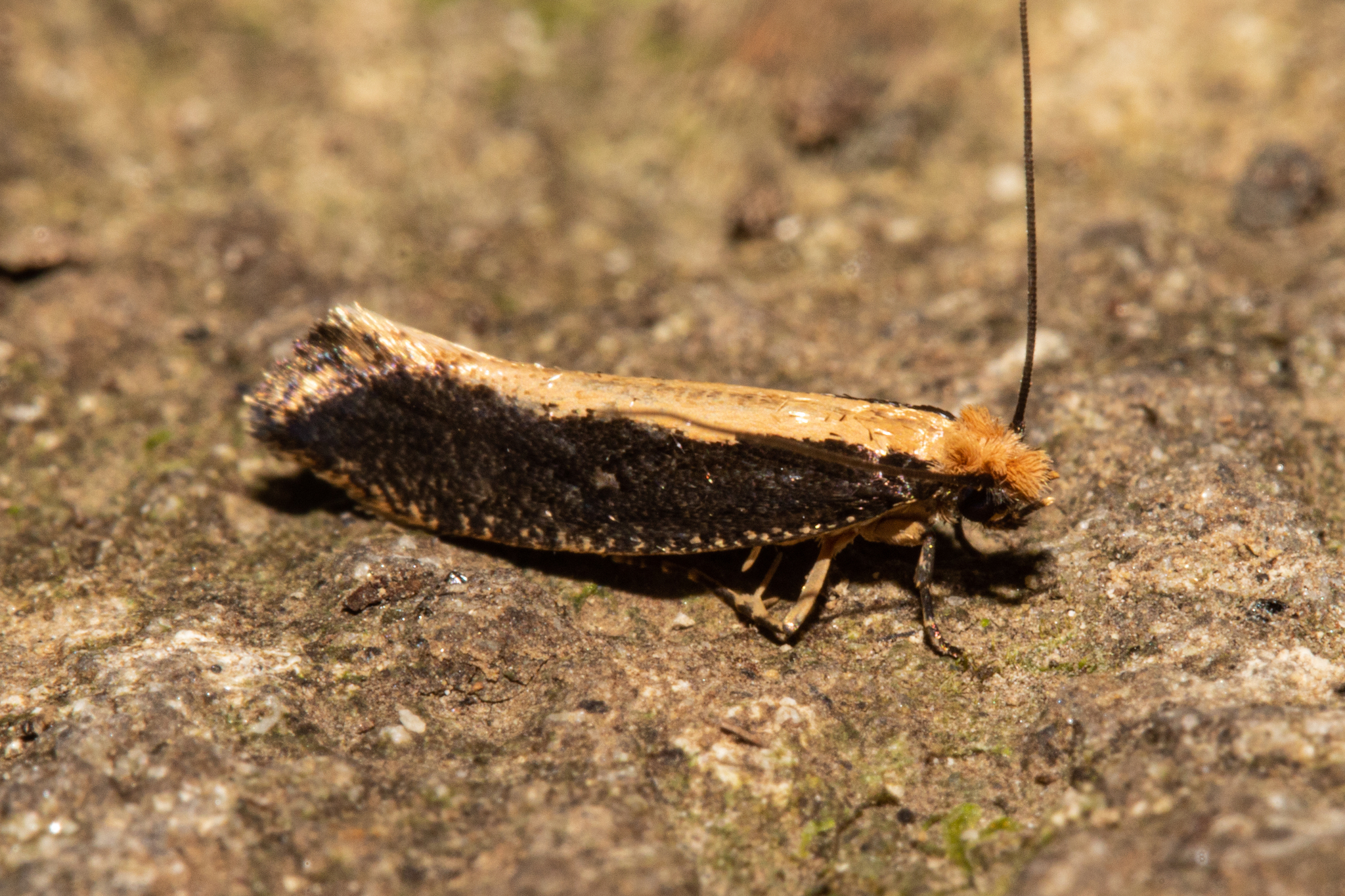
- Specimen seen near the Whangārei Heads

Scientific classification
- Kingdom: Animalia
- Phylum: Arthropoda
- Class: Insecta
- Order: Lepidoptera
- Family: Tineidae
- Genus: Monopis
- Species: M. dimorphella

Binomial name
- Monopis dimorphella Dugdale, 1971

= Monopis dimorphella =

Species of insect

Monopis dimorphella is a species of moth in the family Tineidae. It was described by John S. Dugdale in 1971. This species is endemic to New Zealand.
