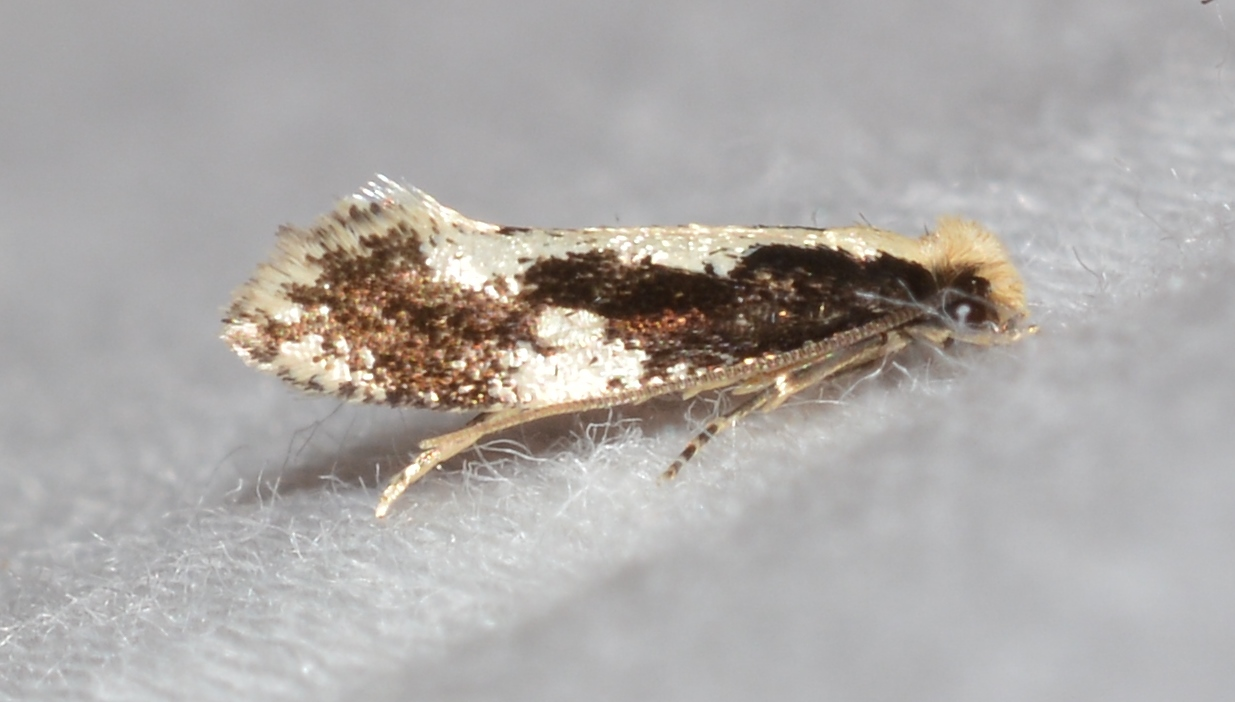

Scientific classification
- Kingdom: Animalia
- Phylum: Arthropoda
- Clade: Pancrustacea
- Class: Insecta
- Order: Lepidoptera
- Family: Tineidae
- Genus: Monopis
- Species: M. dorsistrigella

Binomial name
- Monopis dorsistrigella (Clemens, 1859)

= Monopis dorsistrigella =

Species of moth

Monopis dorsistrigella, the skunkback monopis, is a species of clothes moth in the family Tineidae.

The MONA or Hodges number for Monopis dorsistrigella is 0416.
