= Monopis typhlopa =

Scientific classification
- Kingdom: Animalia
- Phylum: Arthropoda
- Class: Insecta
- Order: Lepidoptera
- Family: Tineidae
- Genus: Monopis
- Species: M. typhlopa

Binomial name
- Monopis typhlopa Meyrick, 1925

Species of moth

Monopis typhlopa is a species of moth in the family Tineidae. It was described by Edward Meyrick in 1925. This species is endemic to New Zealand.
