= Monopis jacobsi =

Scientific classification
- Kingdom: Animalia
- Phylum: Arthropoda
- Clade: Pancrustacea
- Class: Insecta
- Order: Lepidoptera
- Family: Tineidae
- Genus: Monopis
- Species: M. jacobsi

Binomial name
- Monopis jacobsi Gozmány, 1967

Species of moth

Monopis jacobsi is a species of moth in the family Tineidae. It is found in Nigeria. It was described by Hungarian entomologist László Anthony Gozmány in 1967.

This species has a wingspan of 10 millimetres (0.39 in).
