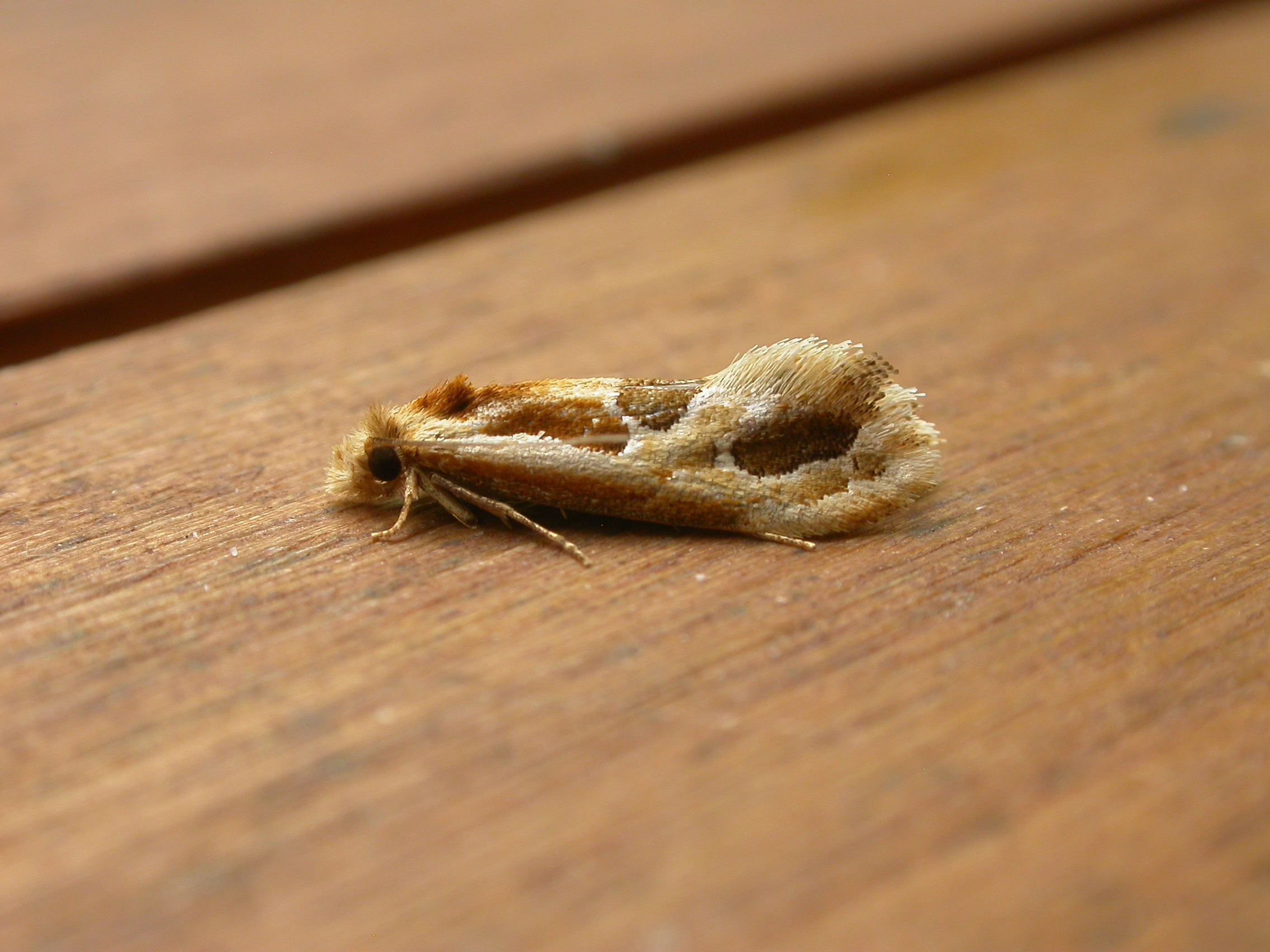
- Moerarchis placomorpha

Scientific classification
- Kingdom: Animalia
- Phylum: Arthropoda
- Clade: Pancrustacea
- Class: Insecta
- Order: Lepidoptera
- Family: Tineidae
- Subfamily: Myrmecozelinae
- Genus: Moerarchis; Durrant, 1914

Synonyms
- Endothetis Meyrick, 1930; Eucricostoma Diakonoff, 1949; Exaxa Diakonoff, 1968; Exoplisis Gozmany, 1976; Oxytinea Diakonoff, 1968; Tanymita Turner, 1923

= Moerarchis =

Genus of moths

Moerarchis is a genus of moths belonging to the family Tineidae.

== Species ==
- Moerarchis anomogramma Meyrick, 1930 (=Exaxa rectilinea Diakonoff, 1968)
- Moerarchis australasiella (Donovan, 1805) (=Tinea cossuna Lewin, 1805)
- Moerarchis clathrata (Felder & Rogenh., 1875) (=Scardia dictyotis Meyrick, 1893)
- Moerarchis galactodelta (Diakonoff, 1968) (from the Philippines)
- Moerarchis hypomacra (Turner, 1923)
- Moerarchis inconcisella (Walker, 1863)
- Moerarchis lanosa (Diakonoff, 1949)
- Moerarchis lapidea Turner, 1927
- Moerarchis placomorpha Meyrick, 1922 (from Australia)
- Moerarchis pyrochroa (Meyrick, 1893) (=Scardia xanthobapta Lower, 1903)
