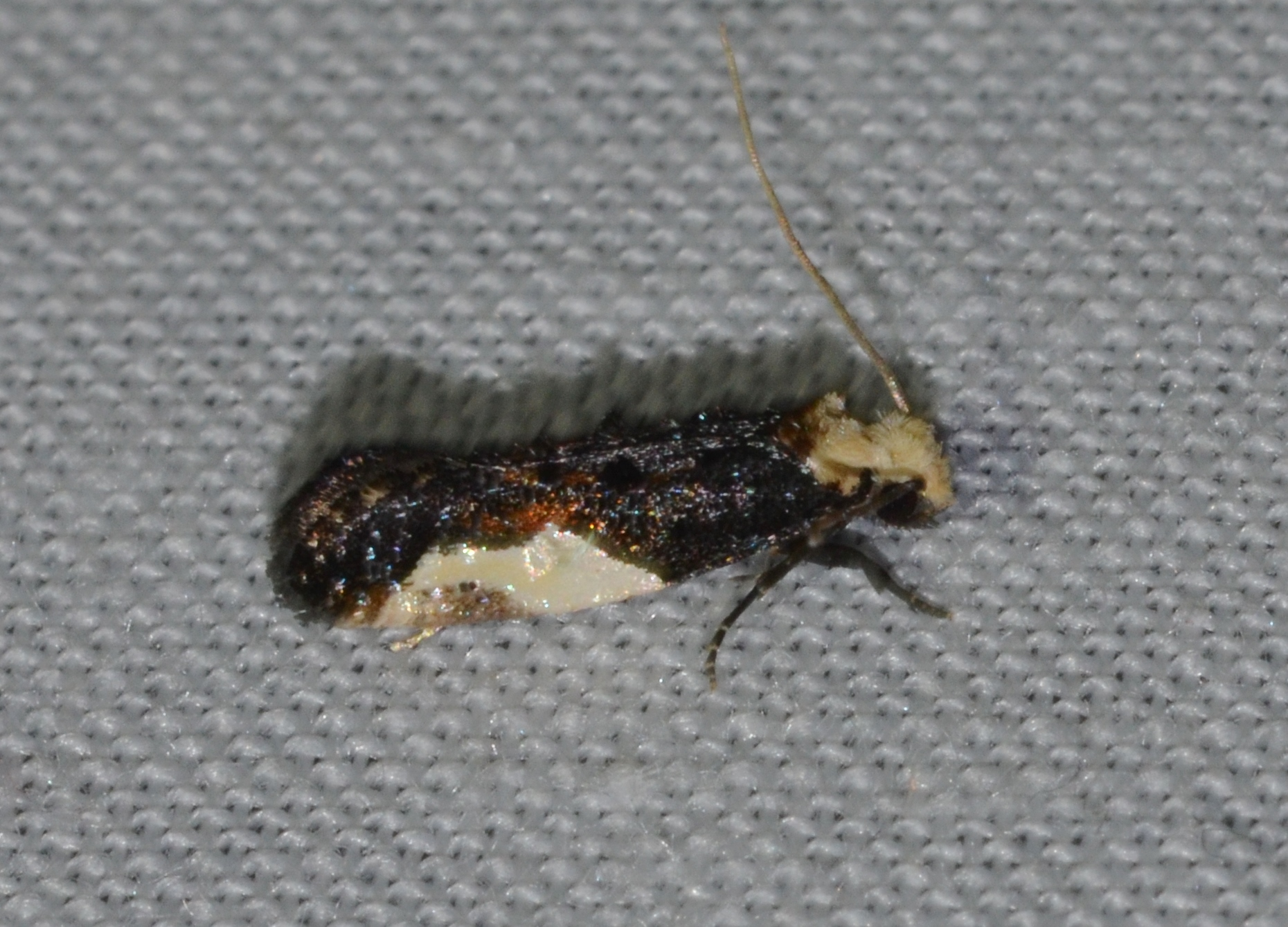

Scientific classification
- Kingdom: Animalia
- Phylum: Arthropoda
- Class: Insecta
- Order: Lepidoptera
- Family: Tineidae
- Genus: Monopis
- Species: M. pavlovskii

Binomial name
- Monopis pavlovskii Zagulajev, 1955

Synonyms
- Monopis Pavlovskii

= Monopis pavlovskii =

Pavlovski's monopis moth

Species of moth

Monopis pavlovskii, or Pavlovski's monopis moth, is a moth of the family Tineidae. It is found in China, Russia, Japan and Korea and is an introduced species in North America, where it has been recorded from New York to central Florida and west to Michigan. Specimens have also been found as far west as Illinois.

The larvae probably feed on detritus.
