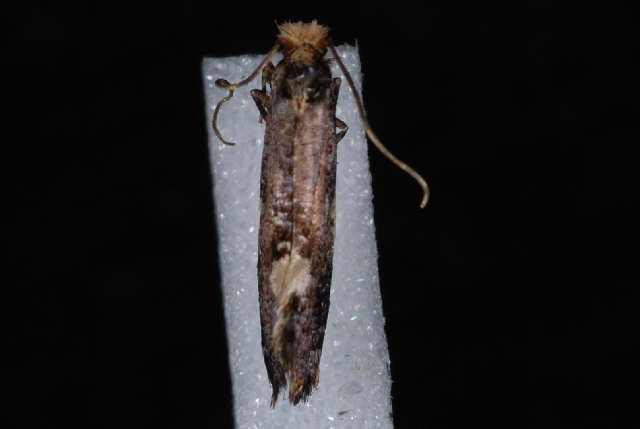

Scientific classification
- Kingdom: Animalia
- Phylum: Arthropoda
- Class: Insecta
- Order: Lepidoptera
- Family: Tineidae
- Genus: Monopis
- Species: M. spilotella

Binomial name
- Monopis spilotella (Tengström, 1848)

Synonyms
- Tinea spilotella Tengström, 1848; Tinea biflavimaculella Clemens, 1860; Monopis biflavimaculella; Monopis halospila Meyrick, 1919; Tinea insignisella Walker, 1863; Monopis isignisella

= Monopis spilotella =

Species of moth

Monopis spilotella is a moth of the family Tineidae. It was described by Johan Martin Jakob von Tengström in 1848. It is found in Scandinavia, Denmark, the Baltic region, Ukraine, and Russia. It is also found in North America.

The wingspan is 10–19 mm. Adults are on wing from May to September.
