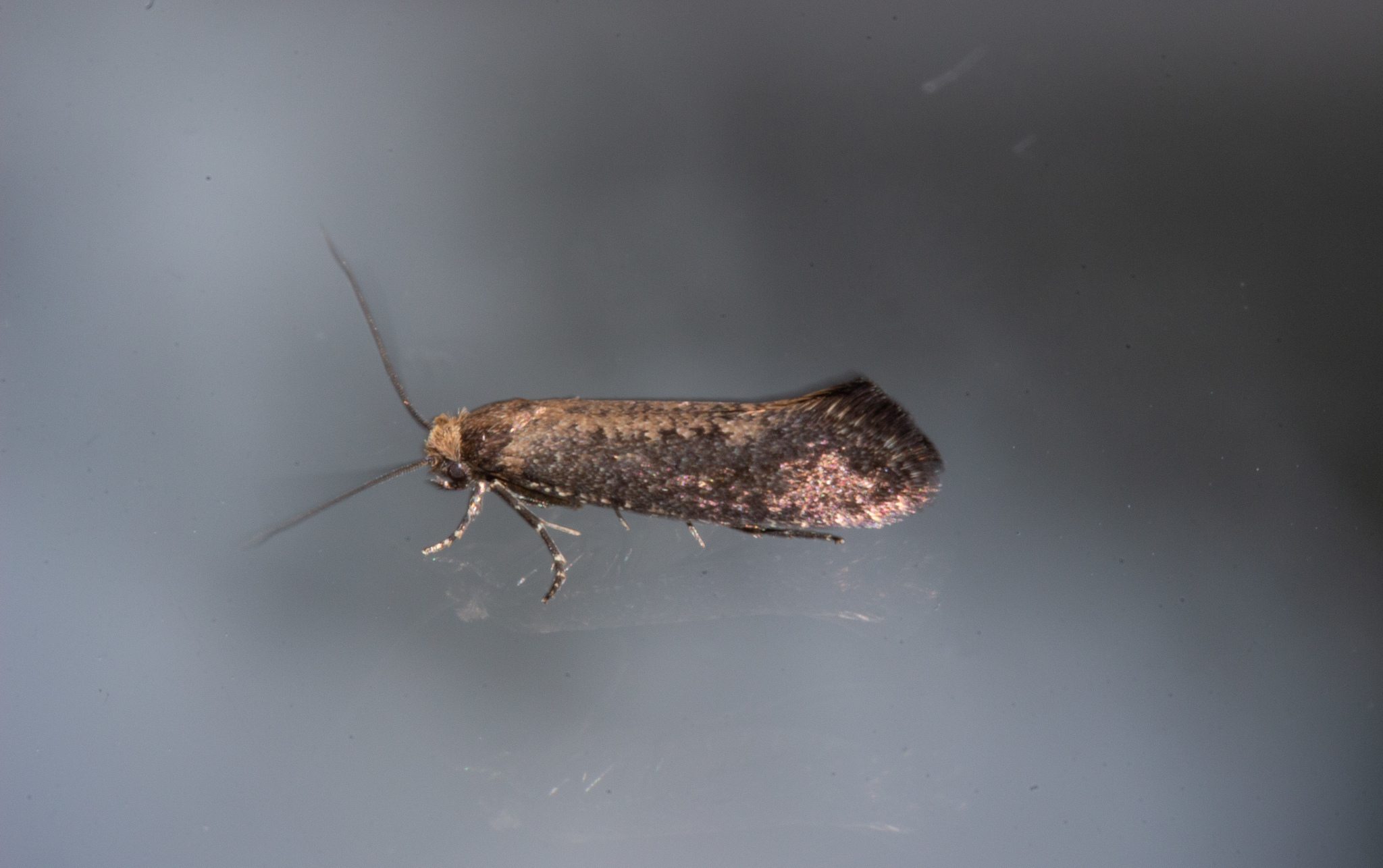
- Monopis ornithias in Dunedin, New Zealand

Scientific classification
- Kingdom: Animalia
- Phylum: Arthropoda
- Clade: Pancrustacea
- Class: Insecta
- Order: Lepidoptera
- Family: Tineidae
- Genus: Monopis
- Species: M. ornithias

Binomial name
- Monopis ornithias (Meyrick, 1888)

Synonyms
- Blabophanes ornithias Meyrick, 1888

= Monopis ornithias =

Species of moth endemic to New Zealand

Monopis ornithias is a species of moth in the family Tineidae. It was first described by Edward Meyrick in 1888. This species is endemic to New Zealand and has been observed in the North and South Islands. The larvae inhabits bird nests and feed on the decaying feathers and nest detritus. Adults have been observed on the wing from September until January. Adults occasionally enter houses. This species is regarded as being poorly known.

== Taxonomy ==
This species was first described by Edward Meyrick using specimens bred from birds nests by Richard William Fereday in Christchurch. Meyrick originally named the moth Blabophanes ornithias. In 1915 Meyrick placed this species in the genus Monopis. In 1927 Alfred Philpott discussed and illustrated the male genitalia of this species. George Hudson discussed and illustrated this species also under the name M. ornithias in his 1928 book The butterflies and moths of New Zealand. In 1971 and again in 1988 John S. Dugdale confirmed the placement of this species in the genus Monopis. The male lectotype is held at the Natural History Museum, London.

M. ornithias, along with other endemic to New Zealand species in the genus Monopis, are regarded as "poorly known and seldom collected".

== Description ==
Illustration by Hudson.

Meyrick described the adult male of this species as follows:

Male. — 10-11 mm. Head light fuscous. Palpi dark fuscous, internally whitish. Antennae, thorax, abdomen, and legs dark fuscous. Forewings elongate, costa gently arched, apex round-pointed, hindmargin extremely obliquely rounded ; veins 6 and 7 stalked ; rather dark fuscous, somewhat irrorated with paler ; an obscure, cloudy, very irregular-edged whitish-ochreous streak near inner margin from base nearly to anal angle ; discal spot only indicated on lower surface, not transparent : cilia rather dark fuscous. Hindwings rather dark fuscous; cilia fuscous.

== Distribution ==
This species is endemic to New Zealand. It has been observed in both the North and South Islands.

== Habitat and hosts ==
The larva inhabits bird nests feeding on decaying feathers and nest detritus.

== Behaviour ==
Adults have been observed on the wing from September until January. Adults occasionally enter houses.
