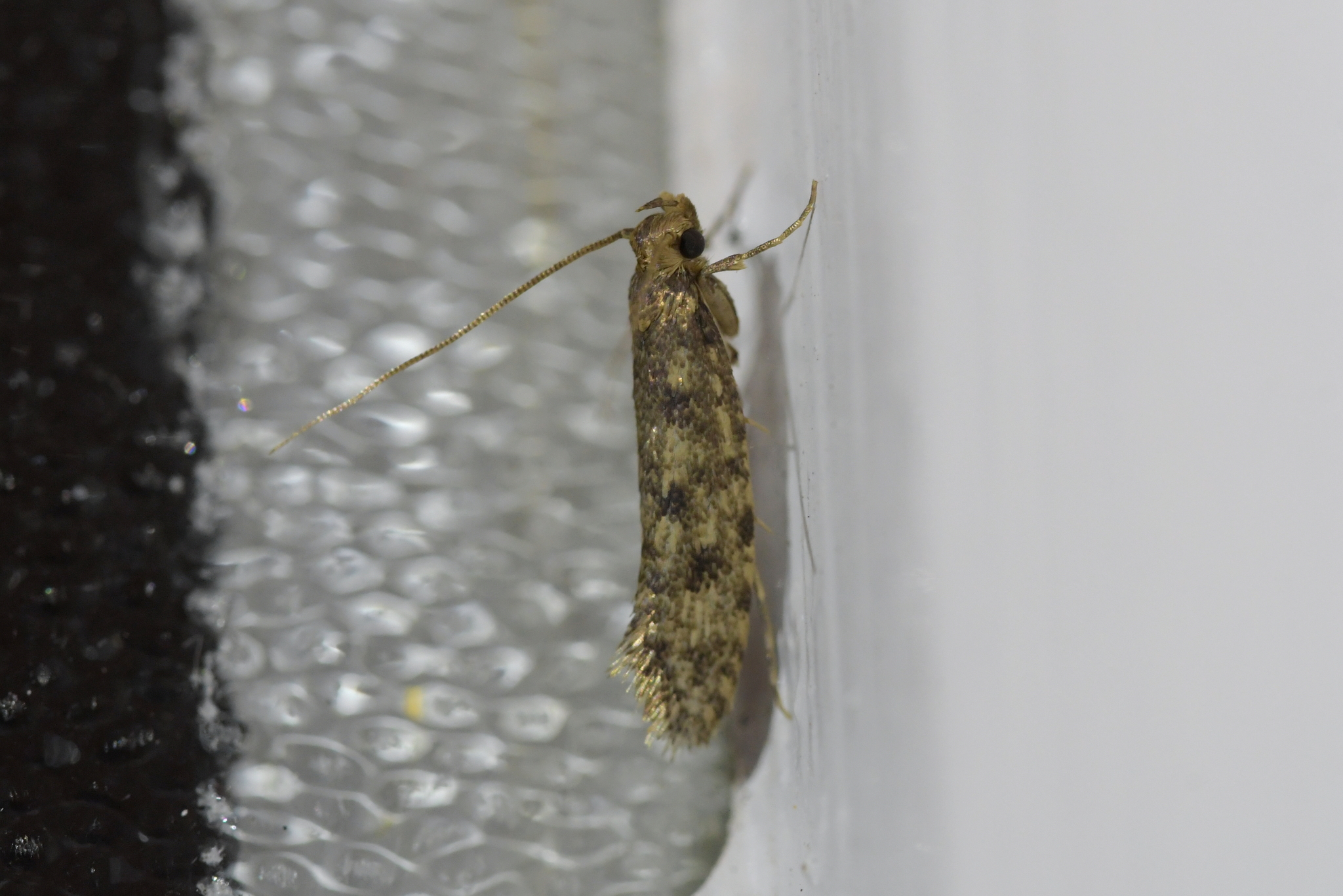
- Lindera tessellatella

Scientific classification
- Kingdom: Animalia
- Phylum: Arthropoda
- Clade: Pancrustacea
- Class: Insecta
- Order: Lepidoptera
- Family: Tineidae
- Subfamily: Setomorphinae
- Genus: Lindera; Blanchard, 1852

= Lindera (moth) =

Genus of moths

Lindera is a genus of moths in the family Tineidae. It was described by Émile Blanchard in 1852.

Species:

- Lindera baliopa Meyrick, 1917
- Lindera onychias Meyrick, 1931
- Lindera tessellatella Blanchard, 1852
- Lindera venezuelensis (Amsel, 1956)
