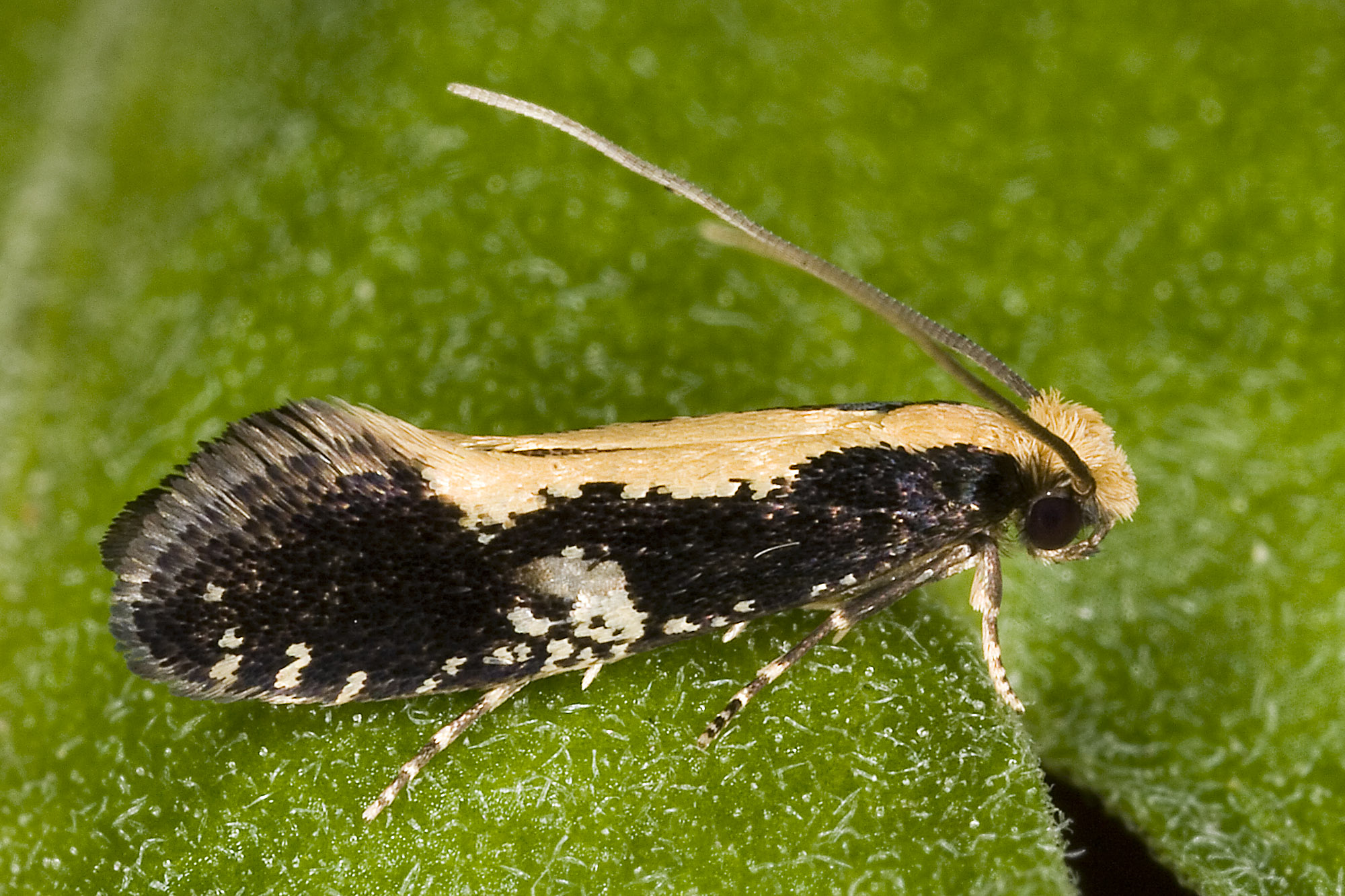
- Adult in Dresden, Germany
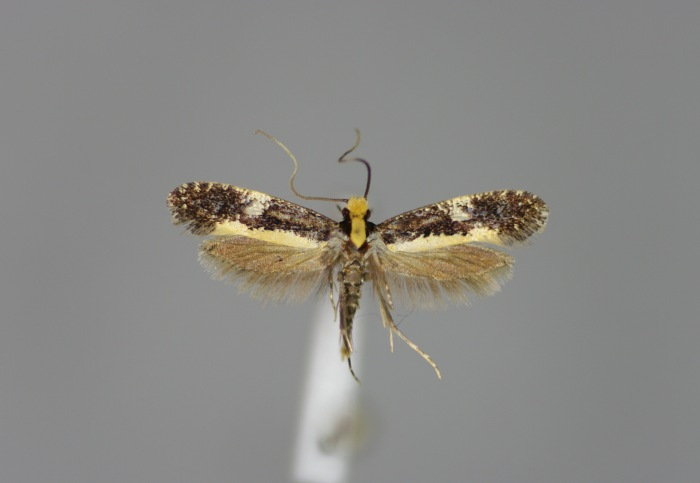

Scientific classification
- Kingdom: Animalia
- Phylum: Arthropoda
- Clade: Pancrustacea
- Class: Insecta
- Order: Lepidoptera
- Family: Tineidae
- Genus: Monopis
- Species: M. obviella

Binomial name
- Monopis obviella (Denis & Schiffermüller, 1775)

Synonyms
- Several, see text

= Monopis obviella =

Species of moth

Monopis obviella is a species of tineoid moth. It belongs to the fungus moth family (Tineidae), and therein to the nominate subfamily Tineinae. It is (under the invalid name Tinea ferruginella) the type species of Blabophanes, today treated as a junior synonym of the genus Monopis. M. crocicapitella was only separated from the present species in 1859, and is still frequently confused with it even by rather recent sources.

== Ecology and description ==
It is not uncommon all across western Palearctic; while it has not been recorded in Slovenia yet, given that it occurs in all neighboring countries it probably has simply been overlooked. But it is apparently still a rather Continental species, as it seems absent from major Mediterranean islands and Iceland, and on Great Britain occurs mainly in the south, towards the English Channel. But confusion with M. crocicapitella makes the exact range of these moths still quite little known.

The adults of this small moth have a wingspan of 13–20 mm. On the wing around May to October (depending on the location), they are nocturnal but may fly around in daytime or be attracted to light occasionally. They have blackish forewings with a thick creamy-white trailing edge, some sprinkles of the same color along the leading edge, and the translucent center spot characteristic for the genus Monopis. The hindwings are a lighter greyish brown with minute black speckles; they are surrounded by a long-haired fringe, as usual for fungus moths and relatives. The body is dark brown, and the head bears a tuft of creamy-brown hair. This species can easily be mistaken for Monopis crocicapitella due to almost indistinguishable markings.

In most of its range, two generations per year seem to occur. The caterpillar larvae eat detritus. They have been recorded from bird of prey pellets, horn shavings, wool (particularly if left outside to decay) and rotting wood.

== Synonyms ==
Invalid scientific names (junior synonyms and others) of M. obviella are:

- Blabophanes ferruginella (Hübner, [1813]) (non Thunberg, 1788: preoccupied)
- Monopis ferruginella (Hübner, [1813]) (non Thunberg, 1788: preoccupied)
- Tinea ferruginella Hübner, [1813] (non Thunberg, 1788: preoccupied)
- Tinea obviella Denis & Schiffermüller, 1775
- Tinea splendella Hübner 1813
- Tinea ustella Haworth, 1828
