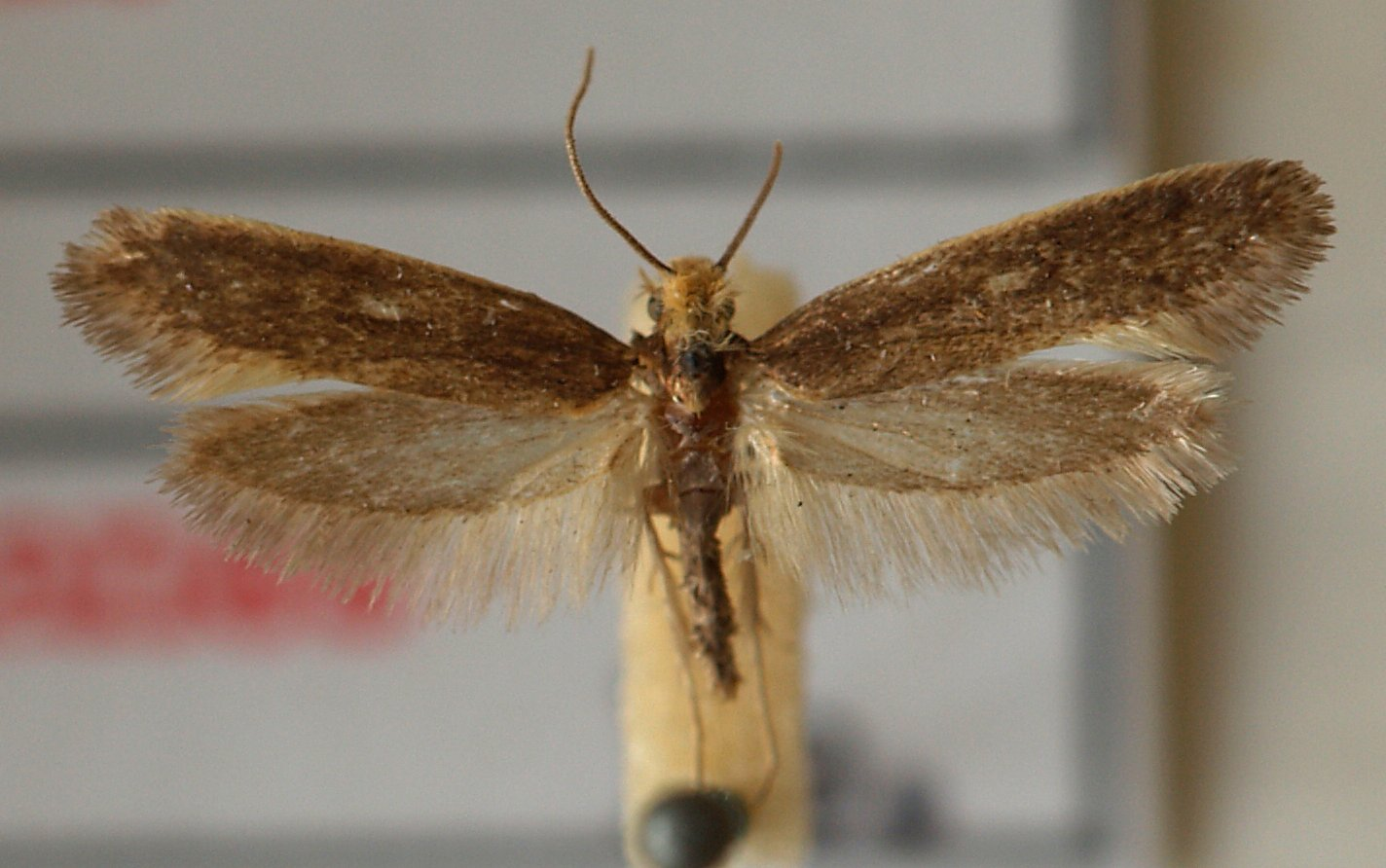

Scientific classification
- Kingdom: Animalia
- Phylum: Arthropoda
- Clade: Pancrustacea
- Class: Insecta
- Order: Lepidoptera
- Family: Tineidae
- Genus: Monopis
- Species: M. imella

Binomial name
- Monopis imella (Hübner, [1813])

Synonyms
- Blabophanes imella

= Monopis imella =

Species of moth

Monopis imella is a moth of the family Tineidae found in Europe.

The wingspan is 11–15 mm.

Originally discovered in Britain around 1858, the Monopis Imella is an indistinctive species that has a yellowish bunch of scales located on the head, and a white line across its costa. There can sometimes be a pale spot on the forewing but usually the forewing looks plain. The larvae of the moth feed on animal and plant remains, particularly feathers, hair and fur.

The Adulthood stage occurs between June–September, possibly in two different generations. This species has a large distribution across the British Isles, but overall is mostly uncommon Compared to other species it is nationally scarce, but most commonly found near the sea along in more wild habits compared to other British species of the same genus.

Location: Found in Europe, mostly scattered across the British Isles. Very scarce, extremely rare.
