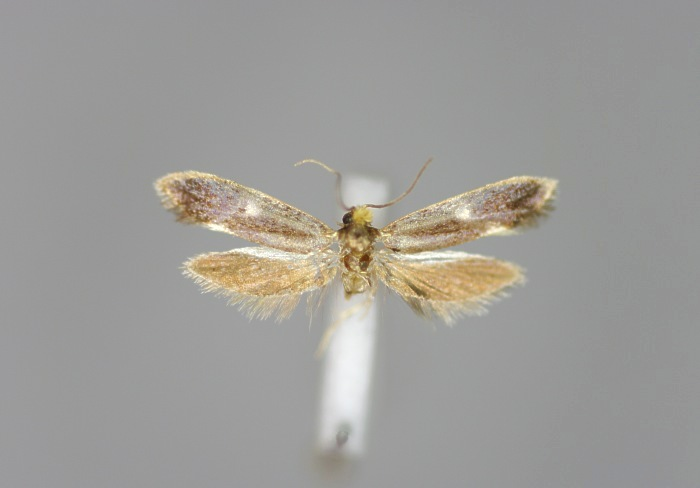

Scientific classification
- Kingdom: Animalia
- Phylum: Arthropoda
- Class: Insecta
- Order: Lepidoptera
- Family: Tineidae
- Genus: Monopis
- Species: M. burmanni

Binomial name
- Monopis burmanni Petersen, 1979

Synonyms
- Monopis bisonella Šumpich, 2011

= Monopis burmanni =

Species of moth

Monopis burmanni is a moth of the family Tineidae. It is found in Austria, Poland and Russia (Ural).
