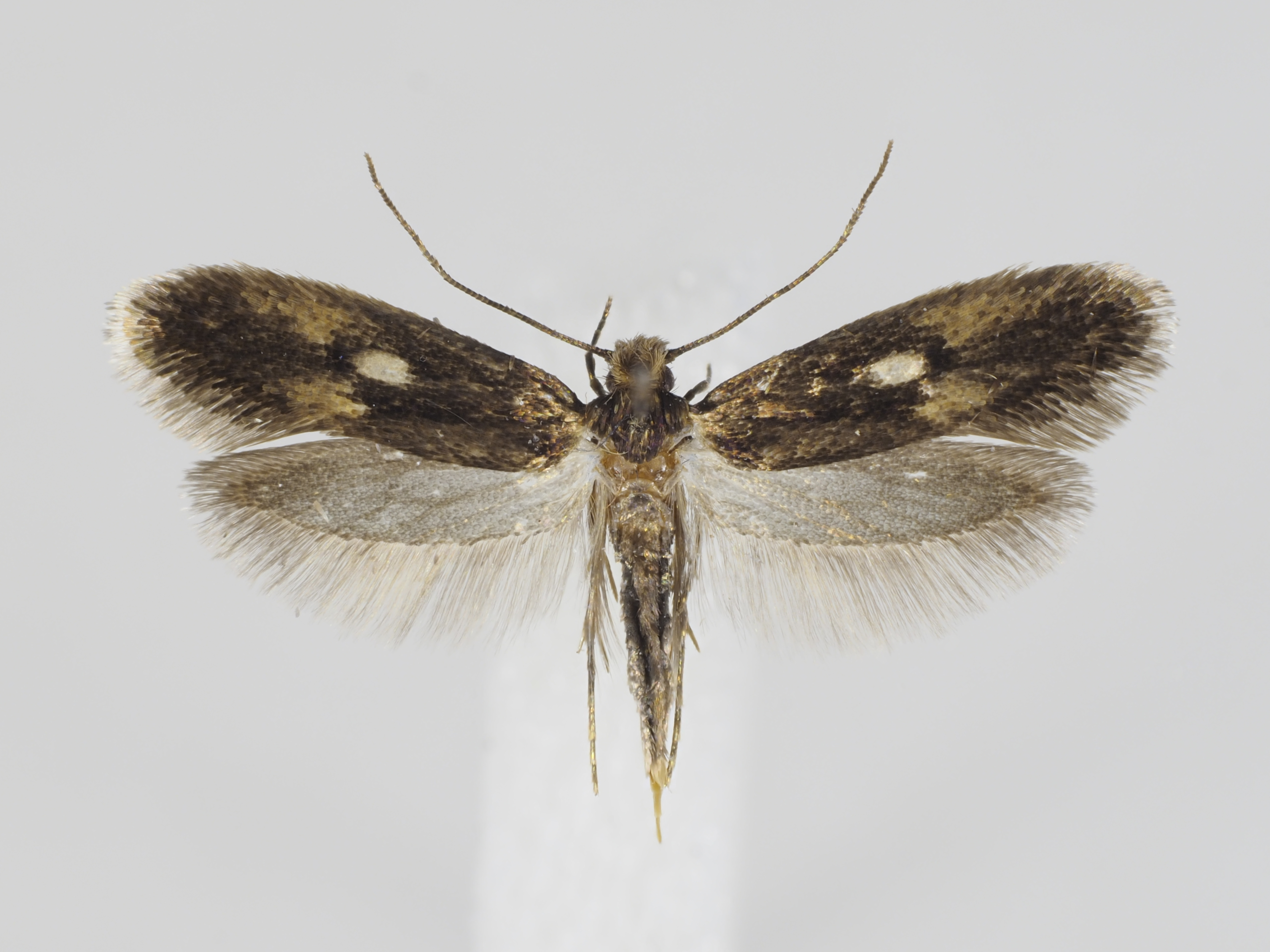

Scientific classification
- Kingdom: Animalia
- Phylum: Arthropoda
- Clade: Pancrustacea
- Class: Insecta
- Order: Lepidoptera
- Family: Tineidae
- Genus: Monopis
- Species: M. fenestratella

Binomial name
- Monopis fenestratella (Heyden, 1863)

= Monopis fenestratella =

Species of moth

Monopis fenestratella is a moth belonging to the family Tineidae. The species was first described by Carl von Heyden in 1863.

It is native to Europe.
