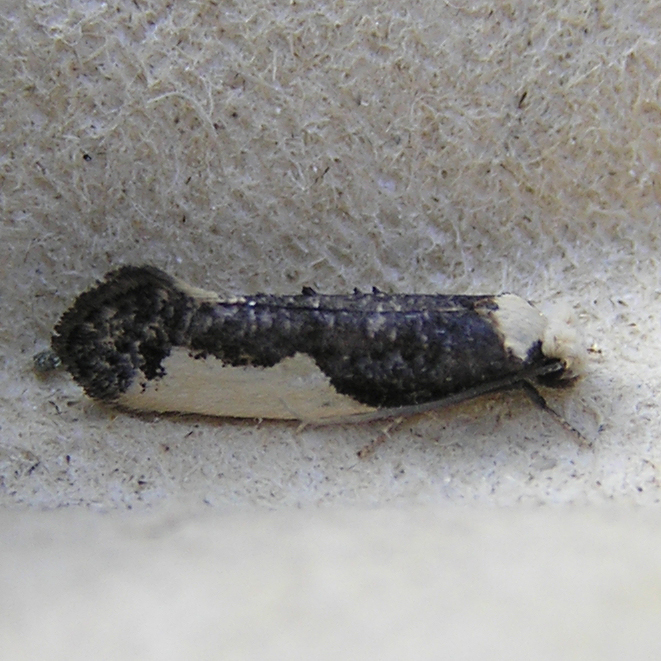

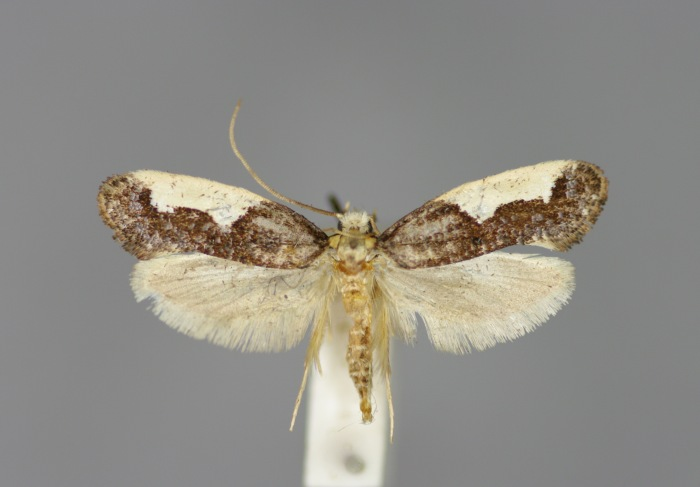

Scientific classification
- Kingdom: Animalia
- Phylum: Arthropoda
- Clade: Pancrustacea
- Class: Insecta
- Order: Lepidoptera
- Family: Tineidae
- Genus: Monopis
- Species: M. monachella

Binomial name
- Monopis monachella (Hübner, 1796)

Synonyms
- Tinea monachella Hubner, 1796; Alucita mediella Fabricius, 1794

= Monopis monachella =

Species of moth

Monopis monachella is a moth of the family Tineidae. It is widespread in Eurasia, Africa, India, Sri Lanka, Burma, Sumatra, Java, the Philippines, Taiwan, Japan, New Guinea, Samoa, North America and South America.

The wingspan is 12–20 mm. The moth flies from April to September.

The larvae feed on animal remains.
