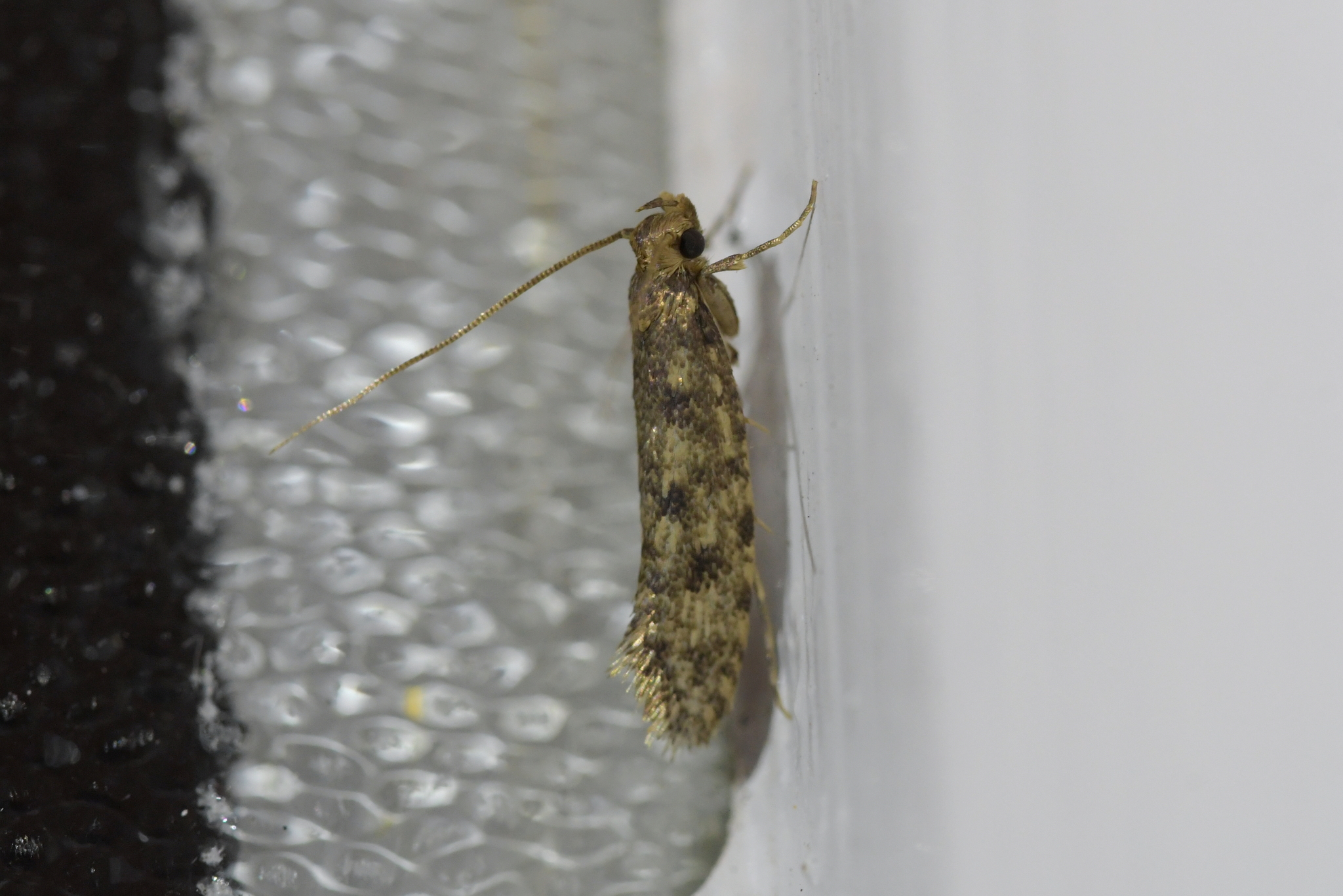

Scientific classification
- Kingdom: Animalia
- Phylum: Arthropoda
- Clade: Pancrustacea
- Class: Insecta
- Order: Lepidoptera
- Family: Tineidae
- Genus: Lindera
- Species: L. tessellatella

Binomial name
- Lindera tessellatella Blanchard, 1852

Synonyms
- Safra bogotatella Walker, 1864; Setomorpha calcularis Meyrick, 1906; Paraneura cruciferella Dietz, 1905; Paraneura ehrhornella Dietz, 1905; Paraneura simulella Dietz, 1905; Palpula variegella Blanchard, 1852

= Lindera tessellatella =

Species of moth

Lindera tessellatella is a species of moth in the family Tineidae described by Émile Blanchard in 1852. It is a widely distributed species, which was first described from South America, but has been recorded from Africa, Europe, North America, Australia, New Zealand, Fiji and Hawaii.

The wingspan is 20–30 mm.
