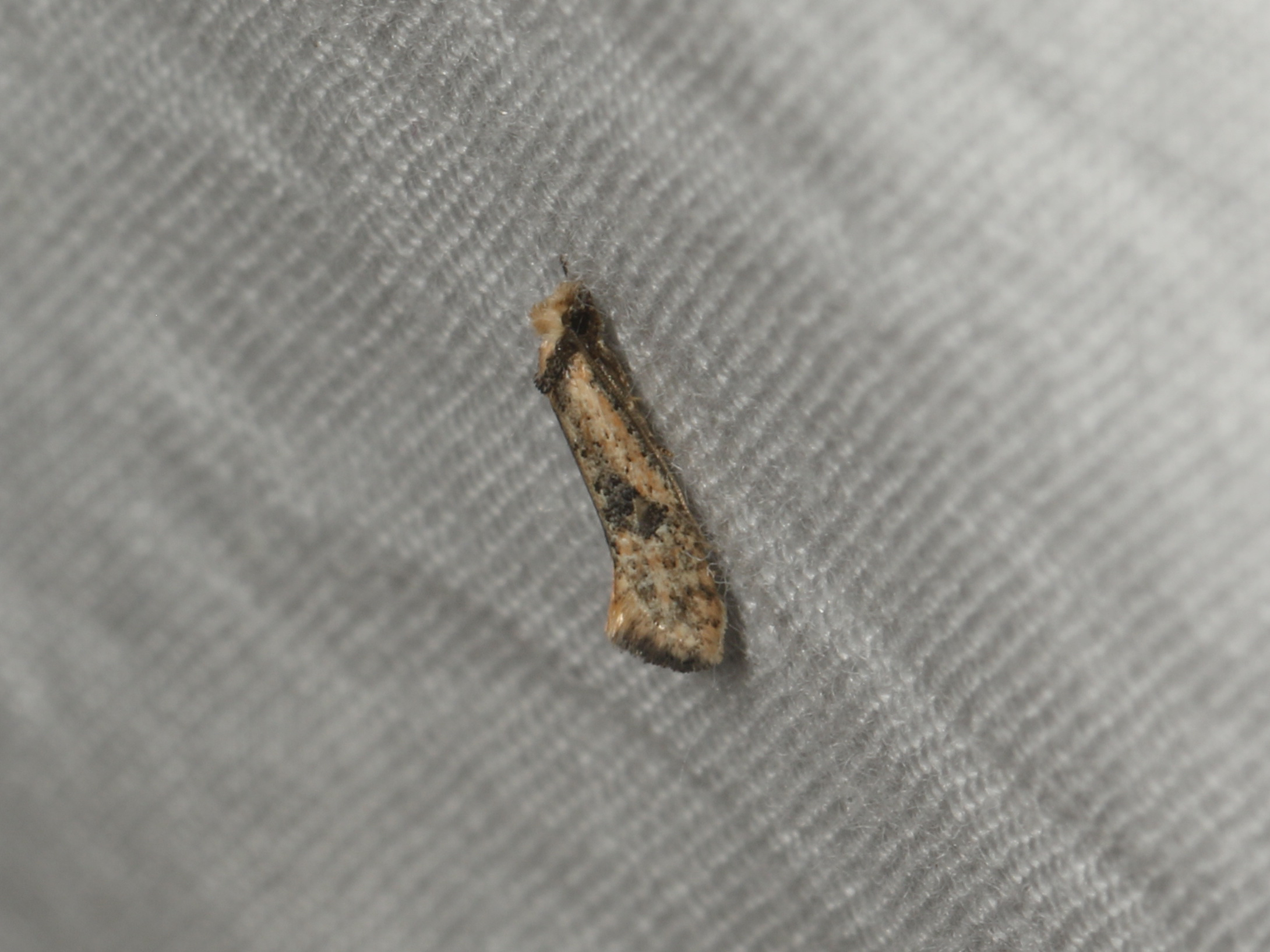

Scientific classification
- Kingdom: Animalia
- Phylum: Arthropoda
- Class: Insecta
- Order: Lepidoptera
- Family: Tineidae
- Genus: Monopis
- Species: M. argillacea

Binomial name
- Monopis argillacea (Meyrick, 1893)

Synonyms
- Blabophanes argillacea Meyrick, 1893

= Monopis argillacea =

Species of moth

Monopis argillacea is a moth of the family Tineidae first described by Edward Meyrick in 1893. It is found in Australia and New Zealand.
