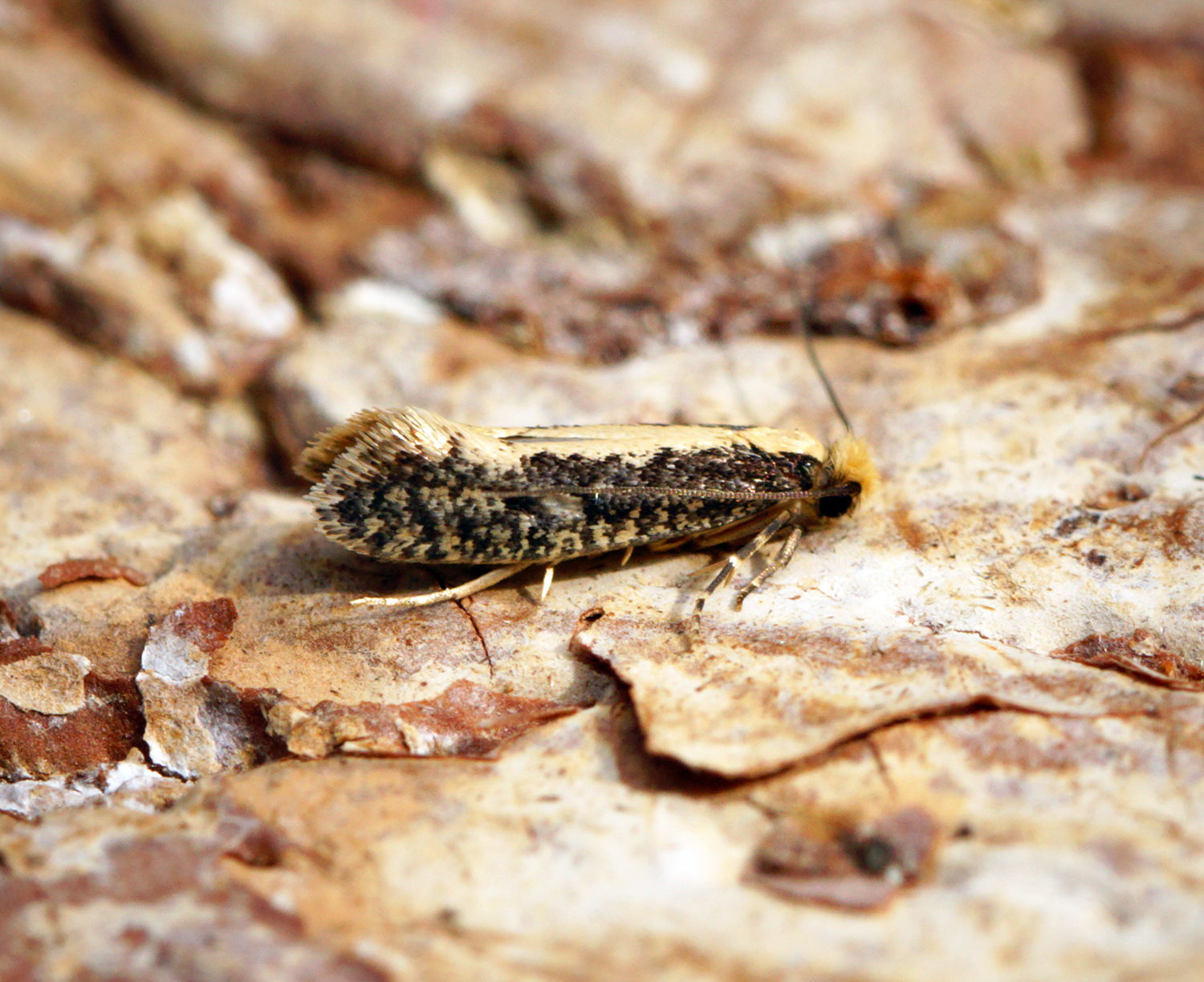

Scientific classification
- Kingdom: Animalia
- Phylum: Arthropoda
- Class: Insecta
- Order: Lepidoptera
- Family: Tineidae
- Genus: Monopis
- Species: M. crocicapitella

Binomial name
- Monopis crocicapitella (Clemens, 1859)

Synonyms
- Tinea crocicapitella Clemens, 1859; Tinea amandatella Walker, 1863; Monopis cecconii Turati, 1919; Monopis dobrogica Georgesco, 1964; Blabophanes heringi Richardson, 1893; Tinea hyalinella Staudinger, 1870; Blabophanes lombardica Hering, 1889; Amydria prometopias Gyen, 1913; Blabophanes ptilophaga Enderlein, 1909

= Monopis crocicapitella =

Species of moth

Monopis crocicapitella, the pale-backed clothes moth, or the bird-nest moth, is a moth of the family Tineidae described by James Brackenridge Clemens in 1859. It has a nearly cosmopolitan distribution. It was first described from the eastern United States.

The wingspan is 10–16 mm.

In western Europe, adults are on wing from June to October.

This species can easily be mistaken for Monopis obviella due to almost indistinguishable markings.

The capability of this species to infest human dwellings is unknown. Larvae of this species were found to not survive at 51% relative humidity, thriving at 93% relative humidity.

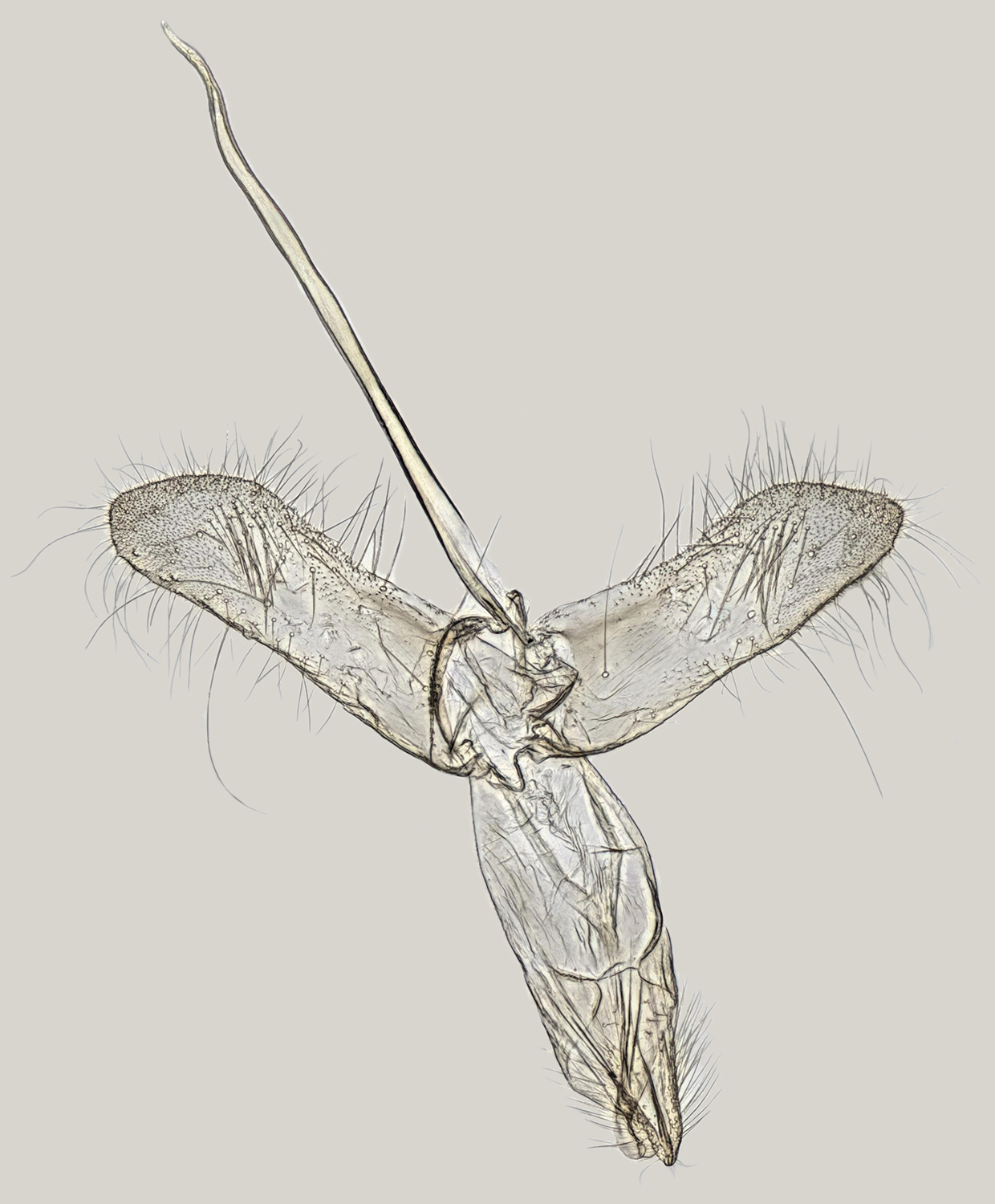
Male genitalia of Monopis crocicapitella. See the image description for characters separating M. crocicapitella from Monopis obviella.
