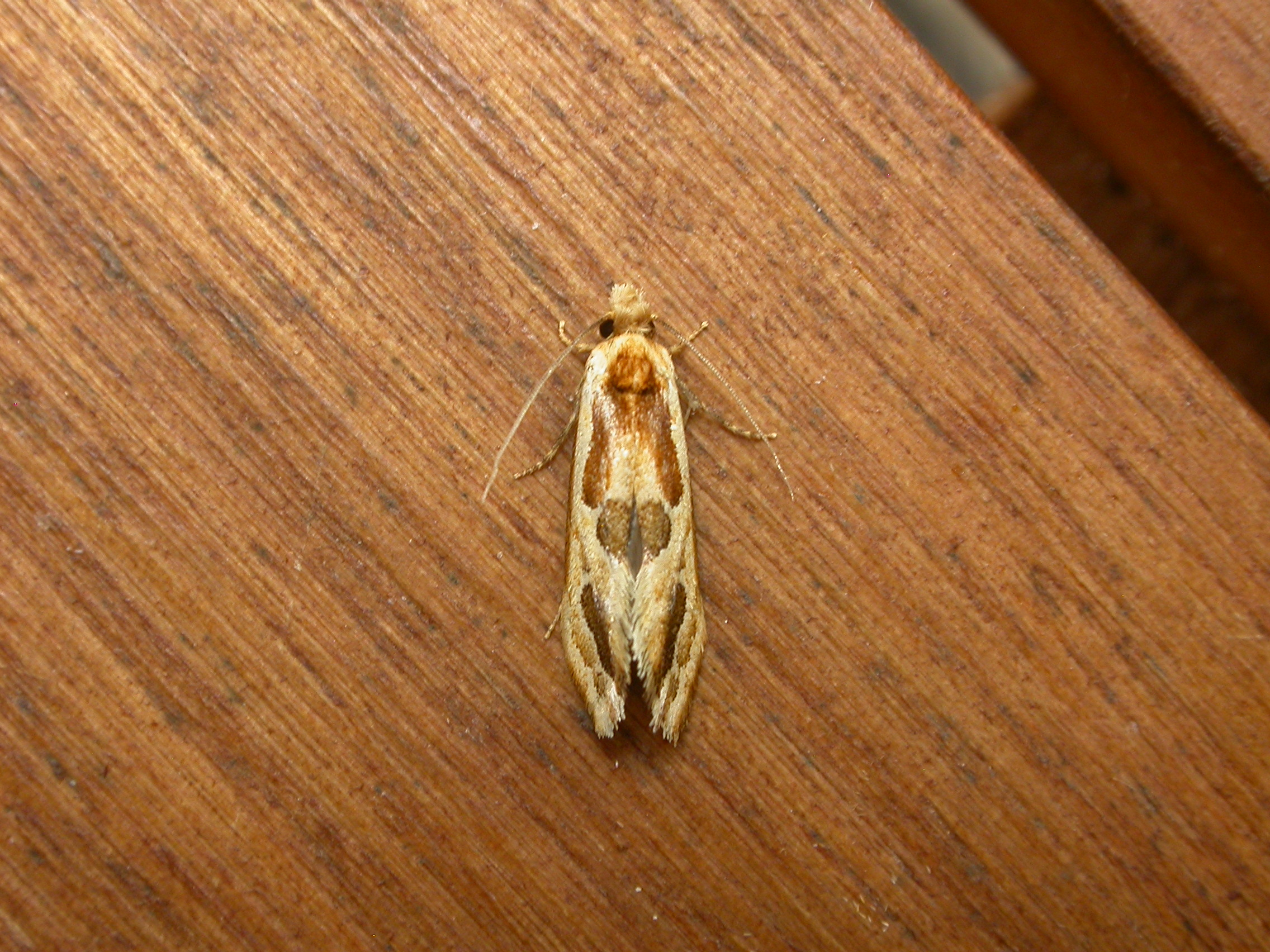

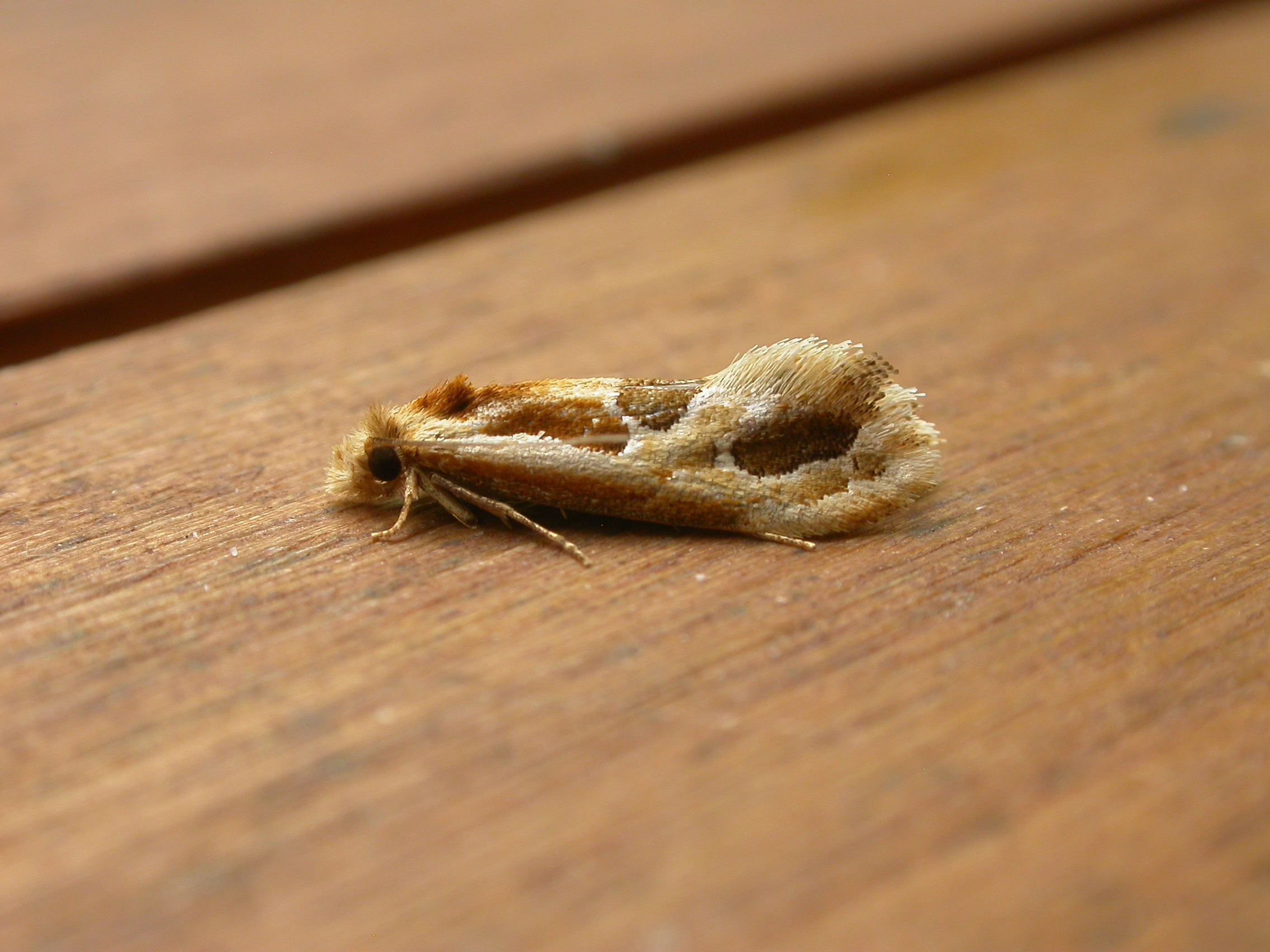

Scientific classification
- Kingdom: Animalia
- Phylum: Arthropoda
- Class: Insecta
- Order: Lepidoptera
- Family: Tineidae
- Genus: Moerarchis
- Species: M. placomorpha

Binomial name
- Moerarchis placomorpha Meyrick, 1922

= Moerarchis placomorpha =

Species of moth

Moerarchis placomorpha is a species of moth of the family Tineidae. It is found in Australia (including Queensland).
