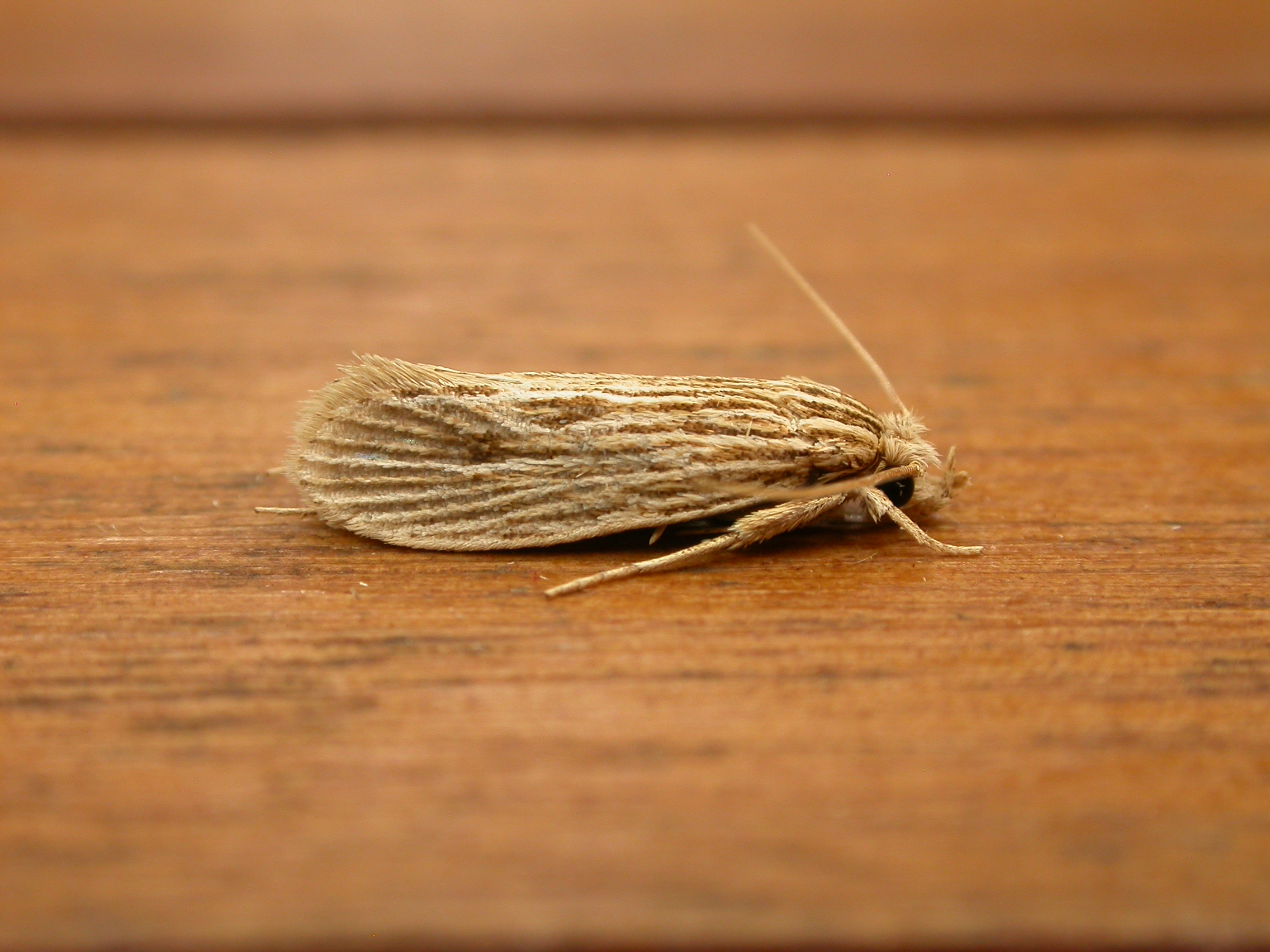

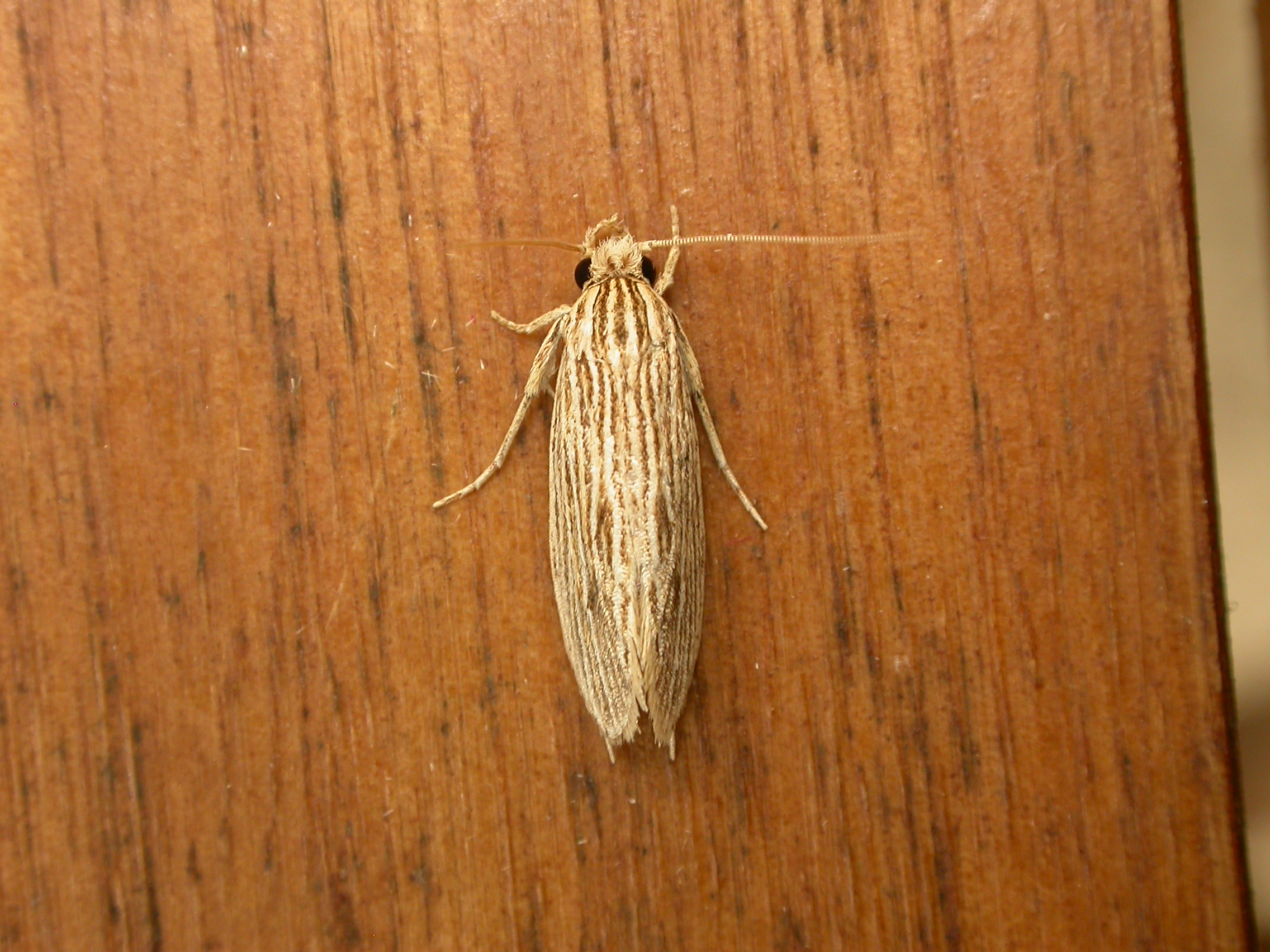

Scientific classification
- Domain: Eukaryota
- Kingdom: Animalia
- Phylum: Arthropoda
- Class: Insecta
- Order: Lepidoptera
- Family: Tineidae
- Genus: Moerarchis
- Species: M. hypomacra

Binomial name
- Moerarchis hypomacra (Turner, 1923)

Synonyms
- Tanymita hypomacra Turner, 1923

= Moerarchis hypomacra =

Species of moth

Moerarchis hypomacra is a species of moth of the family Tineidae. It is found in Australia (including Queensland).
