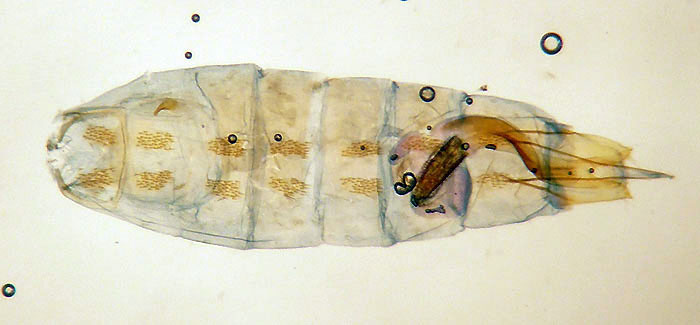
- Female abdomen

Scientific classification
- Kingdom: Animalia
- Phylum: Arthropoda
- Class: Insecta
- Order: Lepidoptera
- Family: Coleophoridae
- Genus: Coleophora
- Species: C. vestianella

Binomial name
- Coleophora vestianella (Linnaeus, 1758)

= Coleophora vestianella =

Species of moth

Coleophora vestianella is a moth of the family Coleophoridae. It is found from Europe to Asia Minor, Iran, Afghanistan, China, the Korean Peninsula and Japan.

The wingspan is 11–16 mm (0.43–0.63 in). Adults are on wing from June to August.

The larvae feed on Chenopodium (including Chenopodium album) and Atriplex species (including Atriplex patula). They feed on the generative organs of their host plant.

== Synonyms ==
- Coleophora annulatella Nylander, 1848
- Coleophora botauripennella Toll, 1955
- Coleophora laripennella Toll, 1953
- Coleophora subtractella Caradja, 1920
- Coleophora tengstromella Doubleday, 1859
- Ecebalia vestianella (Linnaeus, 1758)
- Phalaena (Tinea) vestianella Linnaeus, 1758
- Ornix laripennella Zetterstedt, 1839
