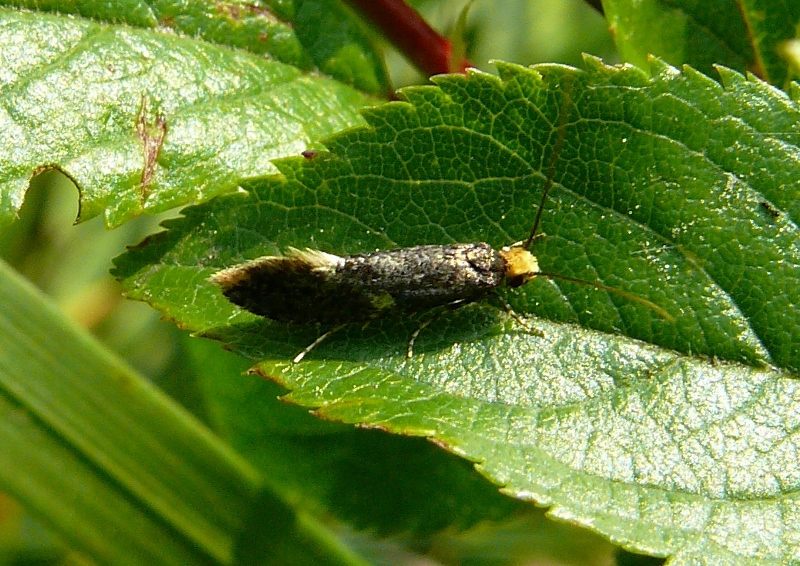

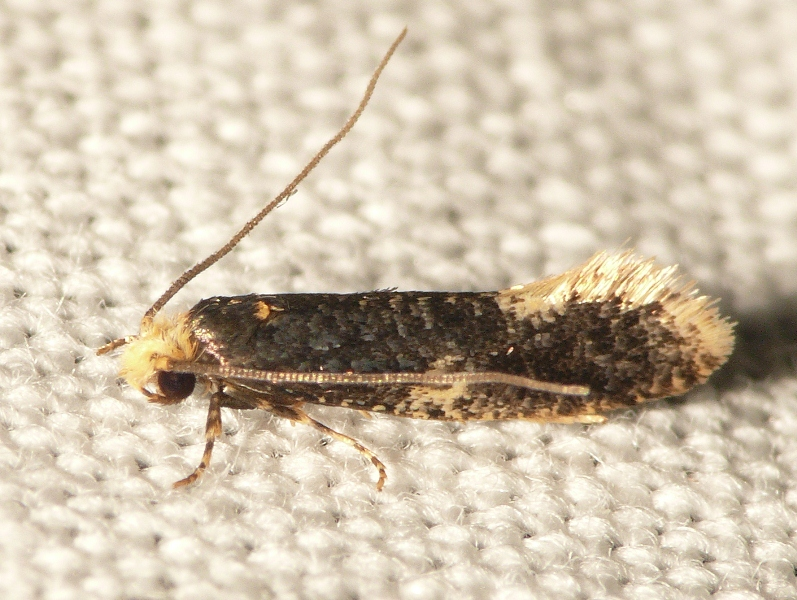

Scientific classification
- Kingdom: Animalia
- Phylum: Arthropoda
- Class: Insecta
- Order: Lepidoptera
- Family: Tineidae
- Genus: Monopis
- Species: M. weaverella

Binomial name
- Monopis weaverella (Scott, 1858)

Synonyms
- Tinea weaverella Scott, 1858; Monopis nigripilella Réal, 1989

= Monopis weaverella =

Species of moth

Monopis weaverella is a species of moth in the family Tineidae. It is found in most of Europe and North America.

The wingspan is 13–18 mm. Adults are on wing from May to August.

The larvae are scavengers on animal carcasses and faeces.
