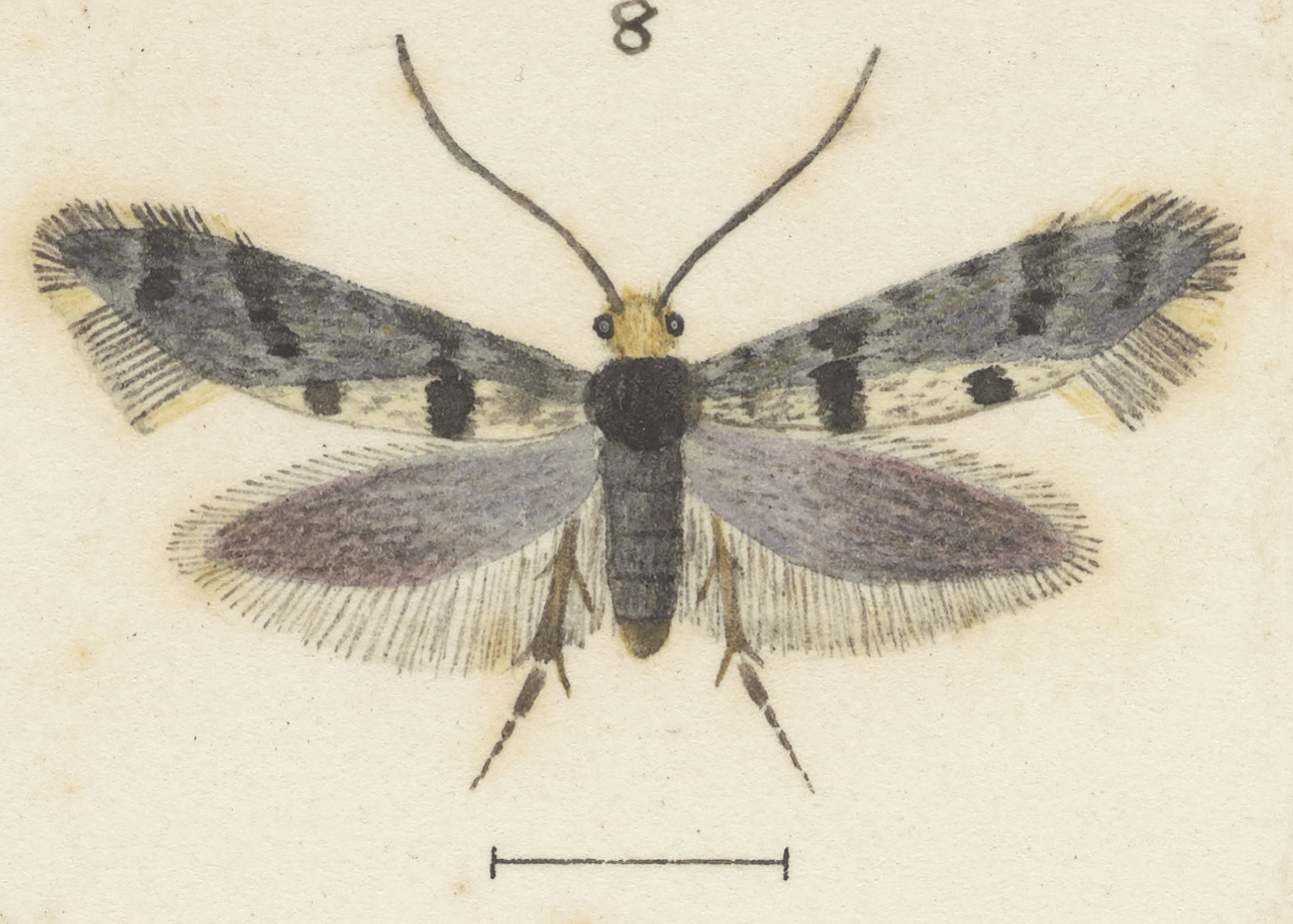
- female

Scientific classification
- Kingdom: Animalia
- Phylum: Arthropoda
- Class: Insecta
- Order: Lepidoptera
- Family: Tineidae
- Genus: Tinea
- Species: T. dicharacta

Binomial name
- Tinea dicharacta Meyrick, 1893

= Tinea dicharacta =

Species of moth

Tinea dicharacta is a species of moth in the family Tineidae. This species was first described by Edward Meyrick in 1893 and can be found in Australia. However, in 1911 Meyrick discussed specimens of an endemic-to-New-Zealand moth, but placed it within this species. The taxonomy of this latter moth, although currently falling within this species, is regarded as being in need of revision. As such the moth discussed by Edward Meyrick in 1911 is also known as Tinea dicharacta sensu Meyrick, 1911 or Tinea (s.l.) dicharacta.
