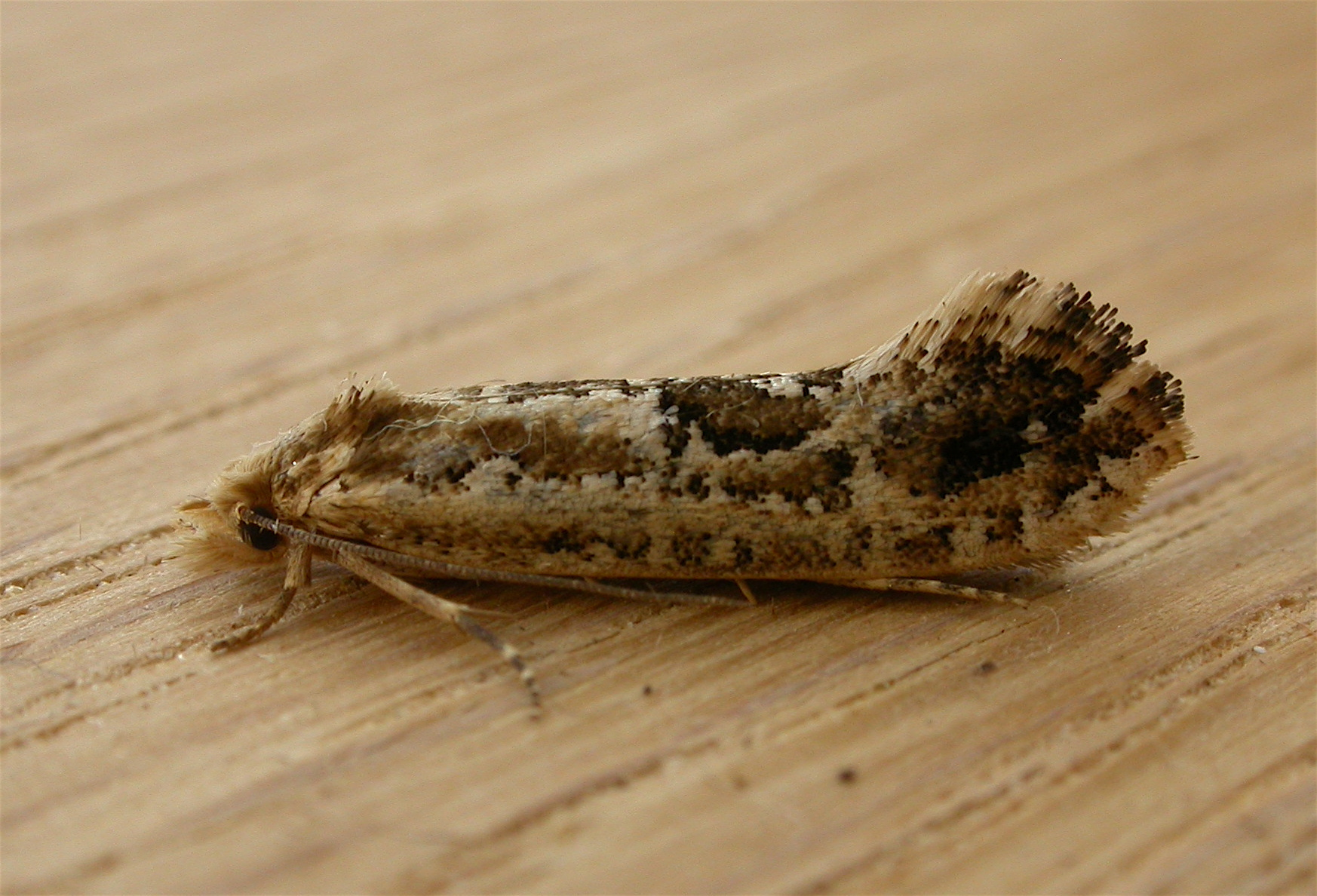

Scientific classification
- Kingdom: Animalia
- Phylum: Arthropoda
- Clade: Pancrustacea
- Class: Insecta
- Order: Lepidoptera
- Family: Tineidae
- Genus: Moerarchis
- Species: M. inconcisella

Binomial name
- Moerarchis inconcisella (Walker, 1863)

Synonyms
- Tinea inconcisella Walker, 1863

= Moerarchis inconcisella =

Species of moth

Moerarchis inconcisella is a moth of the family Tineidae. It is found in eastern Australia.

The wingspan is about 20 mm. The larvae feed on the bark or wood of the rotting logs they live in.
