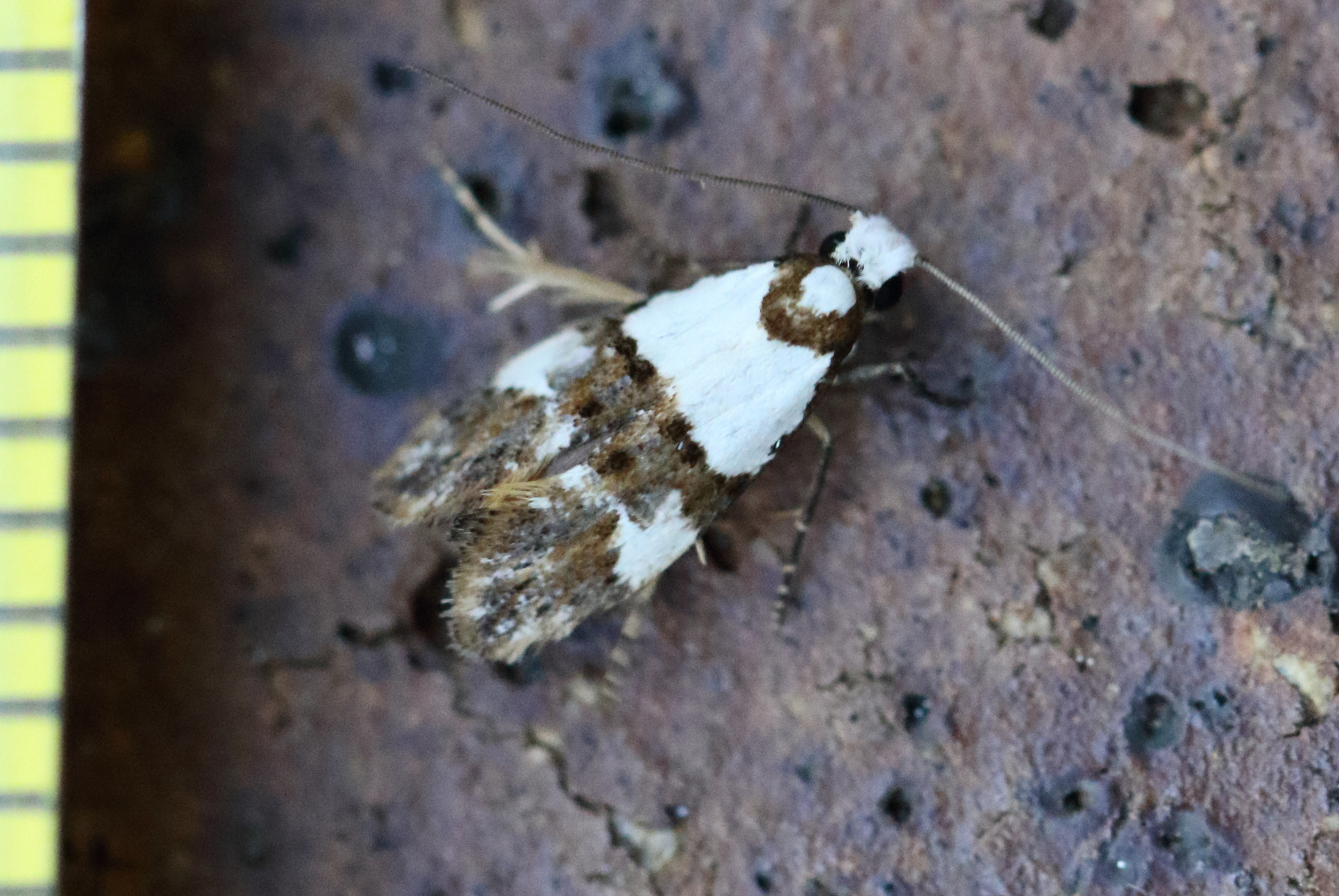

Scientific classification
- Kingdom: Animalia
- Phylum: Arthropoda
- Class: Insecta
- Order: Lepidoptera
- Family: Tineidae
- Genus: Monopis
- Species: M. meliorella

Binomial name
- Monopis meliorella (Walker, 1863)

Synonyms
- Tinea meliorella Walker, 1863; Tinea oecophoroides Walker, 1864; Blabophanes insularis Felder and Rogenhofer, 1875; Blabophanes meliorella

= Monopis meliorella =

Blotched monopis moth

Species of moth

Monopis meliorella, the blotched monopis moth, is a moth of the family Tineidae. It was first described by Francis Walker in 1863. It has been recorded from Australia (including Norfolk Island) and Hawaii.

The larvae probably feed on animal fibre or refuse of plant origin.
