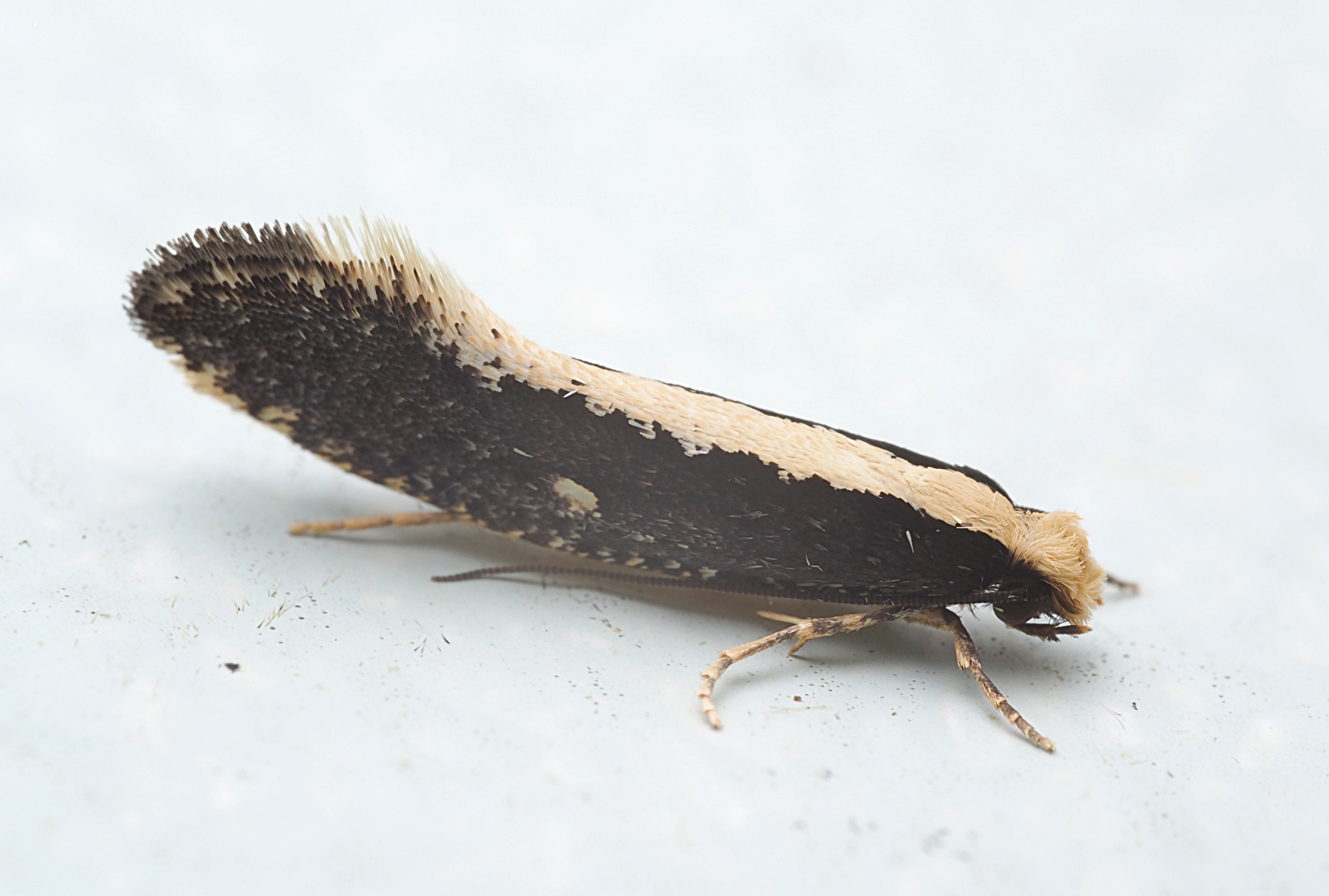

Scientific classification
- Kingdom: Animalia
- Phylum: Arthropoda
- Class: Insecta
- Order: Lepidoptera
- Family: Tineidae
- Genus: Monopis
- Species: M. ethelella

Binomial name
- Monopis ethelella (Newman, 1856)

Synonyms
- Tinea ethelella Newman, 1856

= Monopis ethelella =

Species of moth

Monopis ethelella is a moth of the family Tineidae first described by Edward Newman in 1856. It is found in Australia and New Zealand.
