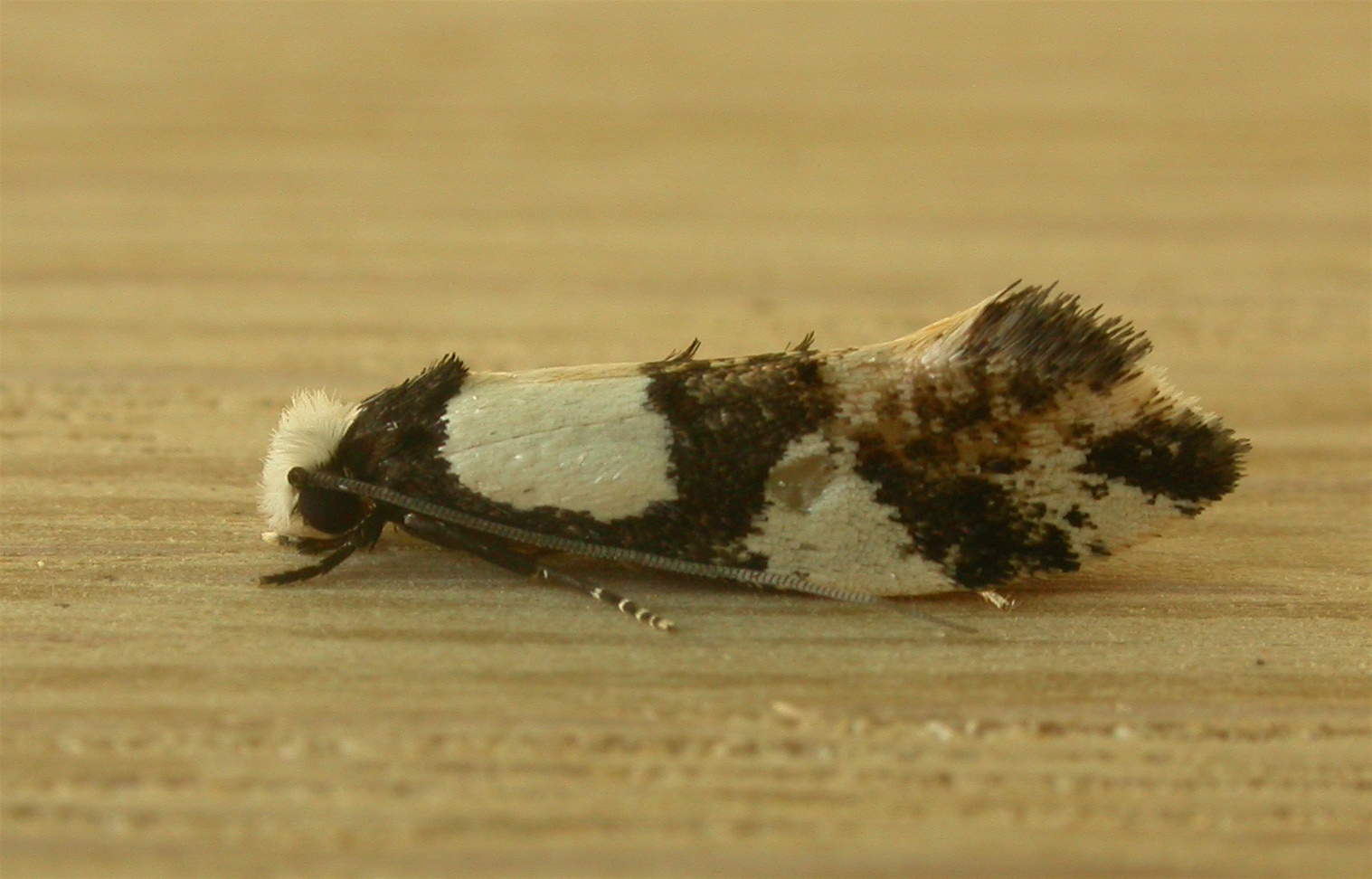

Scientific classification
- Kingdom: Animalia
- Phylum: Arthropoda
- Clade: Pancrustacea
- Class: Insecta
- Order: Lepidoptera
- Family: Tineidae
- Genus: Monopis
- Species: M. icterogastra

Binomial name
- Monopis icterogastra (Zeller, 1852)

Synonyms
- Blabophanes icterogastra Zeller, 1852; Tinea vivipara Scott, 1863; Tinea adjunctella Walker, 1864; Tinea nivibractella Walker, 1869

= Monopis icterogastra =

Wool moth

Species of moth

Monopis icterogastra, the wool moth, is a moth of the family Tineidae. It is found in most of Australia.

It is thought that the moths of this species lay live young caterpillars rather than eggs.
