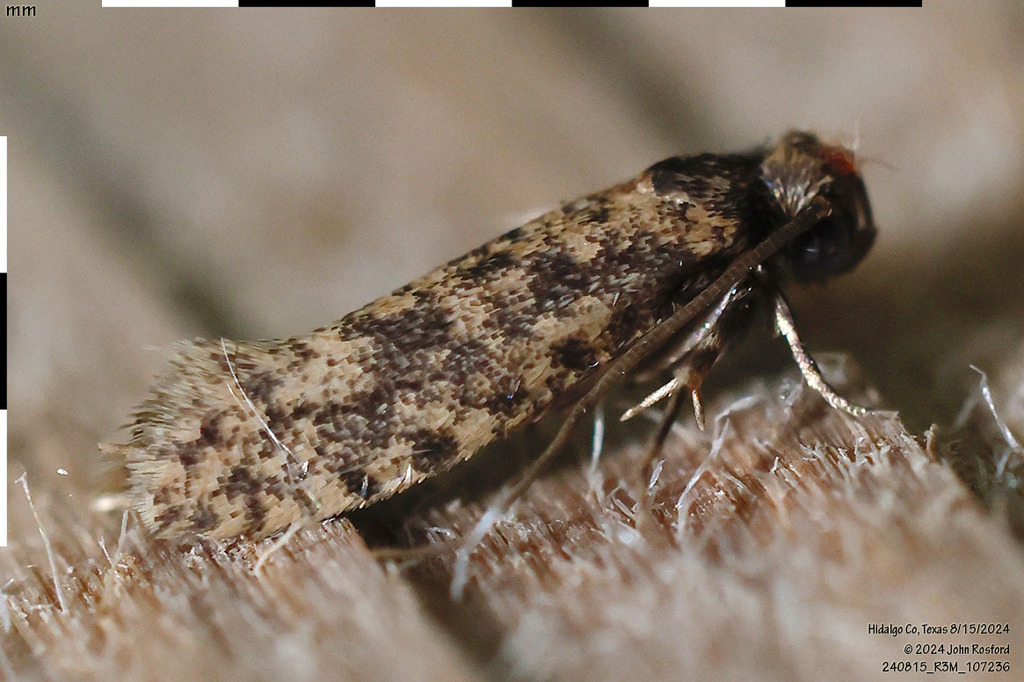

Scientific classification
- Kingdom: Animalia
- Phylum: Arthropoda
- Clade: Pancrustacea
- Class: Insecta
- Order: Lepidoptera
- Family: Tineidae
- Genus: Setomorpha; Zeller, 1852
- Species: S. rutella

Binomial name
- Setomorpha rutella Zeller, 1852

Synonyms
- List: Epilegis cariosella Dietz, 1905; Amadria clemensella Chambers, 1874; Setomorpha contestata Meyrick, 1922; Setomorpha corticinella Snellen, 1885; Setomorpha discipunctella Rebel, 1894; Chrestotes dryas Butler, 1881; Trisyntopa euryspoda Lower, 1918; Apotomia fractiliniella Dietz, 1905; Setomorpha inamoenella Zeller, 1873; Setomorpha majorella Dietz, 1905; Setomorpha margalaestriata Keuchenius, 1917; Gelechia multimaculella Chambers, 1878; Setomorpha operosella Zeller, 1873; Setomorpha ruderella Zeller, 1873; Setomorpha rupicella Zeller, 1852; Setomorpha sigmoidella Dietz, 1905; Setomorpha tineoides Dammerman, 1919; Semiota transversestrigella Dietz, 1905

= Setomorpha =

Tropical tobacco moth

Genus of moths

Setomorpha is a monotypic genus of moth in the family Tineidae described by Philipp Christoph Zeller in 1852. Its only species, Setomorpha rutella, the tropical tobacco moth, was described by the same author in the same year. It is a widely spread species that has been distributed by commerce over much of the warmer parts of Africa, Eurasia, Malaysia, Australia, many Pacific islands and North and South America.

The wingspan is 9–22 mm. Adults are brown and speckled with dark brown or black.

The larvae feed on dried goods, cereals, grain, rice, nuts, seeds and other dry vegetable matter. It is a pest of dried tobacco leaves in some regions and it has been reported as a pest of dried insect specimens. Full-grown larvae are about 17 mm long, cylindrical, dirty white and skin transparent. The head is red brown.

The larva pupates in a closely woven and smooth cocoon within a loosely spun outer framework or outer cocoon, to which particles of food and excrement adhere.
