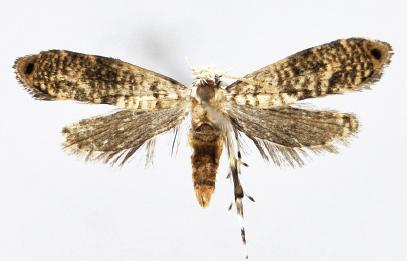
- Tinissa apicimaculata

Scientific classification
- Kingdom: Animalia
- Phylum: Arthropoda
- Clade: Pancrustacea
- Class: Insecta
- Order: Lepidoptera
- Family: Tineidae
- Subfamily: Scardiinae; Eyer, 1924

Synonyms
- Tinissinae Gozmány & Vári, 1973

= Scardiinae =

Subfamily of moths

The Scardiinae are a subfamily of moth of the family Tineidae. Scardiinae are fungivorous and are characterised by larval features and lack of gnathos.

== Genera ==
- Afroscardia Robinson,
- Amorophaga
- Archyala Meyrick, 1889
- Bythocrates
- Cnismorectis
- Coniastis
- Cranaodes
- Daviscardia
- Diataga
- Dorata
- Hilaroptera Gozmány, 1969
- Leptozancla Meyrick, 1920
- Montescardia
- Morophaga Herrich-Schäffer, 1853
- Pelecystola Meyrick, 1920
- Scardia
- Scardiella
- Semeoloncha Gozmány, 1968
- Tinissa Walker, 1864
- Trigonarchis
- Vespitinea
