= Archyala pentazyga =

- Living specimen

Scientific classification
- Kingdom: Animalia
- Phylum: Arthropoda
- Clade: Pancrustacea
- Class: Insecta
- Order: Lepidoptera
- Family: Tineidae
- Genus: Archyala
- Species: A. pentazyga

Binomial name
- Archyala pentazyga Meyrick, 1915

Species of moth endemic to New Zealand

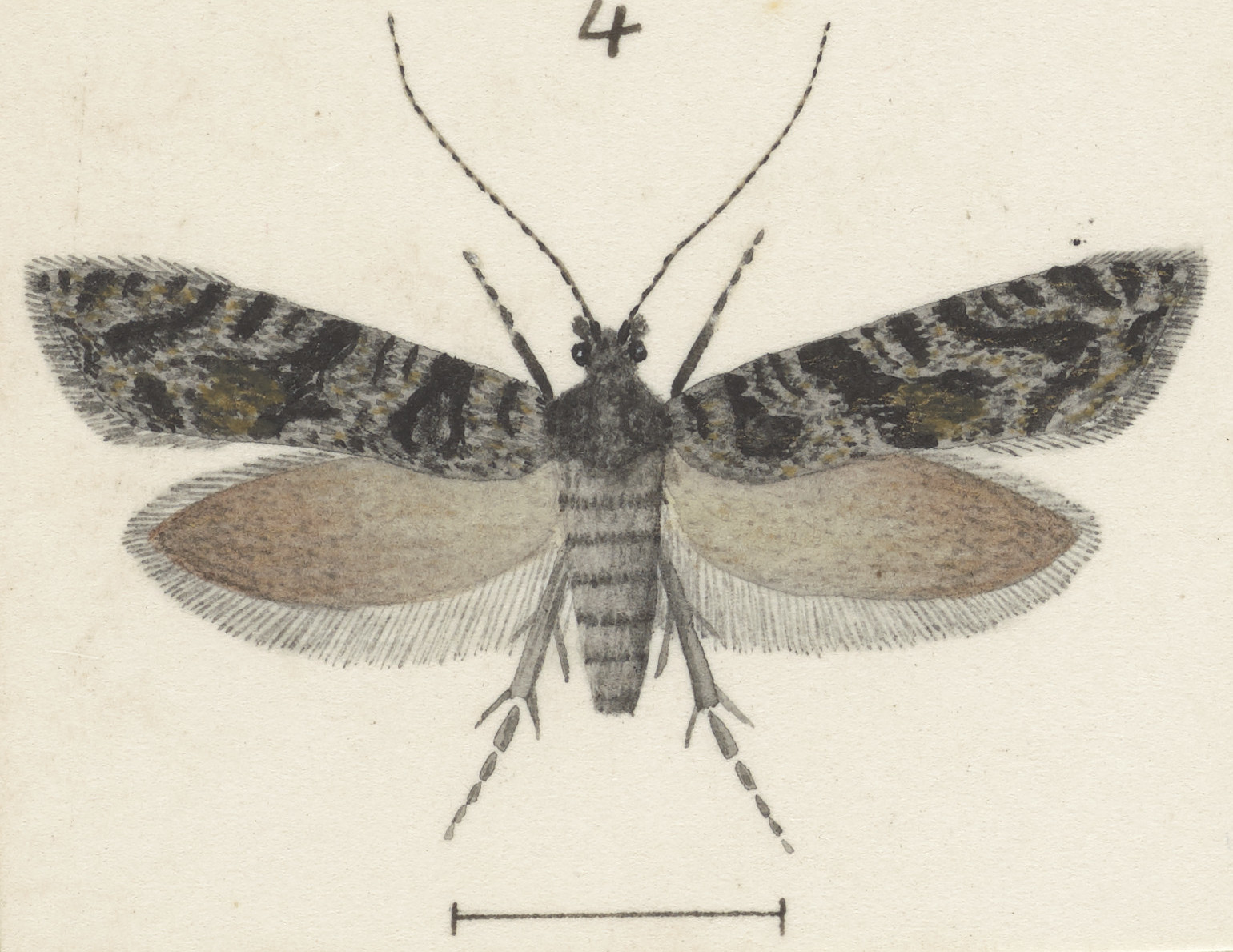
Illustration of male

Archyala pentazyga is a species of moth in the family Tineidae. It was first described by Edward Meyrick in 1915. It is endemic to New Zealand and has been observed in the North and South Islands. This species inhabits native beech forest. Adult moths are day flying and are commonly observed on the wing in January and February.

== Taxonomy ==
A. pentazyga was first described by Edward Meyrick in 1915 using a specimen collected by George Vernon Hudson at Days Bay in Wellington in January. In 1927 Alfred Philpott studied the male genitalia of this species. Hudson discussed and illustrated this species in his 1928 book The butterflies and moths of New Zealand. The male holotype is held at the Natural History Museum, London.

== Description ==
Meyrick described the species as follows:

♂. 13mm. Head fuscous. Palpi fuscous mixed with darker, rough scales of second joint longer than in paraglypta. Thorax and abdomen rather dark fuscous. Forewings elongate, narrow, costa slightly arched, apex obtuse, termen slightly rounded, rather strongly oblique; fuscous, with fine rather oblique transverse striae of dark-fuscous scales; five rather narrow oblique transverse dark-fuscous fasciae, first from 1/5 of costa, interrupted in disc and not reaching dorsum, second and third connected by a suffused patch in disc, third interrupted beneath this, fourth not reaching tornus, fifth curved beneath to termen above tornus : cilia fuscous, with blackish subbasal line. Hindwings rather dark fuscous, lighter and rather thinly scaled towards base : cilia fuscous, with dark-fuscous subbasal line.

== Distribution ==
This species is endemic to New Zealand. It has been observed in the North and South Islands.

== Habitat ==
A. pentazyga inhabits native New Zealand beech forest.

== Behaviour ==
At rest.

The adult moths are day flying and are active in strong sunlight. They are observed on the wing most commonly during January and February. Adults can be seen resting on the black beech tree trunks and as a result can be very inconspicuous. When resting it stands on all legs, with the wings forming a medium pitched roof, and the antennae are held widely spaced and prominently elevated.
