= Conchata =

Conchata may refer to

- Conchata Ferrell (1943–2020), American actress
- Tinissa conchata, a moth of the family Tineidae
