= Scardia =

Scardia is an Italian surname, heavily concentrated in the Heel of Italy. It may also refer to:

- 5248 Scardia, a main-belt asteroid
- Scardia (moth), a fungus moth genus
- Stachys scardia, a species of Stachys
- a name for the Aristolochia recorded in App. Herb 19
