= Tinissa wayfoongi =

Scientific classification
- Kingdom: Animalia
- Phylum: Arthropoda
- Clade: Pancrustacea
- Class: Insecta
- Order: Lepidoptera
- Family: Tineidae
- Genus: Tinissa
- Species: T. wayfoongi

Binomial name
- Tinissa wayfoongi Robinson & Tuck, 1998

Species of moth

Tinissa wayfoongi is a moth of the family Tineidae. It was described by Robinson and Tuck in 1998. It is found in Brunei.
