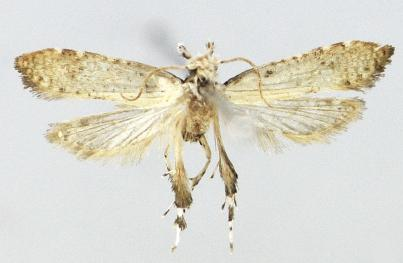

Scientific classification
- Kingdom: Animalia
- Phylum: Arthropoda
- Clade: Pancrustacea
- Class: Insecta
- Order: Lepidoptera
- Family: Tineidae
- Genus: Tinissa
- Species: T. connata

Binomial name
- Tinissa connata Yang & Li, 2012

= Tinissa connata =

Species of moth

Tinissa connata is a moth of the family Tineidae. It is found in China (Fujian, Guangdong and Guangxi).

The wingspan is about 12.5 mm. The forewings are pale yellowish brown, becoming gradually darker from the base to the apex. It has a bluish violet sheen and scattered dark brown dots throughout. The hindwings are yellowish brown, shining bluish violet.

== Etymology ==
The specific name is derived from the Latin connatus (meaning connate) and refers to the fusion of the juxta and valva.
