= Tinissa cultellata =

Scientific classification
- Kingdom: Animalia
- Phylum: Arthropoda
- Clade: Pancrustacea
- Class: Insecta
- Order: Lepidoptera
- Family: Tineidae
- Genus: Tinissa
- Species: T. cultellata

Binomial name
- Tinissa cultellata Gozmány & Vári, 1973

Species of moth

Tinissa cultellata is a moth of the family Tineidae. It was described by László Anthony Gozmány and Lajos Vári in 1973. It is found in Uganda.
