= Scardia (moth) =

Scientific classification
- Kingdom: Animalia
- Phylum: Arthropoda
- Clade: Pancrustacea
- Class: Insecta
- Order: Lepidoptera
- Family: Tineidae
- Subfamily: Scardiinae
- Genus: Scardia; Treitschke, 1830

Type species
- Phycis boleti Fabricius, 1798

Diversity
- 6–9 species

Synonyms
- See text

Genus of moths

Scardia is a genus of the fungus moth family (Tineidae). Therein, it belongs to the subfamily Scardiinae, of which it is the type genus. Several of the species placed here in earlier times have been moved to other genera of the subfamily, e.g. Amorophaga, Montescardia, and Morophaga.

== Species ==
The species placed in Scardia are:

- Scardia alleni Robinson, 1986
- Scardia amurensis Zagulajev, 1965
- Scardia anatomella Grote, 1881 (= S. fiskeella)
- Scardia assamensis Robinson, 1986
- Scardia boletella (Fabricius, 1794) (= S. boleti, S. polypori, S. relicta)
- Scardia caucasica Zagulajev, 1965
- Scardia isthmiella Busck, 1914 (tentatively placed here)
- Scardia pharetrodes Meyrick, 1934 (tentatively placed here)
- Scardia tholerodes Meyrick, 1894 (tentatively placed here)

== Synonyms ==
Junior synonyms of Scardia are:

- Agarica Sodoffsky 1837
- Duomitella Kozhantschikov 1923
- Fernaldia Grote 1881
