= Tinissa eumetrota =

Scientific classification
- Kingdom: Animalia
- Phylum: Arthropoda
- Clade: Pancrustacea
- Class: Insecta
- Order: Lepidoptera
- Family: Tineidae
- Genus: Tinissa
- Species: T. eumetrota

Binomial name
- Tinissa eumetrota Meyrick, 1926

Species of moth

Tinissa eumetrota is a moth of the family Tineidae. It was described by Edward Meyrick in 1926. It is found in New Ireland.
