= Tinissa palmodes =

Scientific classification
- Kingdom: Animalia
- Phylum: Arthropoda
- Clade: Pancrustacea
- Class: Insecta
- Order: Lepidoptera
- Family: Tineidae
- Genus: Tinissa
- Species: T. palmodes

Binomial name
- Tinissa palmodes Meyrick, 1917

Species of moth

Tinissa palmodes is a moth of the family Tineidae. It was described by Edward Meyrick in 1917. It is found on New Guinea.
