= Tinissa torvella =

Scientific classification
- Kingdom: Animalia
- Phylum: Arthropoda
- Clade: Pancrustacea
- Class: Insecta
- Order: Lepidoptera
- Family: Tineidae
- Genus: Tinissa
- Species: T. torvella

Binomial name
- Tinissa torvella Walker, 1864

Species of moth

Tinissa torvella is a moth of the family Tineidae. It was described by Francis Walker in 1864. It is found in Sri Lanka.
