= Morophaga clonodes =

Scientific classification
- Kingdom: Animalia
- Phylum: Arthropoda
- Class: Insecta
- Order: Lepidoptera
- Family: Tineidae
- Genus: Morophaga
- Species: M. clonodes

Binomial name
- Morophaga clonodes (Meyrick, 1893)

Synonyms
- Scardia clonodes Meyrick, 1893; Scardia porphyrea Lower, 1903; Scardia maculosa Diakonoff, 1949

Species of moth

Morophaga clonodes is a moth of the family Tineidae. It is found in eastern Australia, from Cape York to Sydney.
