= Scardia amurensis =

Scientific classification
- Kingdom: Animalia
- Phylum: Arthropoda
- Class: Insecta
- Order: Lepidoptera
- Family: Tineidae
- Genus: Scardia
- Species: S. amurensis

Binomial name
- Scardia amurensis Zagulajev, 1965

Species of moth

Scardia amurensis is a moth of the family Tineidae. It is found in the Russian Far East (Amur, Primorskii), Japan and possibly adjacent parts of China. In North America, it has been recorded from Georgia, Maryland, Mississippi, New Jersey, North Carolina, South Carolina, Texas and West Virginia.

The wingspan is about 40 mm.

The larvae have been recorded feeding on Globifomes graveolens, Fomes species and possibly other bracket fungi.
