= Tinissa ruwenzorica =

Scientific classification
- Kingdom: Animalia
- Phylum: Arthropoda
- Clade: Pancrustacea
- Class: Insecta
- Order: Lepidoptera
- Family: Tineidae
- Genus: Tinissa
- Species: T. ruwenzorica

Binomial name
- Tinissa ruwenzorica Gozmány, 1966

Species of moth

Tinissa ruwenzorica is a moth of the family Tineidae. It was described by László Anthony Gozmány in 1966. It is found in Uganda.
