= Afroscardia =

Scientific classification
- Kingdom: Animalia
- Phylum: Arthropoda
- Clade: Pancrustacea
- Class: Insecta
- Order: Lepidoptera
- Family: Tineidae
- Subfamily: Scardiinae
- Genus: Afroscardia; Robinson, 1986

Genus of moths

Afroscardia is a genus of moths belonging to the family Tineidae.

This genus contains only one species: Afroscardia capnochalca (Meyrick, 1932) from Uganda.
