= Pelecystola fraudulentella =

Scientific classification
- Kingdom: Animalia
- Phylum: Arthropoda
- Clade: Pancrustacea
- Class: Insecta
- Order: Lepidoptera
- Family: Tineidae
- Genus: Pelecystola
- Species: P. fraudulentella

Binomial name
- Pelecystola fraudulentella (Zeller, 1852)

Species of moth

Pelecystola fraudulentella is a species of moth belonging to the family Tineidae.

It is native to Europe.
