= Tinissa indica =

Scientific classification
- Kingdom: Animalia
- Phylum: Arthropoda
- Clade: Pancrustacea
- Class: Insecta
- Order: Lepidoptera
- Family: Tineidae
- Genus: Tinissa
- Species: T. indica

Binomial name
- Tinissa indica Robinson, 1976

Species of moth

Tinissa indica is a moth of the family Tineidae. It is found in China (Hainan and Yunnan), Taiwan, India, Sikkim and Bhutan.

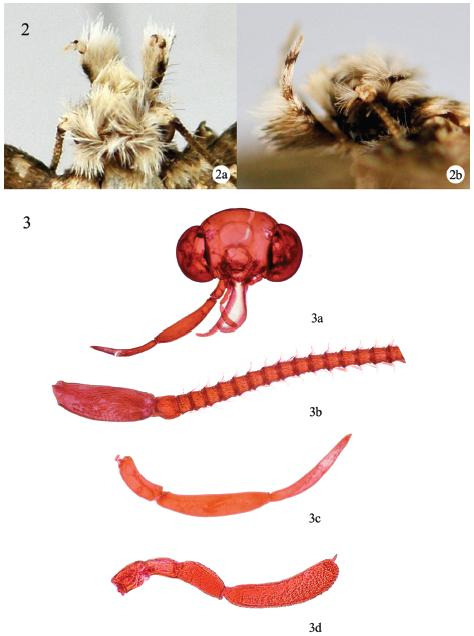
Head structure of T. indica, ♂. 2 Head with scales: 2a dorsal view; 2b lateral view; 3 Head scales removed: 3a head, slide No. NKYLL012; 3b antenna; 3c labial palpus; 3d maxillary palpus

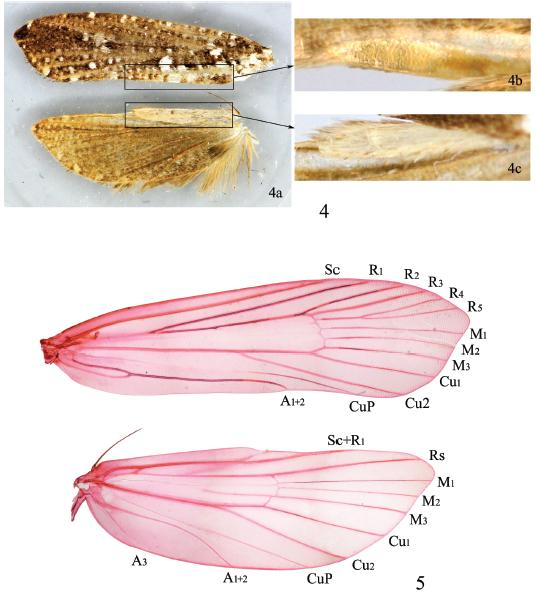
Wings of T. indica, ♂. 4 Wings and patches: 4a wings; 4b oval patch; 4c rough scale patch; 5 Venation, slide No. NKYLL012

The wingspan is 24−28 mm for males and about 30 mm for females.
