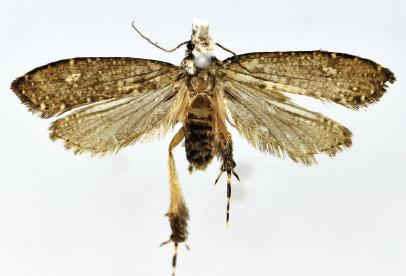

Scientific classification
- Kingdom: Animalia
- Phylum: Arthropoda
- Clade: Pancrustacea
- Class: Insecta
- Order: Lepidoptera
- Family: Tineidae
- Genus: Tinissa
- Species: T. leguminella

Binomial name
- Tinissa leguminella Yang & Li, 2012

= Tinissa leguminella =

Species of moth

Tinissa leguminella is a moth of the family Tineidae. It is found in Yunnan, China.

The wingspan is 16.5–19 mm for males. The forewings have a brown ground color, shining dark purplish, scattered with conspicuous white spots throughout, regularly arranged along margins as well as between veins. The hindwings are pale grayish brown, shining dark purplish, with small pale dots apically.

== Etymology ==
The specific name is derived from the Latin legumin- (meaning legume) and the postfix -ellus and refers to the beanpod-shaped uncus lobe.
