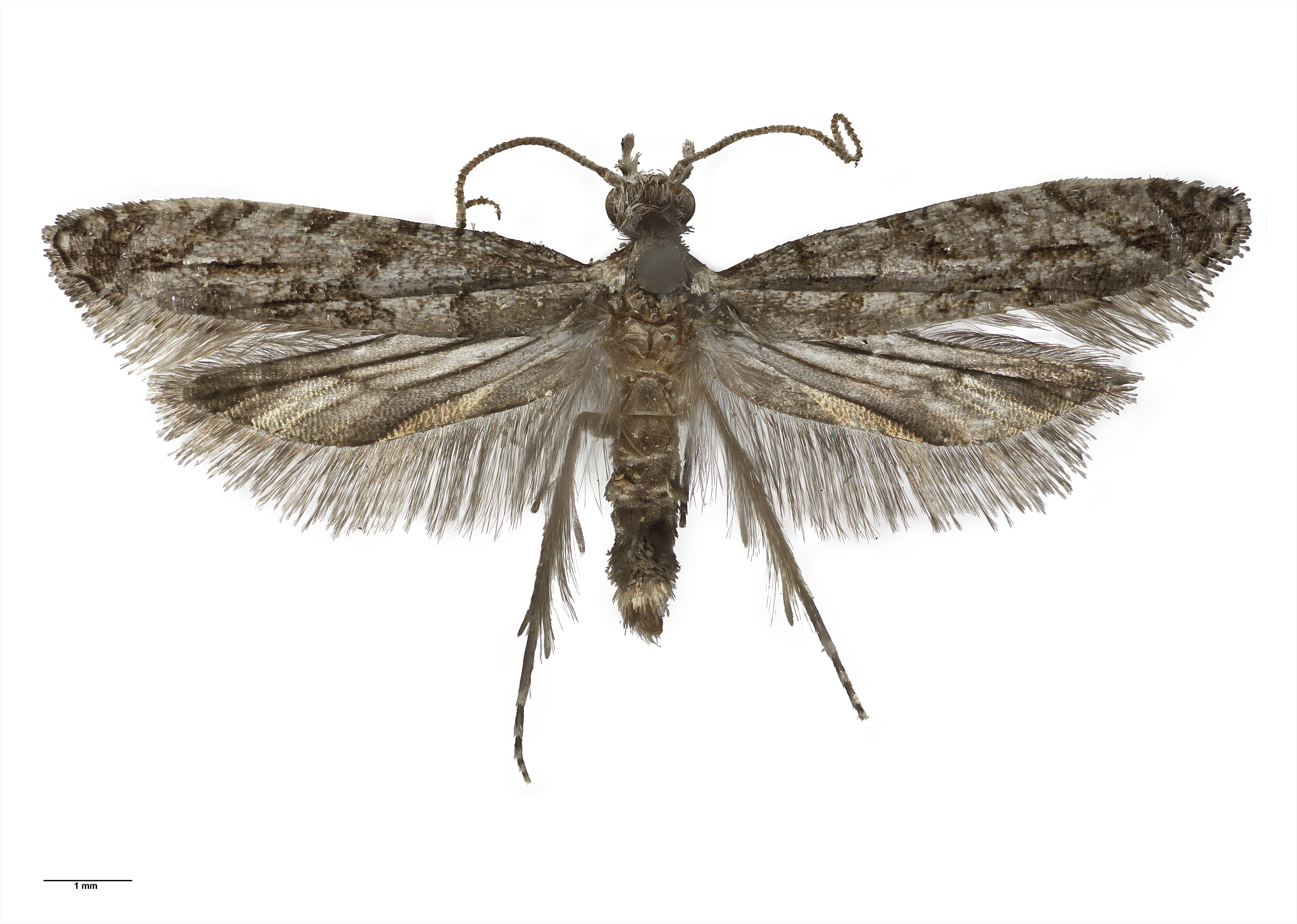
- Archyala tigrina (Philpott, 1930) holotype specimen held at Auckland Museum

Scientific classification
- Kingdom: Animalia
- Phylum: Arthropoda
- Clade: Pancrustacea
- Class: Insecta
- Order: Lepidoptera
- Family: Tineidae
- Subfamily: Scardiinae
- Genus: Archyala; Meyrick, 1889

Type species
- Archyala paraglypta Meyrick, 1889

Synonyms
- Progonarma Meyrick, 1911

= Archyala =

Genus of moths

Archyala is a genus of moths belonging to the family Tineidae. This genus is endemic to New Zealand. Archyala was first described by Edward Meyrick in 1889.

== Species ==
The species currently within this genus include:

- Archyala culta Philpott, 1931
- Archyala lindsayi (Philpott, 1927)
- Archyala opulenta Philpott, 1926
- Archyala paraglypta Meyrick, 1889
- Archyala pentazyga Meyrick, 1915
- Archyala terranea (Butler, 1879)
