= Tinissa baliomicta =

Scientific classification
- Kingdom: Animalia
- Phylum: Arthropoda
- Clade: Pancrustacea
- Class: Insecta
- Order: Lepidoptera
- Family: Tineidae
- Genus: Tinissa
- Species: T. baliomicta

Binomial name
- Tinissa baliomicta Meyrick, 1928

Species of moth

Tinissa baliomicta is a moth of the family Tineidae. It was described by Edward Meyrick in 1928. It is found on the Philippines.
