= Tinissa goliath =

Scientific classification
- Kingdom: Animalia
- Phylum: Arthropoda
- Clade: Pancrustacea
- Class: Insecta
- Order: Lepidoptera
- Family: Tineidae
- Genus: Tinissa
- Species: T. goliath

Binomial name
- Tinissa goliath Robinson, 1976

Species of moth

Tinissa goliath is a moth of the family Tineidae. It was described by Dr. Gaden S. Robinson in 1976. It is found in New Guinea.
