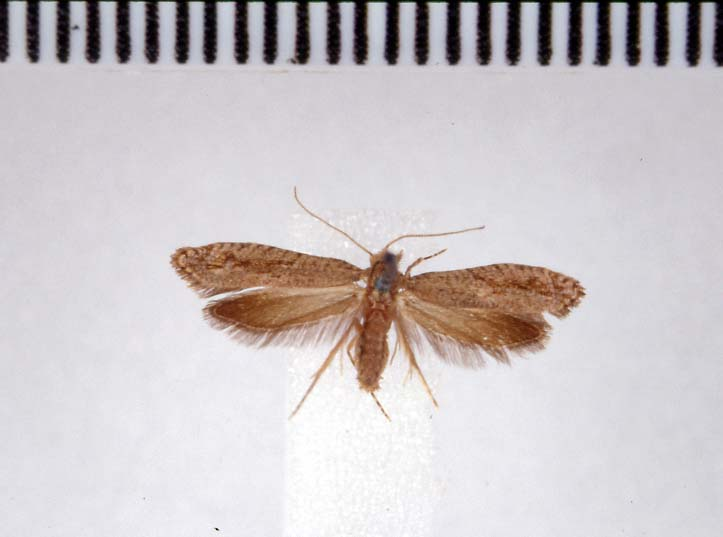
- Male holotype specimen

Conservation status
- Data Deficit (NZ TCS)

Scientific classification
- Kingdom: Animalia
- Phylum: Arthropoda
- Clade: Pancrustacea
- Class: Insecta
- Order: Lepidoptera
- Family: Tineidae
- Genus: Archyala
- Species: A. culta

Binomial name
- Archyala culta Philpott, 1931

= Archyala culta =

Species of moth endemic to New Zealand

Archyala culta is a species of moth in the family Tineidae. This species is endemic to New Zealand and has only been observed in Otago. Adults are on the wing in December. It has been hypothesised that larvae of this species inhabits and feeds on dead wood.

As at 2025 this species was classified as "Data Deficient" under the New Zealand Threat Classification System by the Department of Conservation. This species has only been collected at Opoho and is only known from its type specimen.

== Taxonomy ==
This species was described by Alfred Philpott in 1931 from a specimen collected by Charles E. Clarke at Opoho, Dunedin on the 17 December 1921. In 1939 George Hudson discussed and illustrated the species. The holotype specimen is held at the Auckland War Memorial Museum.

== Description ==
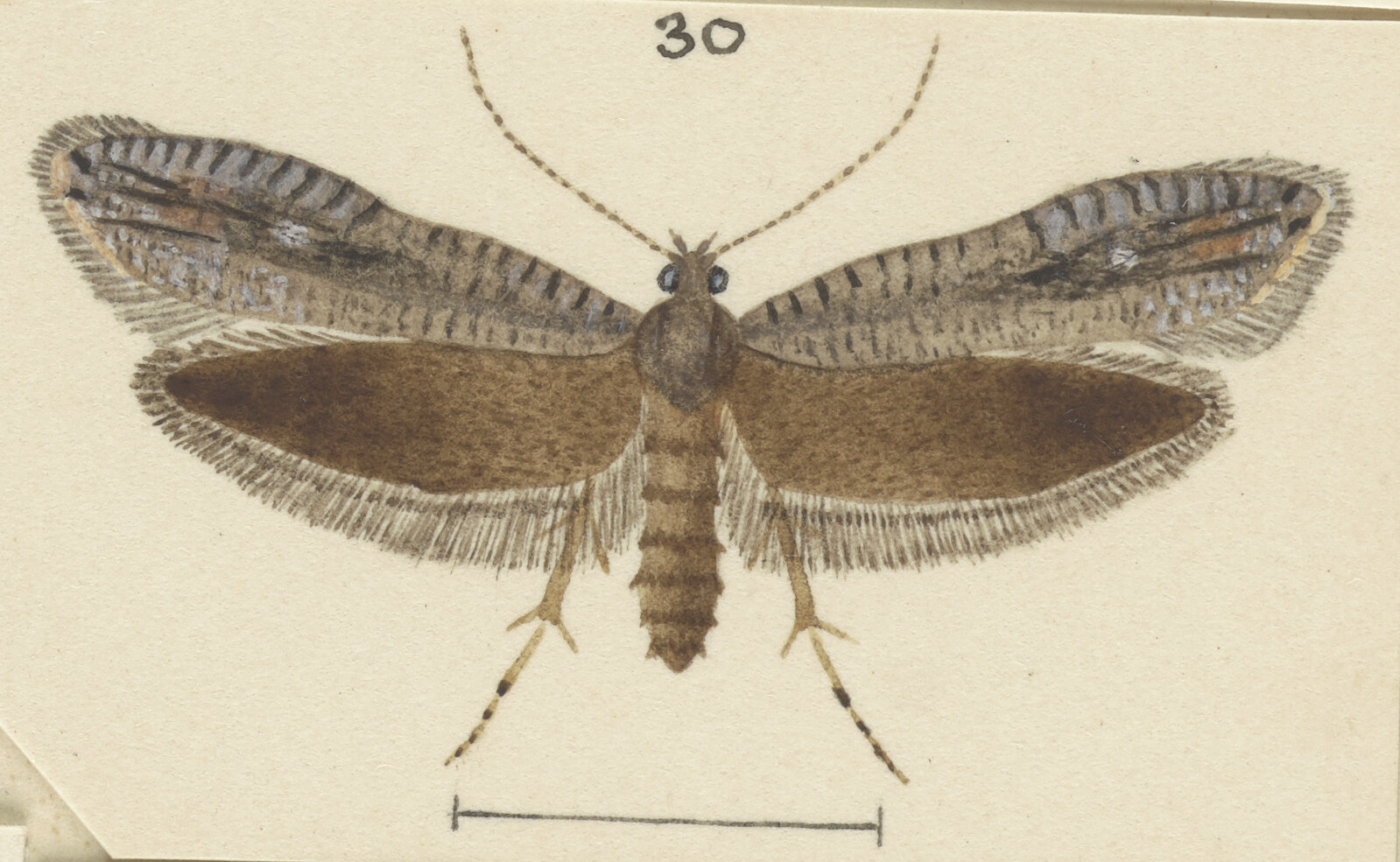
Illustration of male.

Philpott described the species as follows:

♂. 15 mm. Head and palpi greyish brown. Antennae grey annulated with fuscous. Thorax brown. Abdomen greyish brown. Legs greyish ochreous, tarsi annulated with fuscous. Forewings elongate, costa sinuate before middle, apex round-pointed termen straight, oblique; light grey: numerous fine curved transverse dark fuscous strigulae from base to apex; a very dark obscure fuscous linear marking in disc: fringes grey mixed with fuscous; base pale and a sub-basal blackish fuscous line. Hindwings purplish fuscous, darker apically: fringes dark greyish fuscous with darker basal line.

Hudson stated that this species could be distinguished by the peculiar outline of the costa of fore-wings, and absence of any tendency for the strigulae to coalesce in pairs.

== Distribution ==
This species is endemic to New Zealand. This species is only known at its type locality of Opoho.

== Life history ==
It has been hypothesised that larvae of this species inhabits dead wood, boring into it and feeding on it.

== Conservation status ==
In 2025 this species was classified by the New Zealand Department of Conservation as "data deficient" under the New Zealand Threat Classification System.
