= Tinissa polystacta =

Scientific classification
- Kingdom: Animalia
- Phylum: Arthropoda
- Clade: Pancrustacea
- Class: Insecta
- Order: Lepidoptera
- Family: Tineidae
- Genus: Tinissa
- Species: T. polystacta

Binomial name
- Tinissa polystacta (Meyrick, 1918)

Synonyms
- Scardia polystacta Meyrick, 1918; Polymnestra perilithas Meyrick, 1927

Species of moth

Tinissa polystacta is a moth of the family Tineidae. It was described by Edward Meyrick in 1918. It is found in South Africa.
