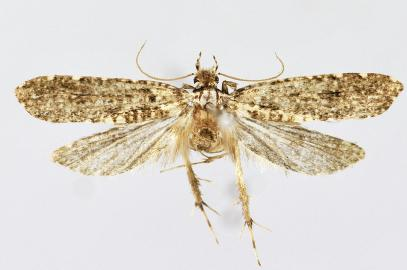

Scientific classification
- Kingdom: Animalia
- Phylum: Arthropoda
- Clade: Pancrustacea
- Class: Insecta
- Order: Lepidoptera
- Family: Tineidae
- Genus: Tinissa
- Species: T. spirella

Binomial name
- Tinissa spirella Yang & Li, 2012

= Tinissa spirella =

Species of moth

Tinissa spirella is a moth of the family Tineidae. It is found in Sichuan, China.

The wingspan is about 20 mm for males. The forewings are yellowish brown mixed with grayish brown, shining bluish violet, with scattered faint white dots, large and conspicuous at the base, along the costa, termen and dorsum. The hindwings are grayish brown, shining bluish violet.

== Etymology ==
The specific name is derived from the Latin spirellus (meaning spiral) and refers to the small, spiral, whorl-shaped juxta.
