= Tinissa distracta =

Scientific classification
- Kingdom: Animalia
- Phylum: Arthropoda
- Clade: Pancrustacea
- Class: Insecta
- Order: Lepidoptera
- Family: Tineidae
- Genus: Tinissa
- Species: T. distracta

Binomial name
- Tinissa distracta Meyrick, 1916

Species of moth

Tinissa distracta is a moth of the family Tineidae. It was described by Edward Meyrick in 1916. It is found in India.
