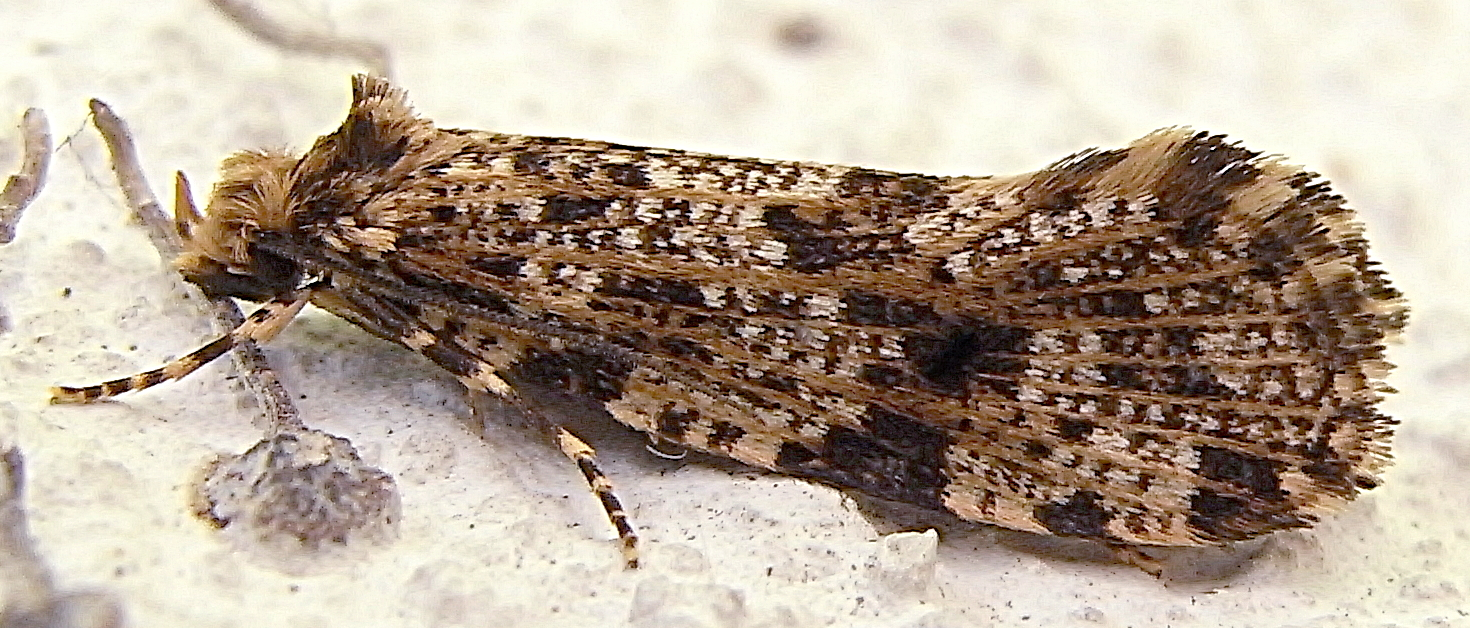

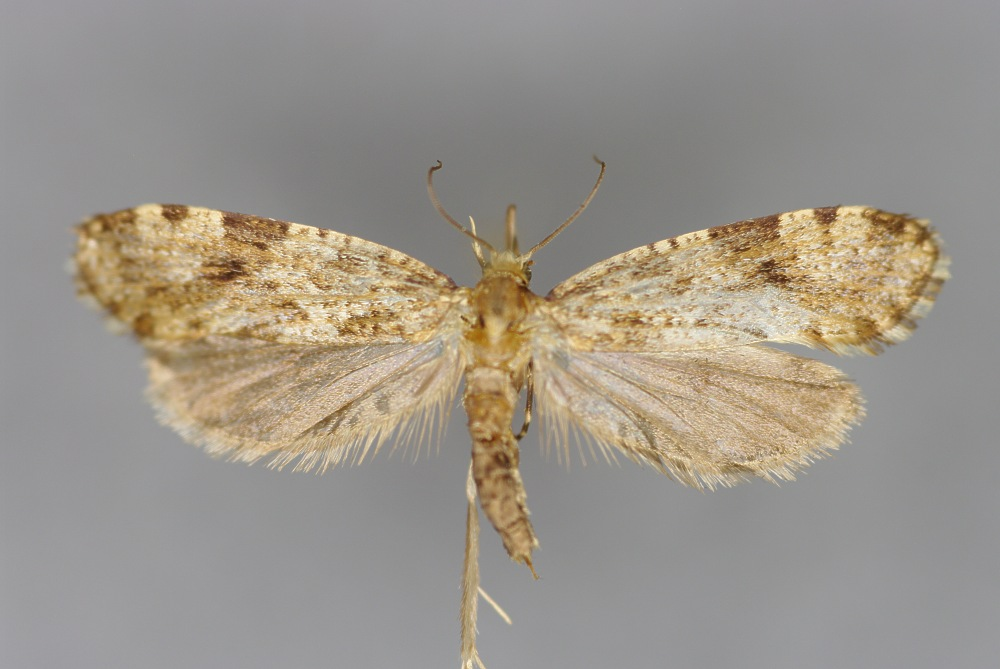

Scientific classification
- Kingdom: Animalia
- Phylum: Arthropoda
- Clade: Pancrustacea
- Class: Insecta
- Order: Lepidoptera
- Family: Tineidae
- Genus: Montescardia
- Species: M. tessulatella

Binomial name
- Montescardia tessulatella (Lienig & Zeller, 1846)

= Montescardia tessulatella =

Species of moth

Montescardia tessulatella is a moth of the family Tineidae. It is found in most of Europe, except the Iberian Peninsula, the Benelux, Britain, Ireland, the Balkan and Greece.

The wingspan is 20–28 mm.
