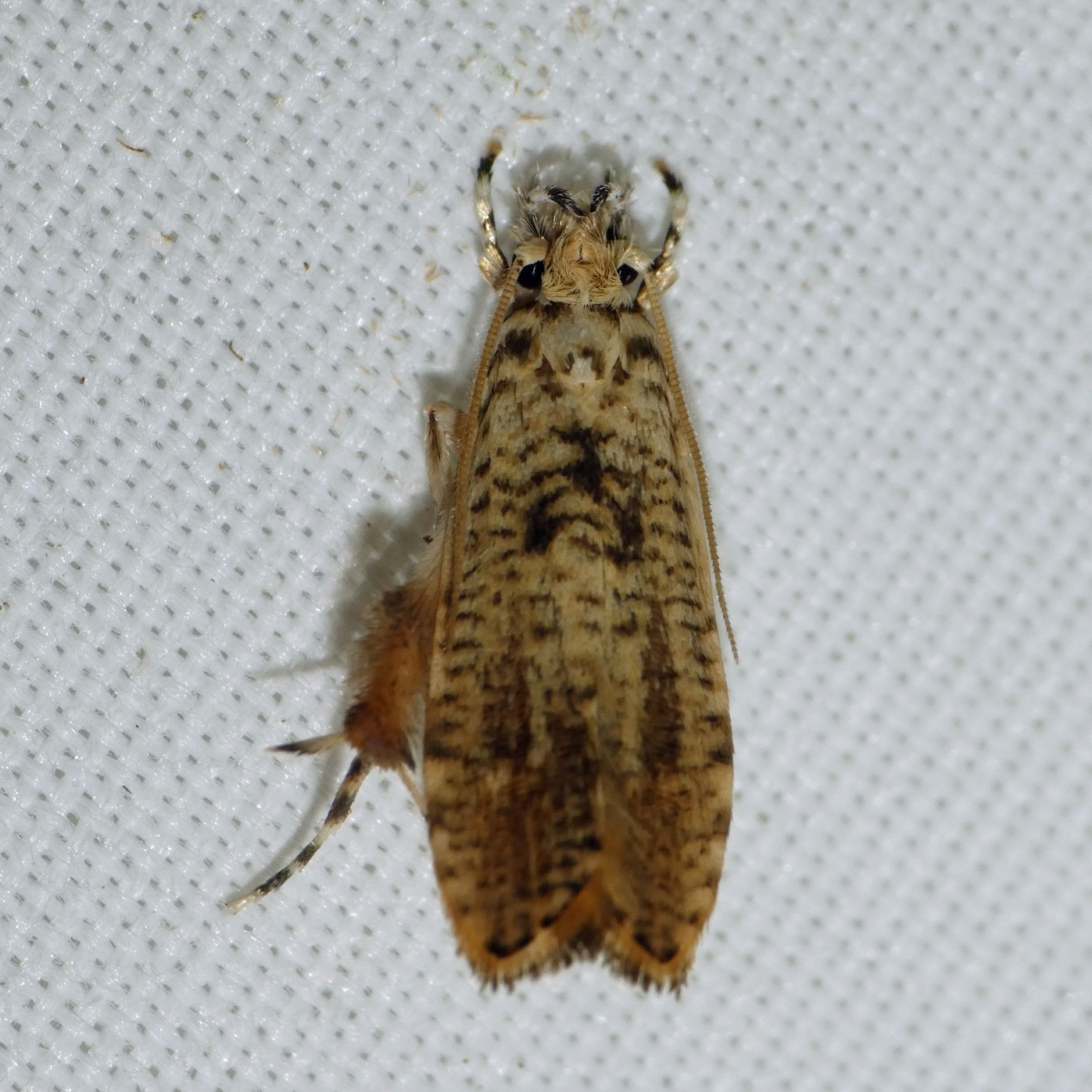

Scientific classification
- Kingdom: Animalia
- Phylum: Arthropoda
- Clade: Pancrustacea
- Class: Insecta
- Order: Lepidoptera
- Family: Tineidae
- Genus: Tinissa
- Species: T. cinerascens

Binomial name
- Tinissa cinerascens Meyrick, 1910

= Tinissa cinerascens =

Species of moth

Tinissa cinerascens is a species of moth in the family Tineidae. It is found in New Guinea and surrounding islands and from the coasts of Queensland, Australia.

The larvae probably feed on fungi growing on trees in forests.
