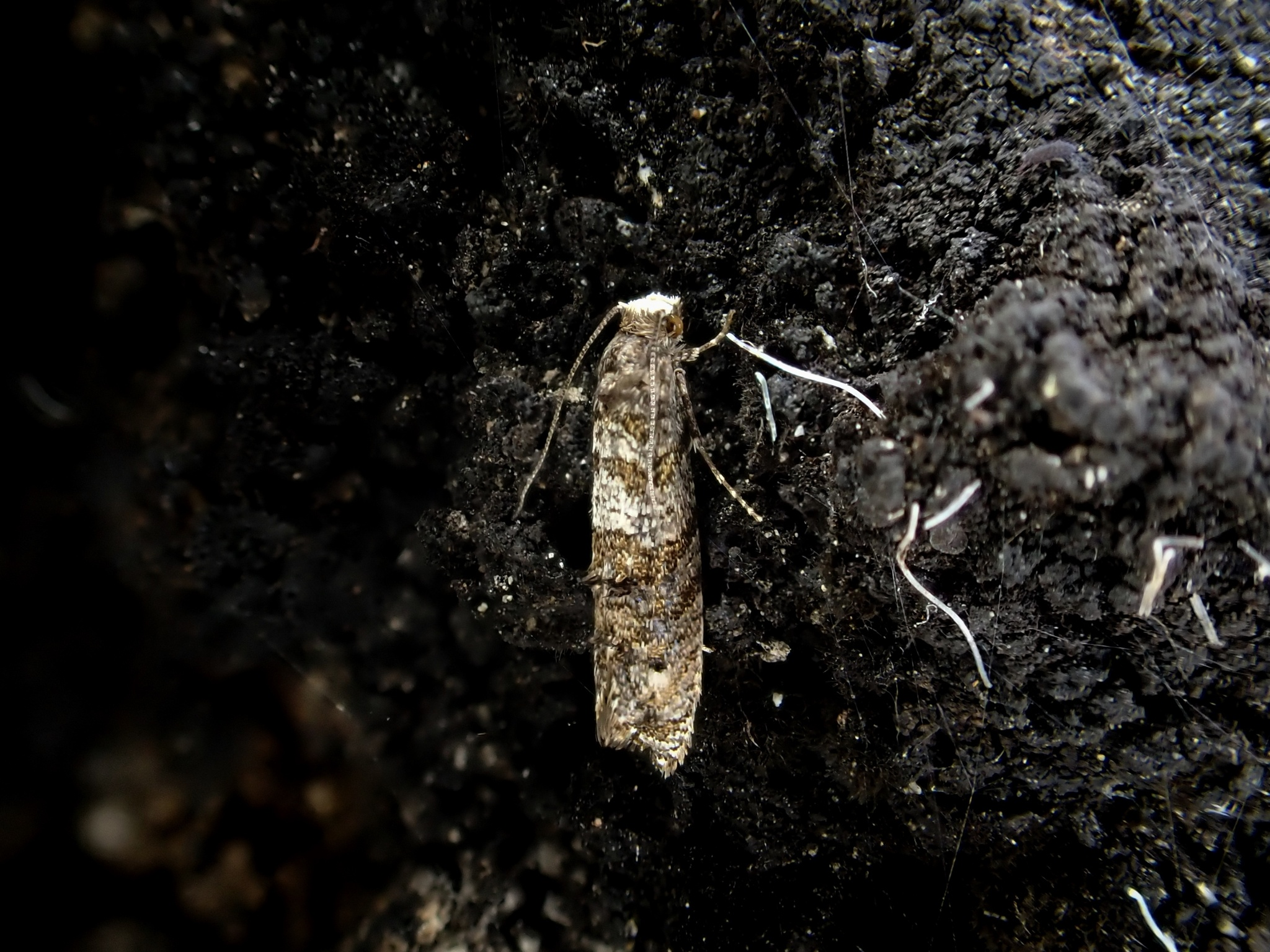
- Archyala lindsayi seen near Glentui, Canterbury

Scientific classification
- Kingdom: Animalia
- Phylum: Arthropoda
- Clade: Pancrustacea
- Class: Insecta
- Order: Lepidoptera
- Family: Tineidae
- Genus: Archyala
- Species: A. lindsayi

Binomial name
- Archyala lindsayi (Philpott, 1927)

Synonyms
- Tinea lindsayi Philpott, 1927

= Archyala lindsayi =

Species of moth endemic to New Zealand

Archyala lindsayi is a species of moth in the family Tineidae. This species is endemic to New Zealand and has been observed in Canterbury. It is classified as "At Risk, Naturally Uncommon" by the Department of Conservation.

== Taxonomy ==
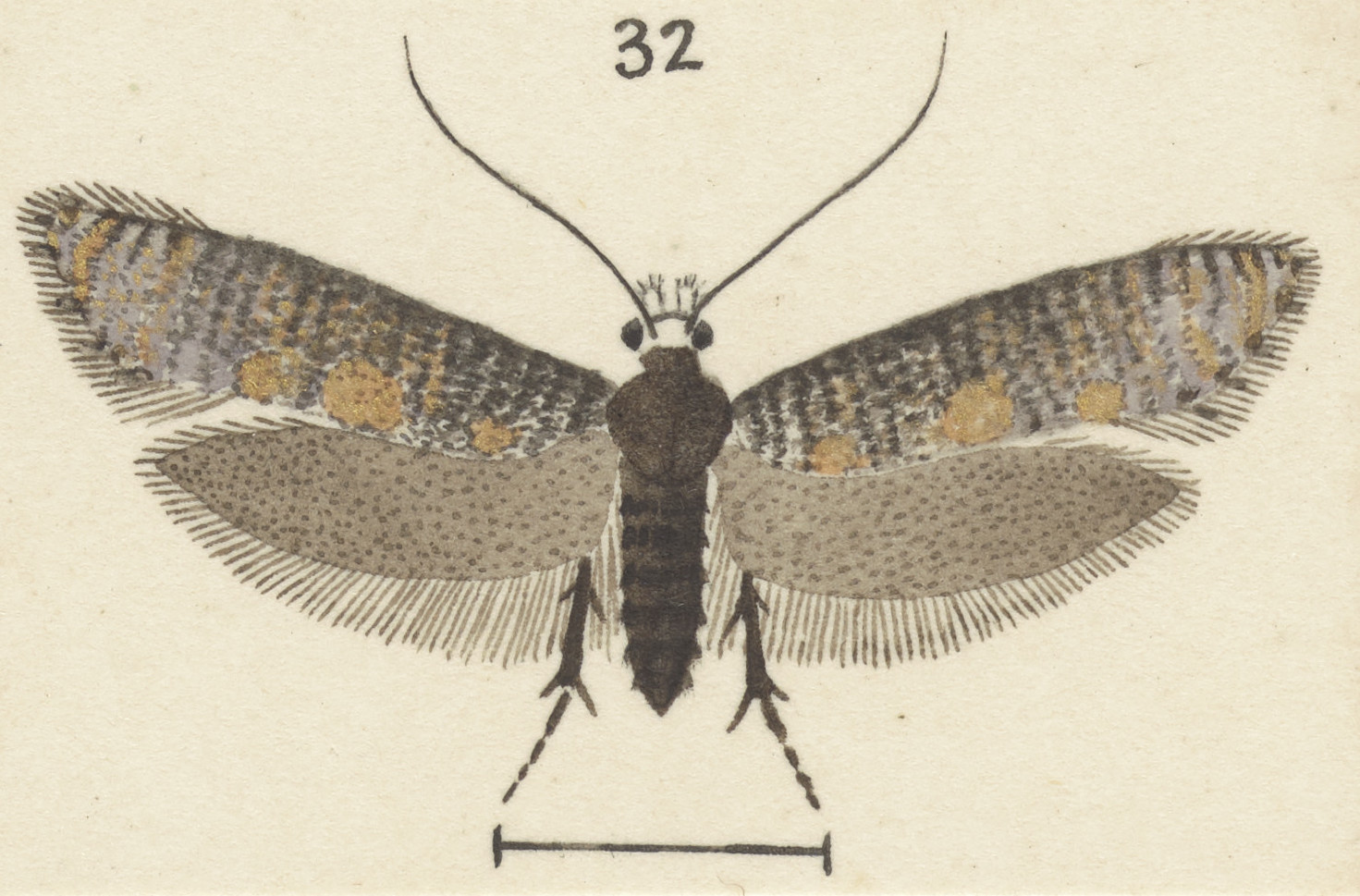
Illustration of Archyala lindsayi

This species was described by Alfred Philpott in 1927 and given the name Tinea lindsayi. Philpott used a specimen Stewart Lindsay collected at Mount Grey in North Canterbury and named the species in his honour. In 1928 George Hudson discussed and illustrated the species in his book The Butterflies and Moths of New Zealand. However John S. Dugdale is of the opinion that the illustration is an inaccurate representation of the species. In 1988 Dugdale placed this species within the genus Archyala. The holotype specimen is held at the Canterbury Museum.

== Description ==
Philpott described the species as follows:

♂ 11 mm. Head dark bronzy-brown, frons white. Maxillary palpi white. Labial palpi bronzy-brown, terminal segment white. Antennae grey annulated with black. Thorax and abdomen dark purplish-fuscous. Legs greyish-fuscous, tarsi annulated with ochreous-white. Forewings elongate, parallel-sided, costa slightly arched, apex obtuse, termen straight, oblique; leaden-grey; numerous transverse irregular fuscous-black fasciae; space between fasciae, particularly on apical half, filled with bright bronzy-brown: fringes fuscous with a mixed bronzy and dark fuscous basal line. Hindwings dark purplish-fuscous: fringes dark greyish-fuscous.

== Distribution ==
This species is endemic to New Zealand. As at 2000 this species had only been observed at its type locality of Mount Grey. However since then it has been observed in other locations in the Canterbury region.

== Life history ==
It has been hypothesised that larvae of this species inhabits dead wood boring into it and feeding on the fungus-infected wood.

== Conservation status ==
This species has been classified as having the "At Risk, Naturally Uncommon" conservation status under the New Zealand Threat Classification System.
