= Tinissa polysema =

Scientific classification
- Kingdom: Animalia
- Phylum: Arthropoda
- Clade: Pancrustacea
- Class: Insecta
- Order: Lepidoptera
- Family: Tineidae
- Genus: Tinissa
- Species: T. polysema

Binomial name
- Tinissa polysema Zagulajev, 1972

Species of moth

Tinissa polysema is a moth of the family Tineidae. It was described by Zagulajev in 1972. It is found on Java.
