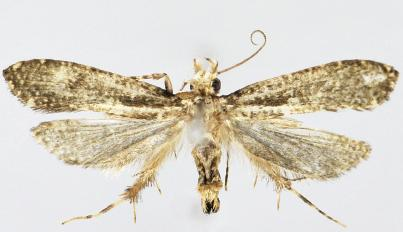

Scientific classification
- Kingdom: Animalia
- Phylum: Arthropoda
- Clade: Pancrustacea
- Class: Insecta
- Order: Lepidoptera
- Family: Tineidae
- Genus: Tinissa
- Species: T. insularia

Binomial name
- Tinissa insularia Robinson, 1976

= Tinissa insularia =

Species of moth

Tinissa insularia is a moth of the family Tineidae. It is found in China (Yunnan), Malaysia, Borneo, Indonesia (Sumatra, Java, Celebes and the Moluccas), the Philippines (Luzon, Mindanao, Palawan, Balabac, Tawi Tawi), New Guinea (Papua, Karkar Island, New Britain) and the Solomon Islands.

The wingspan is about 17 mm for males.
