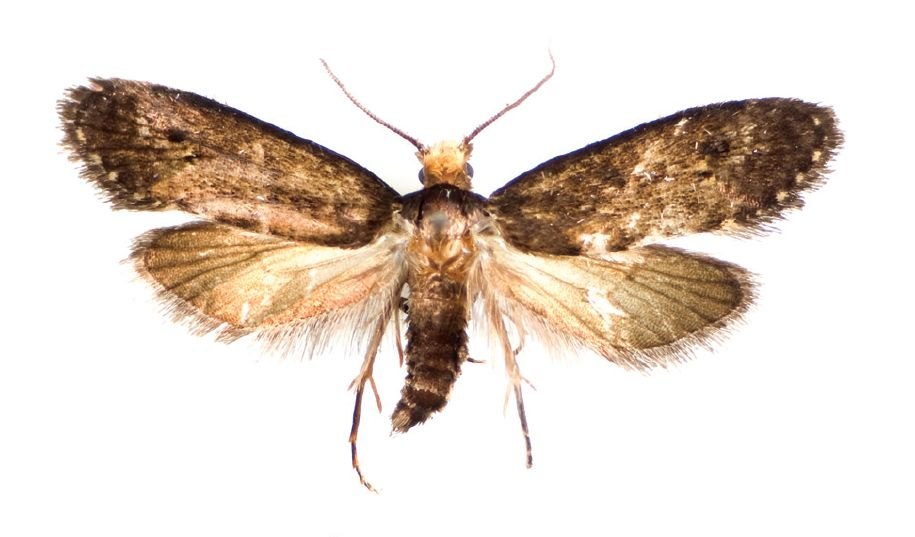

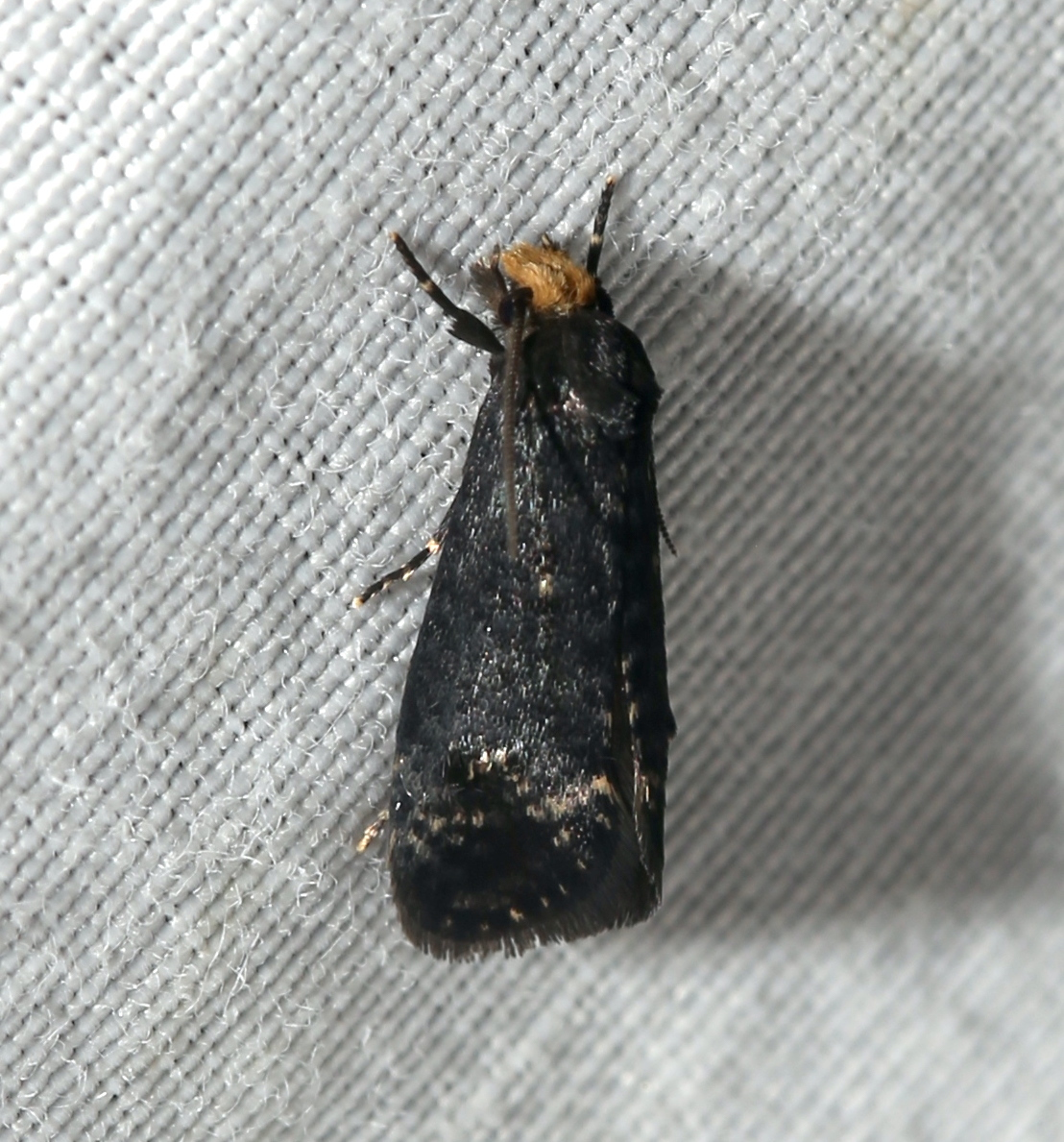

Scientific classification
- Kingdom: Animalia
- Phylum: Arthropoda
- Clade: Pancrustacea
- Class: Insecta
- Order: Lepidoptera
- Family: Tineidae
- Genus: Pelecystola
- Species: P. nearctica

Binomial name
- Pelecystola nearctica S. Davis & D. Davis, 2009

= Pelecystola nearctica =

Species of moth

Pelecystola nearctica is a moth of the family Tineidae. It is found across eastern North America, from Quebec to northern Florida, west to Arkansas.

The length of the forewings is 5.4-6.2 mm for males and 7–8.5 for females. Adults are on wing from April to September.
