= Tinissa transversella =

Scientific classification
- Kingdom: Animalia
- Phylum: Arthropoda
- Clade: Pancrustacea
- Class: Insecta
- Order: Lepidoptera
- Family: Tineidae
- Genus: Tinissa
- Species: T. transversella

Binomial name
- Tinissa transversella (Walker, 1864)

Synonyms
- Gelechia transversella Walker, 1864

Species of moth

Tinissa transversella is a moth of the family Tineidae. It was described by Francis Walker in 1864. It is found on Borneo.
