= Tinissa spaniastra =

Scientific classification
- Kingdom: Animalia
- Phylum: Arthropoda
- Clade: Pancrustacea
- Class: Insecta
- Order: Lepidoptera
- Family: Tineidae
- Genus: Tinissa
- Species: T. spaniastra

Binomial name
- Tinissa spaniastra Meyrick, 1932

Species of moth

Tinissa spaniastra is a moth of the family Tineidae. It was described by Edward Meyrick in 1932. It is found in Ethiopia.
