= Tinissa rigida =

Scientific classification
- Kingdom: Animalia
- Phylum: Arthropoda
- Clade: Pancrustacea
- Class: Insecta
- Order: Lepidoptera
- Family: Tineidae
- Genus: Tinissa
- Species: T. rigida

Binomial name
- Tinissa rigida Meyrick, 1910

Synonyms
- Tinissa heterograpta Meyrick, 1928; Tinissa chloroplocama Meyrick, 1938

Species of moth

Tinissa rigida is a moth of the family Tineidae. It is found from Kai Island to New Guinea and has also been recorded from Kuranda, Queensland, Australia.

The larvae probably feed on fungi growing on trees in forests.
