= Tinissa phrictodes =

Scientific classification
- Kingdom: Animalia
- Phylum: Arthropoda
- Clade: Pancrustacea
- Class: Insecta
- Order: Lepidoptera
- Family: Tineidae
- Genus: Tinissa
- Species: T. phrictodes

Binomial name
- Tinissa phrictodes Meyrick, 1910

Species of moth

Tinissa phrictodes is a moth of the family Tineidae. It was described by Edward Meyrick in 1910. It is found on the Solomon Islands.
