= Tinissa yaloma =

Scientific classification
- Kingdom: Animalia
- Phylum: Arthropoda
- Clade: Pancrustacea
- Class: Insecta
- Order: Lepidoptera
- Family: Tineidae
- Genus: Tinissa
- Species: T. yaloma

Binomial name
- Tinissa yaloma Robinson, 1981

Species of moth

Tinissa yaloma is a moth of the family Tineidae. It was described by Robinson in 1981. It is found in New Britain.
