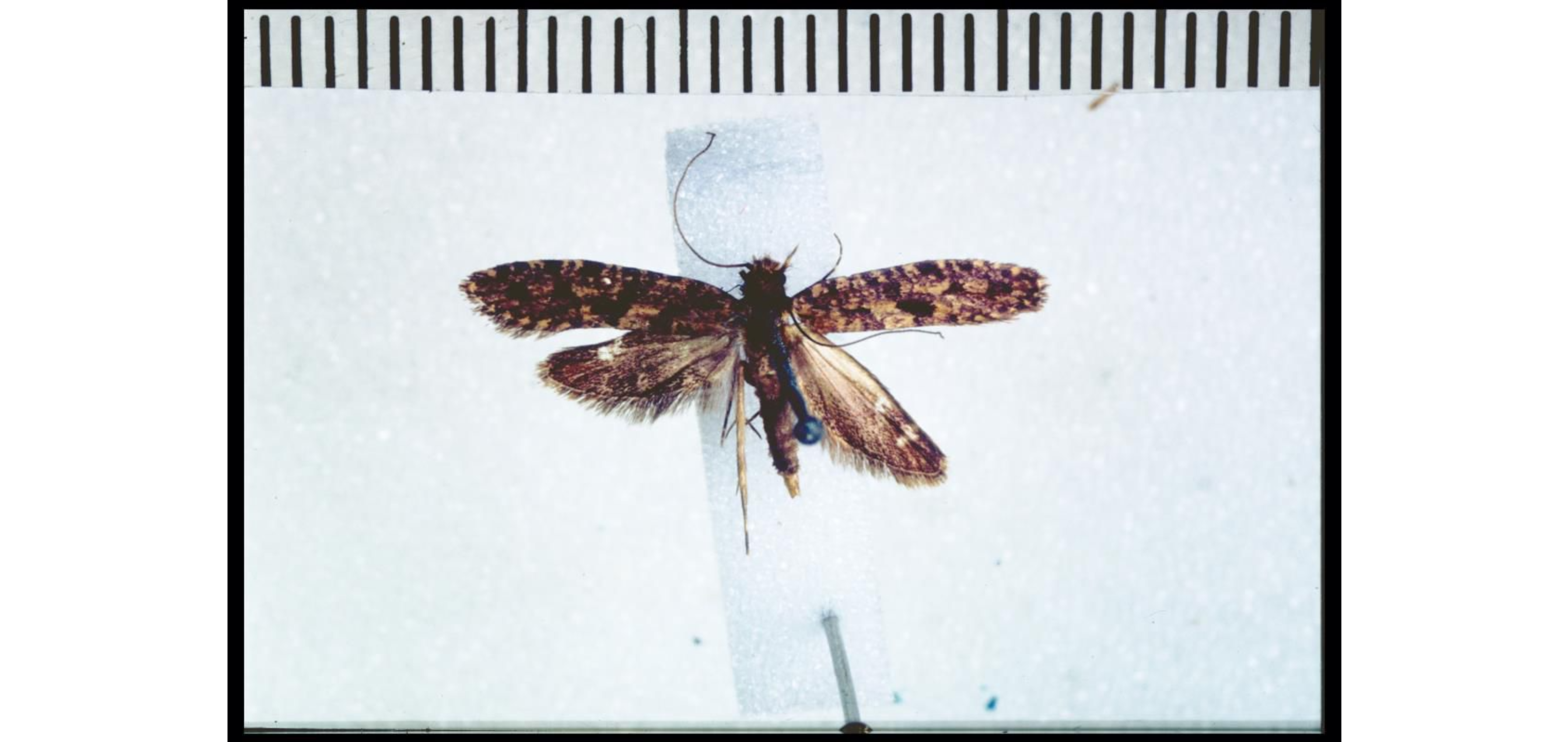
- Holotype specimen

Conservation status
- Data Deficit (NZ TCS)

Scientific classification
- Kingdom: Animalia
- Phylum: Arthropoda
- Clade: Pancrustacea
- Class: Insecta
- Order: Lepidoptera
- Family: Tineidae
- Genus: Archyala
- Species: A. opulenta

Binomial name
- Archyala opulenta Philpott, 1926

= Archyala opulenta =

Species of moth endemic to New Zealand

Archyala opulenta is a species of moth of the family Tineidae. This species is endemic to New Zealand and has been found in the upper Maitai Valley in Nelson as well as in Northland. The larvae of this species are associated with endemic bat species as they feed on the guano of Mystacinidae. The adult moths are on the wing in November. It is classified as "Data Deficient" under the New Zealand Threat Classification System by the Department of Conservation.

== Taxonomy ==
This species was described by Alfred Philpott in 1926 from specimens collected in the upper Maitai Valley in Nelson by E. S. Gourlay in November. George Hudson, in 1928 discussed this species as a synonym of A. terranea. However, in 1927 Philpott had shown a diagnostic difference between these two species when he illustrated the male genitalia of A. opulenta. The holotype specimen is held at the New Zealand Arthropod Collection.

== Description ==
Philpott described this species as follows:

♂. 17–19 mm. Head and palpi ochreous mixed with fuscous. Antennae fuscous. Thorax dark fuscous mixed with ochreous. Abdomen dark greyish-fuscous. Legs fuscous mixed with ochreous. Forewings elongate, costa strongly arched, apex round-pointed, termen rounded, very oblique; ochreous; numerous dark purplish-fuscous outwardly-oblique interrupted strigae, most prominent on costa; a broader and more continuous one from 2/3 costa to 3/4 dorsum; a series of ochreous spots round termen: fringes fuscous mixed with ochreous. Hindwings fuscous with purplish-violet reflections: fringes dark fuscous.

== Distribution ==
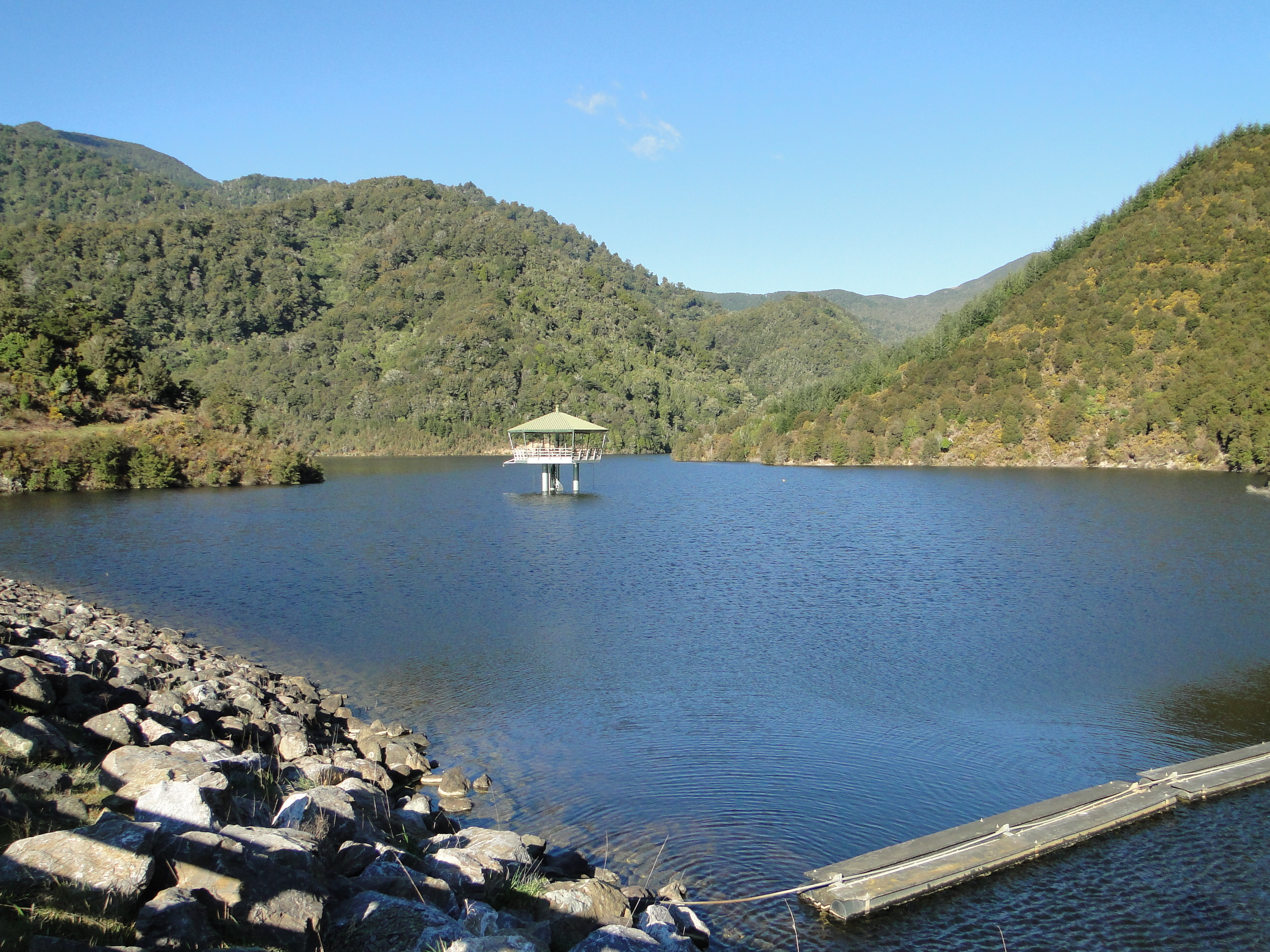
Maitai Valley, type locality of A. opulenta

It is endemic to New Zealand. This species has been found in Nelson and Northland.

== Biology and ecology ==
This species was first collected in the bush. This species is a known associate of bat colonies as its larva feeds on the guano of Mystacinidae. The adult moth is on the wing in November.

== Conservation status ==
In 2025 this species was classified by the New Zealand Department of Conservation as "data deficient" under the New Zealand Threat Classification System.
