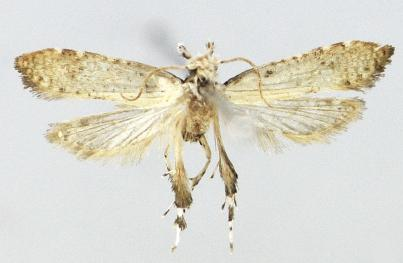
- Tinissa connata

Scientific classification
- Kingdom: Animalia
- Phylum: Arthropoda
- Clade: Pancrustacea
- Class: Insecta
- Order: Lepidoptera
- Family: Tineidae
- Subfamily: Scardiinae
- Genus: Tinissa; Walker, 1864

Type species
- Tinissa torvella Walker, 1864

Diversity
- >30 species

Synonyms
- Polymnestra Meyrick, 1927

= Tinissa =

Genus of moths

Tinissa is a genus of the fungus moth family (Tineidae). Therein, it belongs to the subfamily Scardiinae.

== Species ==
- Tinissa albipuncta Robinson, 1976
- Tinissa amboinensis Robinson, 1976
- Tinissa apicimaculata Yang & Li, 2012
- Tinissa araucariae Robinson, 1976
- Tinissa bakeri Robinson, 1976
- Tinissa baliomicta Meyrick, 1928
- Tinissa chalcites Robinson, 1976
- Tinissa chaotica Robinson, 1976
- Tinissa cinerascens Meyrick, 1910
- Tinissa classeyi Robinson, 1981
- Tinissa conchata Yang & Li, 2012
- Tinissa connata Yang & Li, 2012
- Tinissa convoluta Robinson, 1976
- Tinissa cultellata Gozmány & Vári, 1973
- Tinissa distracta Meyrick, 1916
- Tinissa dohertyi Robinson, 1976
- Tinissa errantia Robinson, 1976
- Tinissa eumetrota Meyrick, 1926
- Tinissa goliath Robinson, 1976
- Tinissa indica Robinson, 1976
- Tinissa insignis Zagulajev, 1972
- Tinissa insularia Robinson, 1976
- Tinissa kidukaroka Robinson, 1976
- Tinissa krakatoa Robinson, 1976
- Tinissa leguminella Yang & Li, 2012
- Tinissa mysorensis Robinson, 1976
- Tinissa palmodes Meyrick, 1917
- Tinissa parallela Robinson, 1976
- Tinissa philippinensis Robinson, 1976
- Tinissa phrictodes Meyrick, 1910
- Tinissa poliophasma Bradley, 1965
- Tinissa polysema Zagulajev, 1972
- Tinissa polystacta (Meyrick, 1918) (=Polymnestra perilithas Meyrick, 1927)
- Tinissa rigida Meyrick, 1910 (= Tinissa chloroplocama Meyrick, 1938, Tinissa heterograpta Meyrick, 1928)
- Tinissa ruwenzorica Gozmány, 1966
- Tinissa spaniastra Meyrick, 1932
- Tinissa spirella Yang & Li, 2012
- Tinissa torvella Walker, 1864
- Tinissa transversella (Walker, 1864)
- Tinissa wayfoongi Robinson & Tuck, 1998
- Tinissa yaloma Robinson, 1981
