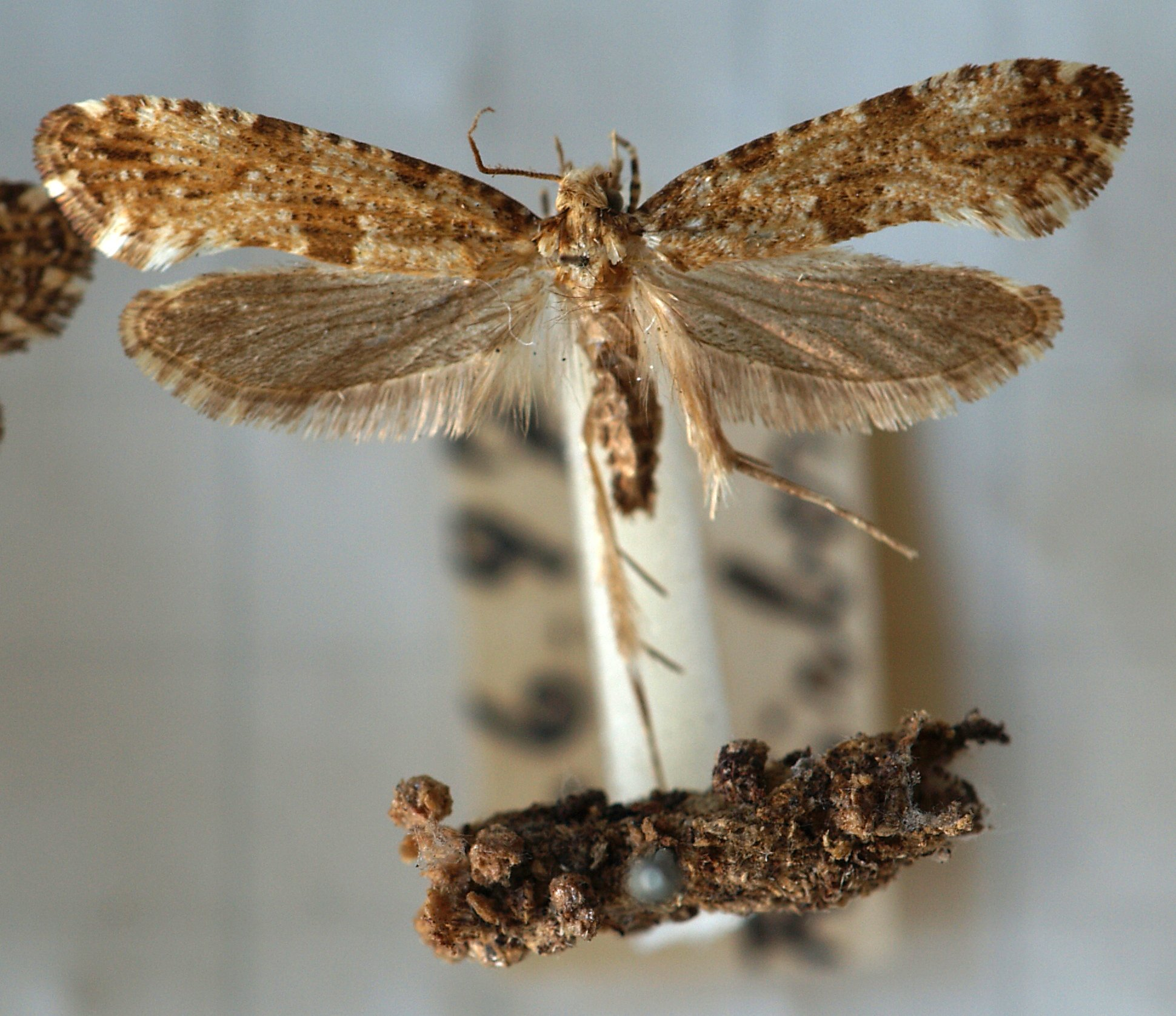

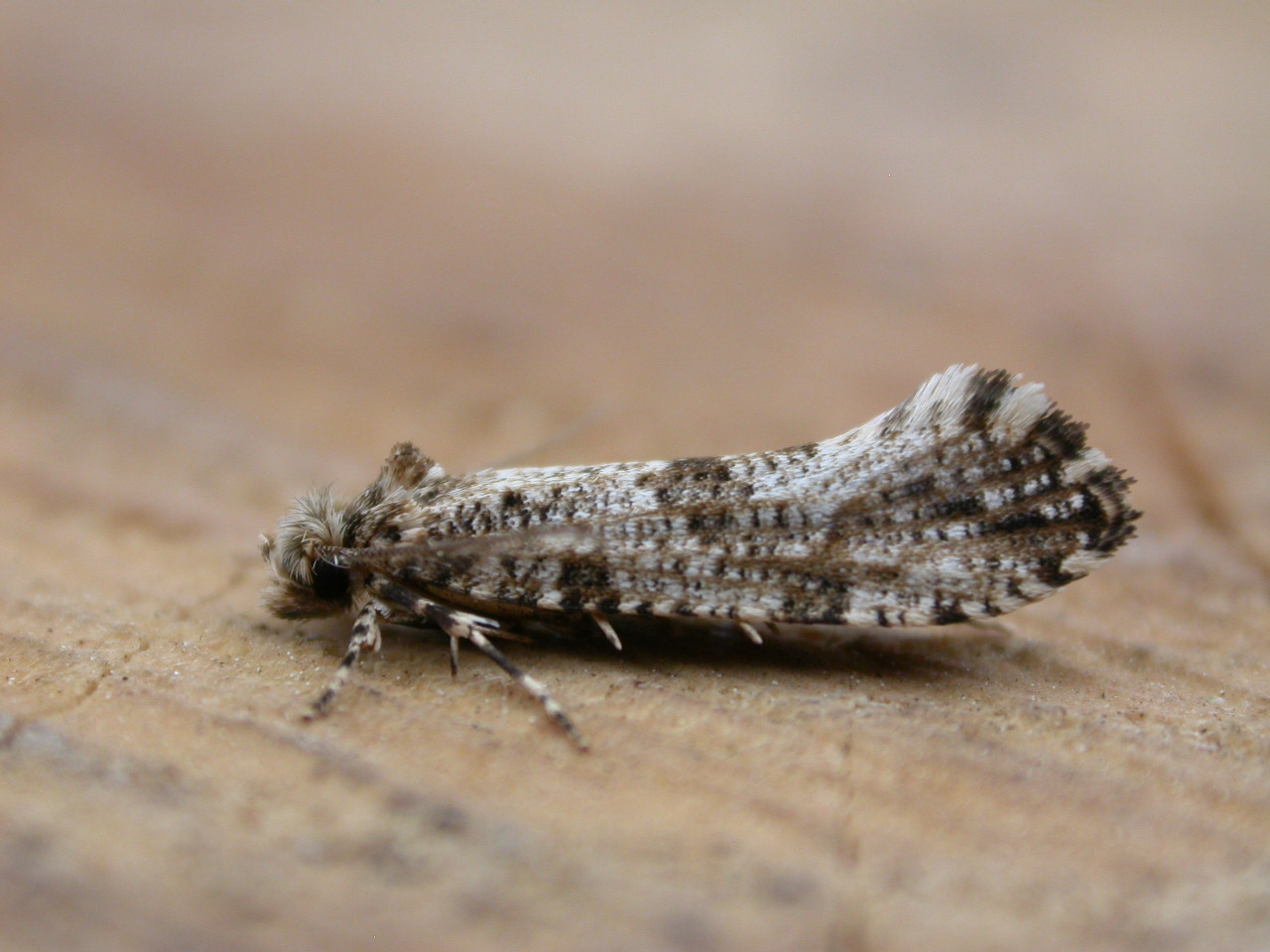

Scientific classification
- Kingdom: Animalia
- Phylum: Arthropoda
- Class: Insecta
- Order: Lepidoptera
- Family: Tineidae
- Genus: Morophaga
- Species: M. choragella

Binomial name
- Morophaga choragella Denis & Schiffermüller, 1775

Synonyms
- Morophaga boleti

= Morophaga choragella =

Species of moth

Morophaga choragella is a moth of the family Tineidae. It is found in Europe.

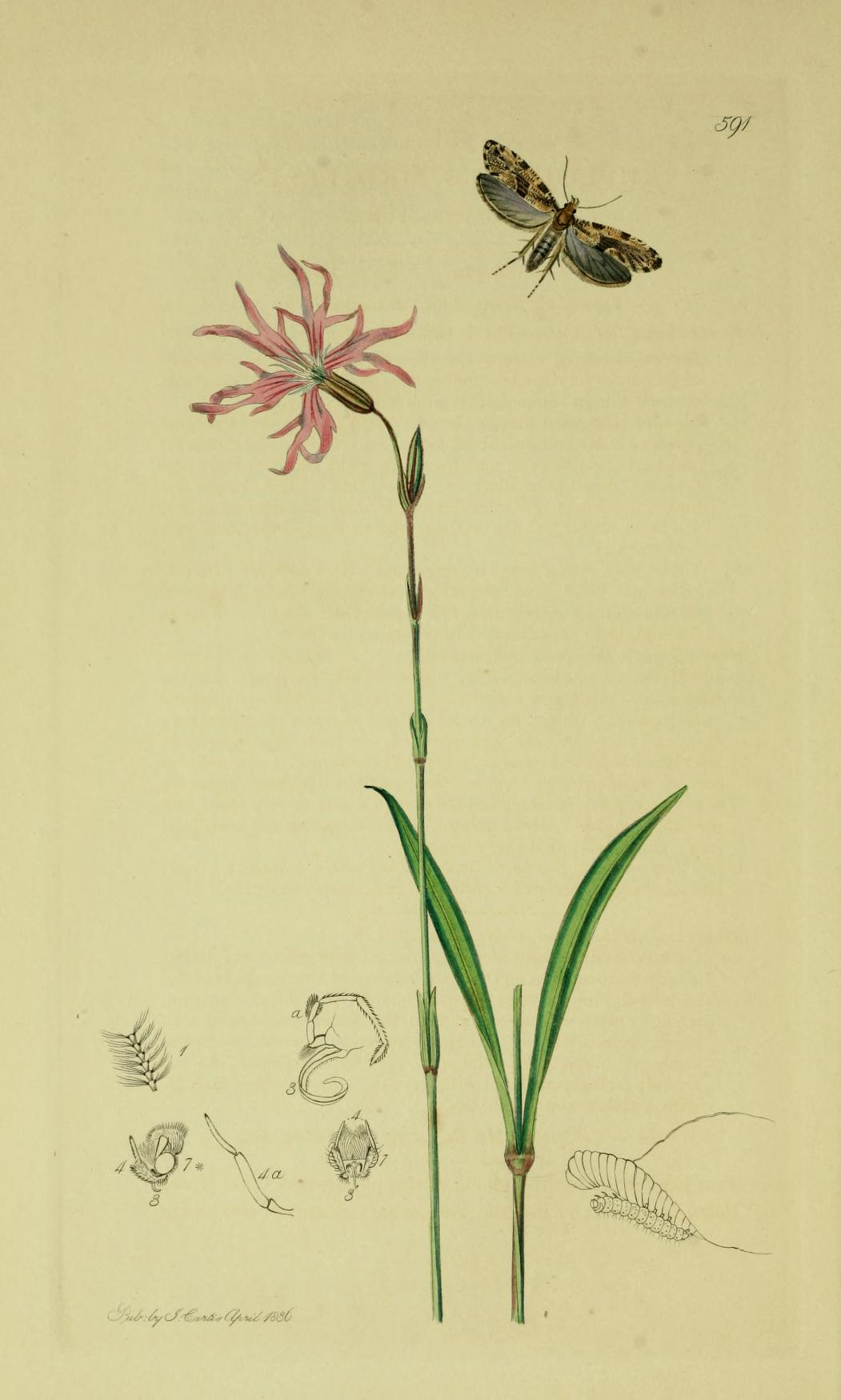
Illustration from John Curtis's British Entomology Volume 6

== Description ==
The wingspan is 18–32 mm. It is a brown-speckled moths. The antennae are wire-shaped and a little over half as long as the forewings. The head is covered with short, grey-brown, hair-like scales. The thorax is brown with lighter sides. The forewings are rounded, the base color is yellow-brown with darker markings, also some small, white spots. In the middle of the wing there is a comma-shaped, darker spot from the back edge, this is edged with white. The forewing has fringes of dark grey-brown with a narrow, light middle stripe and four narrow, white fields. The hind wing is grey, with short hair fringes that are light grey with a darker band in the middle. The larva is dirty yellowish white with a dark brown head.

== Biology ==
The moth flies from May to September.

The larvae feed on mushrooms, particularly Piptoporus betulinus and Ganoderma applanatum, and dead wood.
