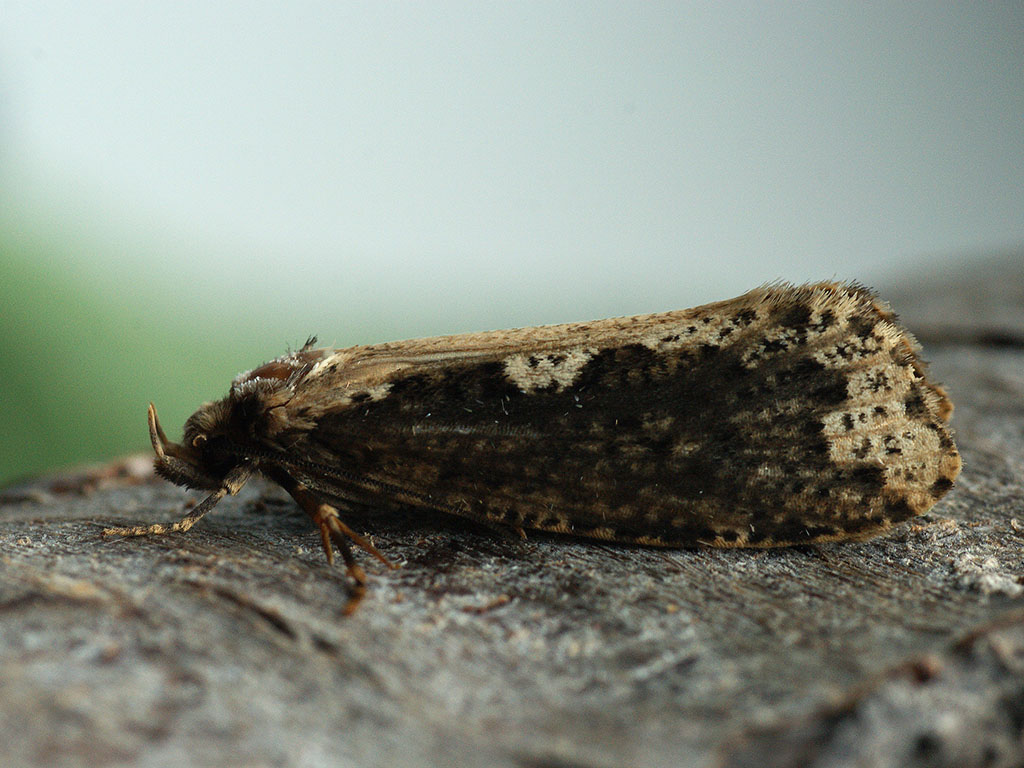

Scientific classification
- Kingdom: Animalia
- Phylum: Arthropoda
- Class: Insecta
- Order: Lepidoptera
- Family: Tineidae
- Genus: Scardia
- Species: S. boletella

Binomial name
- Scardia boletella (Fabricius, 1794)

= Scardia boletella =

Species of moth

Scardia boletella is a moth, belonging to the family Tineidae. The species was first described by Johan Christian Fabricius in 1794.

It is native to Europe.
