= Tinissa poliophasma =

Scientific classification
- Kingdom: Animalia
- Phylum: Arthropoda
- Clade: Pancrustacea
- Class: Insecta
- Order: Lepidoptera
- Family: Tineidae
- Genus: Tinissa
- Species: T. poliophasma

Binomial name
- Tinissa poliophasma Bradley, 1965

Species of moth

Tinissa poliophasma is a moth of the family Tineidae. It was described by John David Bradley in 1965 and is found in Uganda.
