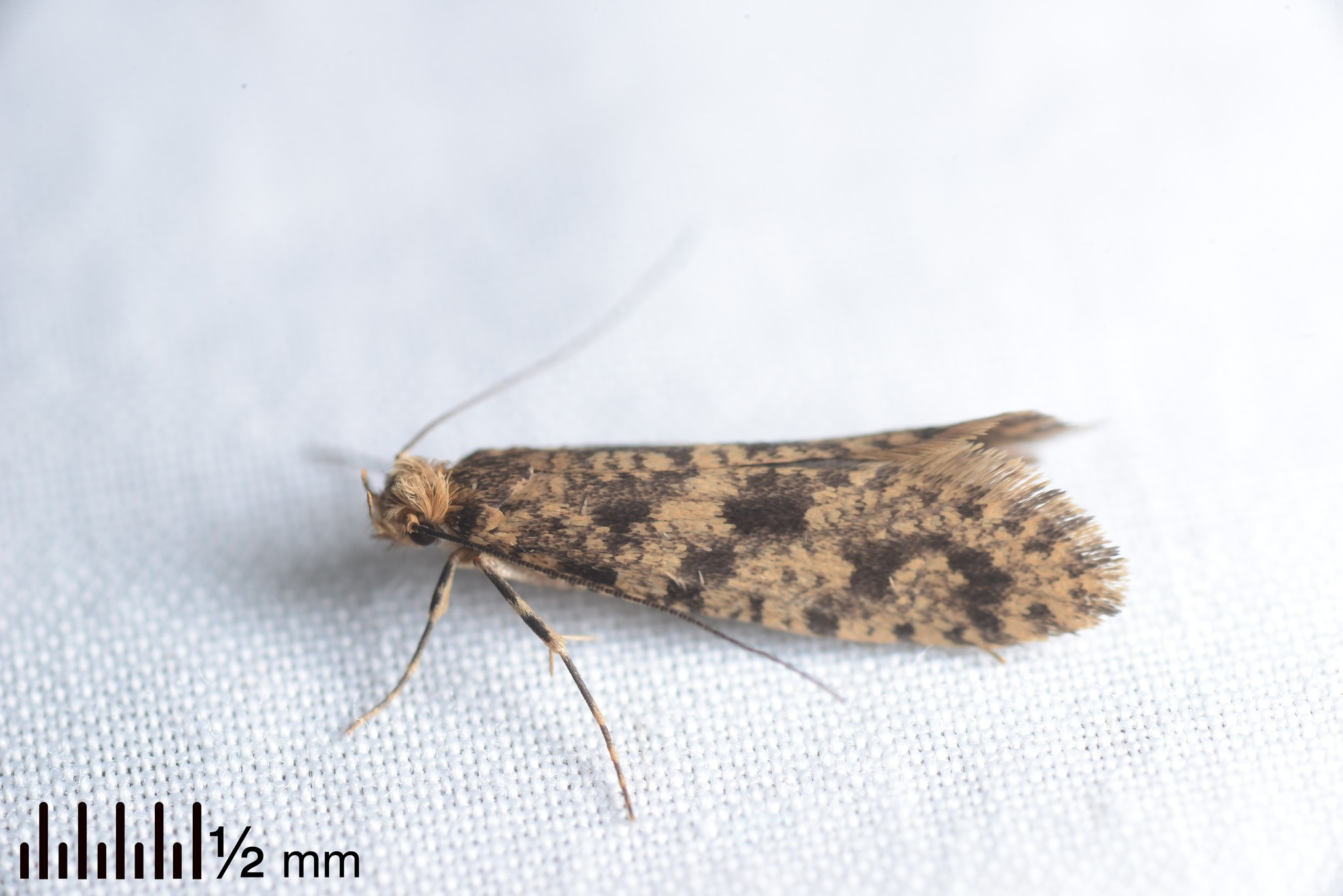

Scientific classification
- Kingdom: Animalia
- Phylum: Arthropoda
- Clade: Pancrustacea
- Class: Insecta
- Order: Lepidoptera
- Family: Tineidae
- Genus: Archyala
- Species: A. terranea

Binomial name
- Archyala terranea (Butler, 1879)

Synonyms
- Scardia terranea Butler, 1879; Tinea terranea Butler, 1879

= Archyala terranea =

Species of moth endemic to New Zealand

Archyala terranea is a species of moth in the family Tineidae. It was first described by Arthur Gardiner Butler in 1879. This species is endemic to New Zealand and can be found in the North, South and Chatham Islands. Larvae feed on moss on rocks and pupate amongst that moss in rough, dense cocoons. Adults are observed on the wing most commonly from November to March. They are attracted to light but have be observed flying in during the day. This moth has been observed infesting grain storage facilities.

== Taxonomy ==
This species was first described by Arthur Gardiner Butler in 1879 and originally named it Tinea terranea. In 1888 Edward Meyrick again described this moth and placed it in the genus Tinea. In 1915 Meyrick placed this species in the genus Archyala. George Hudson discussed and illustrated this species in his 1928 book The butterflies and moths of New Zealand also under the name Archyala terranea. Hudson also discussed A. opulenta as a synonym of A. terranea. However in 1927, prior to the publication of Hudson's book, Alfred Philpott examined the genitalia of the male of this species and distinguishing it from A. opulenta. The female holotype, collected by F. W. Hutton in Otago, is held at the Natural History Museum, London.

== Description ==
A. terranea at rest.

Hudson described this species as follows:

The expansion of the wings is about 1 inch. The head is densely clothed with long reddish-ochreous hairs. The fore-wings are elongate-elliptical with the apex rather blunt and the termen very obliquely rounded; golden ochreous, thickly dotted with blackish-bnown spots; there is a series of larger spots along the costa and termen; two large spots placed obliquely in the disc at about 1/3 and two irregular spots beyond these. The hindwings are brownish-grey, strewn with golden scales, and with strong purple reflections.

The adults of this species have been confused with A. opulenta. This species is slightly variable in colouring and also in the extent and depth of the blackish spots on the forewings. The male of the species is usually darker and somewhat smaller than the females. Adults can also be confused with the brown house moth Hofiannophila pseudospretella. However A. terranea have a more dramatic curve to their forewings and the edges of those forewings have a series of spots that H. pseudospretella lack.

== Distribution ==
A. terranea is endemic to New Zealand and has been observed in the North, South, and the Chatham Islands.

== Habitat and hosts ==
Larvae are said to feed in moss on rocks. However adults have been reared from detritus and feathers, but no host was confirmed as at 2011.

== Behaviour ==
The larvae of this species pupate amongst moss in a rough, dense cocoon. Adults are attracted to light, are commonly on the wing from November until March and have been collected via a mercury vapour light trap. Hudson states that the adults have been observed flying in a "mazy" manner during the late afternoon in October and November. Hudson also pointed out that adults had been observed resting on fence palings and on the walls of outbuildings and hypothesised that the species had acquiring semi-domestic habits.

== Interactions with humans ==
An infestation of adults, pupae and larvae of this species have been found inside buildings housing a grain silo with damp grain as well as at a flour mill.
