= Tinissa amboinensis =

Scientific classification
- Kingdom: Animalia
- Phylum: Arthropoda
- Clade: Pancrustacea
- Class: Insecta
- Order: Lepidoptera
- Family: Tineidae
- Genus: Tinissa
- Species: T. amboinensis

Binomial name
- Tinissa amboinensis Robinson, 1976

Species of moth

Tinissa amboinensis is a moth of the family Tineidae. It was described by Robinson in 1976. It is found in Indonesia (Ambon).
