= Cnismorectis =

Scientific classification
- Kingdom: Animalia
- Phylum: Arthropoda
- Clade: Pancrustacea
- Class: Insecta
- Order: Lepidoptera
- Family: Tineidae
- Genus: Cnismorectis; Meyrick, 1936

Genus of moths

Cnismorectis is a genus of moths belonging to the family Tineidae.

== Species ==
- Cnismorectis choritica Meyrick, 1936 (from Bolivia)

This species has a wingspan of 25-35 mm for the female.
