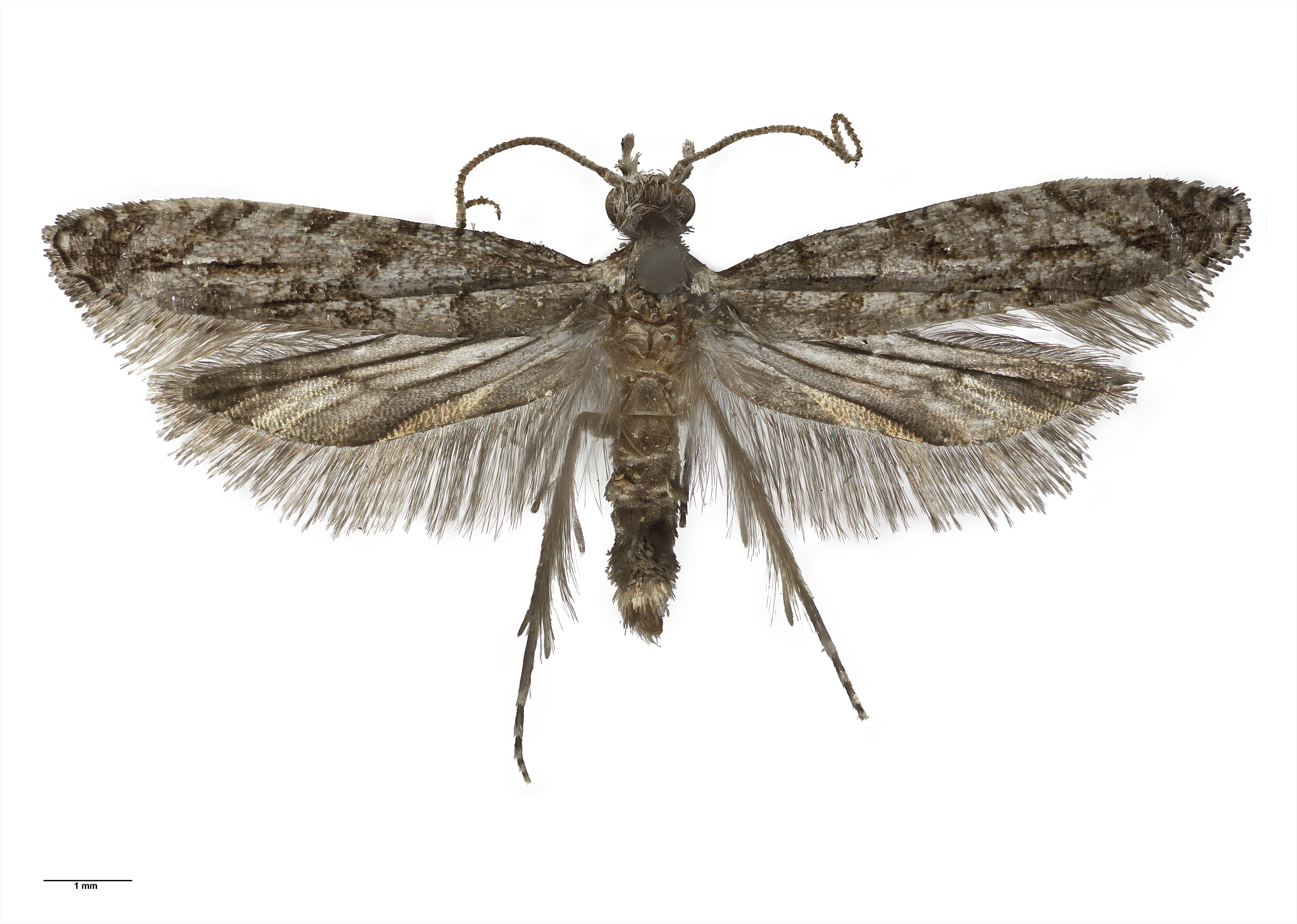
- Holotype of A. tigrina.

Scientific classification
- Kingdom: Animalia
- Phylum: Arthropoda
- Clade: Pancrustacea
- Class: Insecta
- Order: Lepidoptera
- Family: Tineidae
- Genus: Archyala
- Species: A. paraglypta

Binomial name
- Archyala paraglypta Meyrick, 1889

Synonyms
- Archyala tigrina Philpott, 1930

= Archyala paraglypta =

Species of moth endemic to New Zealand

Archyala paraglypta is a species of moth in the family Tineidae first described by Edward Meyrick in 1889. It is endemic to New Zealand.

== Taxonomy ==
This species was first described by Edward Meyrick in 1889. In 1930 Alfred Philpott, thinking he was describing a new species, named this moth Archyala tigrina. The male holotype, collected at Riccarton Bush, is held at the Natural History Museum, London.

== Description ==
Illustration of male.

Living specimen.

Meyrick described this species as follows:

♂. 16mm. Head fuscous-whitish, more fuscous between antennae. Palpi dark fuscous, terminal joint whitish. Antennae fuscous. Thorax fuscous, posteriorly mixed with whitish. Abdomen fuscous. Anterior legs dark fuscous ringed with whitish, middle legs ochreous-white banded with black, posterior legs ochreous-whitish banded with fuscous. Fore wings very elongate, narrow, costa moderately arched, apex round-pointed, hindmargin extremely obliquely rounded ; white, irregularly transversely strigulated with grey, and more or less suffused with pale brownish-ochreous except towards inner margin and base, and on costal edge ; numerous irregular incomplete transverse dark fuscous strigulae, tending to partially coalesce in pairs : cilia grey-whitish, base white, round apex with a black median line and barred with fuscous. Hindwings bronzy-fuscous ; cilia whitish-grey.

== Distribution ==
This species is endemic to New Zealand.
