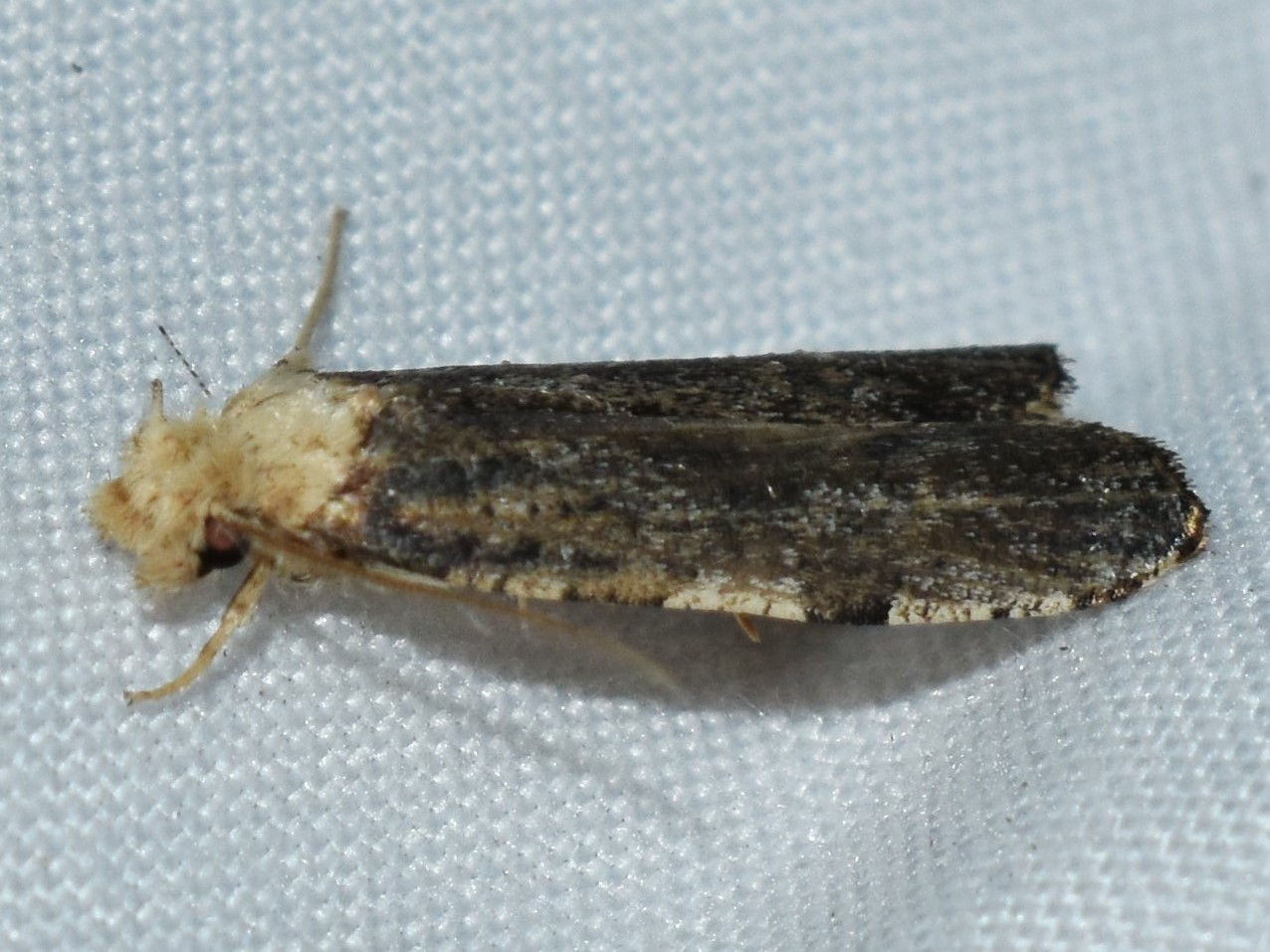
- Diataga leptosceles

Scientific classification
- Kingdom: Animalia
- Phylum: Arthropoda
- Clade: Pancrustacea
- Class: Insecta
- Order: Lepidoptera
- Family: Tineidae
- Genus: Diataga; Walsingham, 1914

Type species
- Diataga leptosceles Walsingham, 1914

= Diataga =

Genus of moths

Diataga is a genus of moths in the family Tineidae.

== Species ==
- Diataga brasiliensis (Zagulajev, 1966) - Brazil (Rio Grande do Sul)
- Diataga leptosceles Walsingham, 1914 - Mexico to Brazil
- Diataga frustraminis Robinson, 1986 - French Guiana and Brazil
- Diataga mercennaria Robinson, 1986 - Trinidad; French Guiana
- Diataga compsacma Meyrick, 1919 - Guyana
- Diataga levidensis Robinson, 1986 - Peru
- Diataga direpta Robinson, 1986 - Argentina
