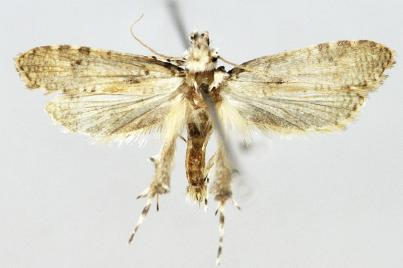

Scientific classification
- Kingdom: Animalia
- Phylum: Arthropoda
- Clade: Pancrustacea
- Class: Insecta
- Order: Lepidoptera
- Family: Tineidae
- Genus: Tinissa
- Species: T. conchata

Binomial name
- Tinissa conchata Yang & Li, 2012

= Tinissa conchata =

Species of moth

Tinissa conchata is a moth of the family Tineidae. It is found in China (Fujian, Guangdong and Guangxi).

The wingspan is 16−20 mm for males and about 22 mm for females. The forewings have a yellowish white to yellowish brown ground color, with a bluish violet sheen and scattered inconspicuous, transverse, fine grayish brown striae. The hindwings are pale grayish brown, shining bluish violet.

== Etymology ==
The specific name is derived from the Latin conchatus (meaning conchoidal) and refers to the scallop-shaped distal half of the juxta.
