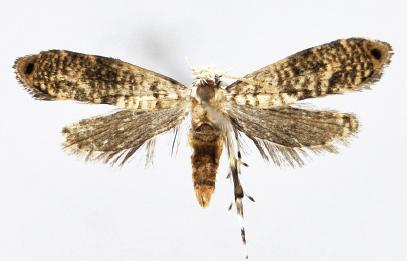

Scientific classification
- Kingdom: Animalia
- Phylum: Arthropoda
- Clade: Pancrustacea
- Class: Insecta
- Order: Lepidoptera
- Family: Tineidae
- Genus: Tinissa
- Species: T. apicimaculata

Binomial name
- Tinissa apicimaculata Yang & Li, 2012

= Tinissa apicimaculata =

Species of moth

Tinissa apicimaculata is a moth of the family Tineidae. It is found in Guangxi, China.

The wingspan is about 12 mm for females. The forewings have a creamy white ground color on the basal 1/3 and a yellowish brown ground color on the distal 2/3, becoming gradually darker toward the apex. The hindwings are grayish brown, but yellowish brown near the apex.

== Etymology ==
The specific name is derived from the Latin prefix apici- (meaning apex) and maculatus (meaning macula) and refers to the ovate, blackish brown spot near apex of forewing.
