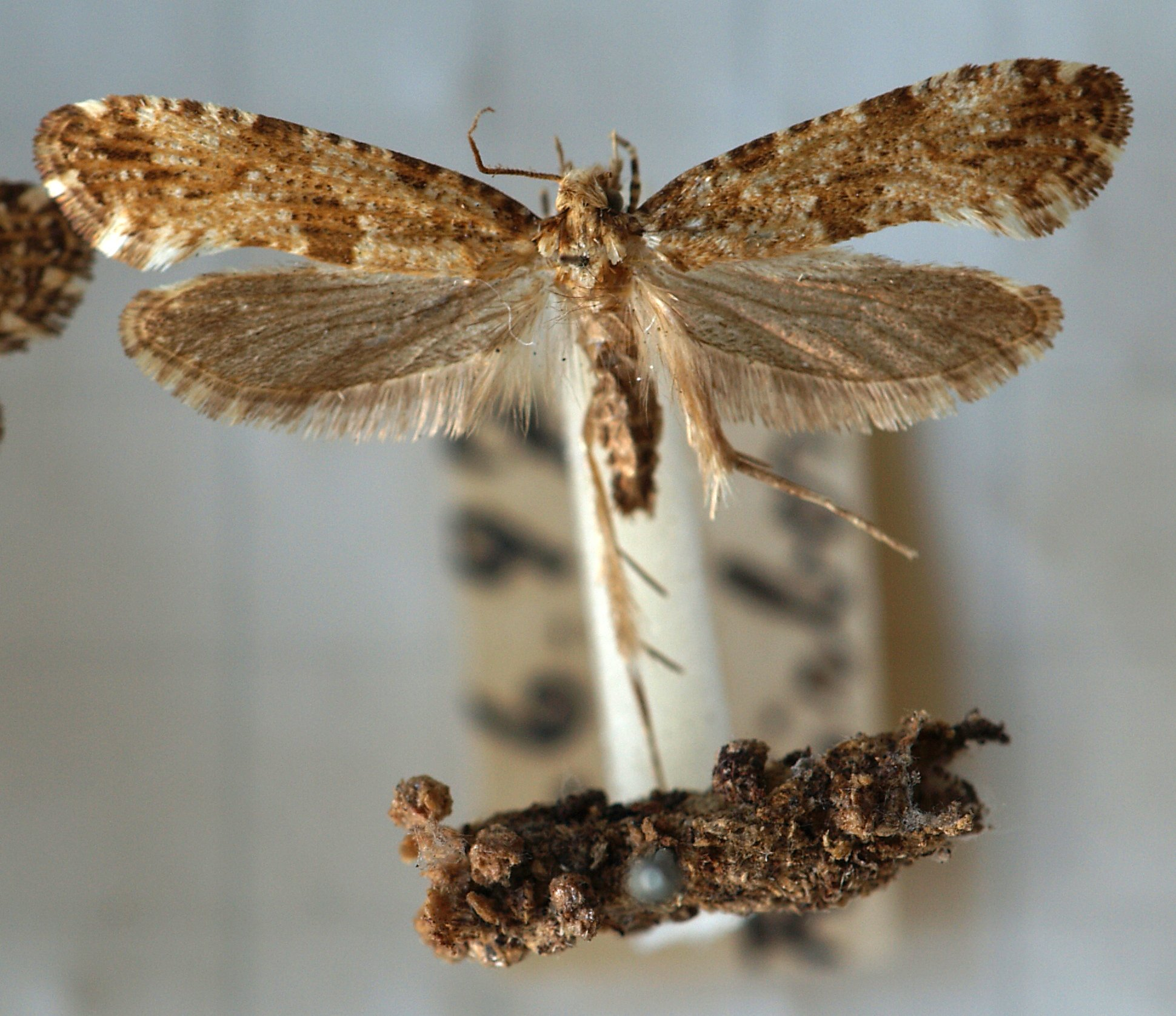
- Morophaga boleti

Scientific classification
- Kingdom: Animalia
- Phylum: Arthropoda
- Class: Insecta
- Order: Lepidoptera
- Family: Tineidae
- Genus: Morophaga; Herrich-Schaffer, 1853

= Morophaga =

Genus of moths

Morophaga is a genus of moths belonging to the family Tineidae.

The genus has almost cosmopolitan distribution.

Species:

- Morophaga borneensis Robinson, 1986 (Sabah)
- Morophaga bucephala (Snellen, 1884) (Korea)
- Morophaga choragella (Denis & Schiffermüller, 1775) (palearctic)
- Morophaga clonodes (Meyrick, 1893) (Australia)
- Morophaga cremnarcha (Meyrick, 1932) (Asia)
- Morophaga fasciculata
- Morophaga formosana Robinson, 1986 (Hongkong, Taiwan)
- Morophaga hyrcanella
- Morophaga iriomotensis
- Morophaga kurenzovi (Zagulajev, 1966)
- Morophaga morellus (Duponchel, 1838) (palearctic)
- Morophaga moriutii Robinson, 1986
- Morophaga plana Osada & Hirowatari, 2016 (Japan)
- Morophaga sistrata
- Morophaga soror
- Morophaga vadonella
