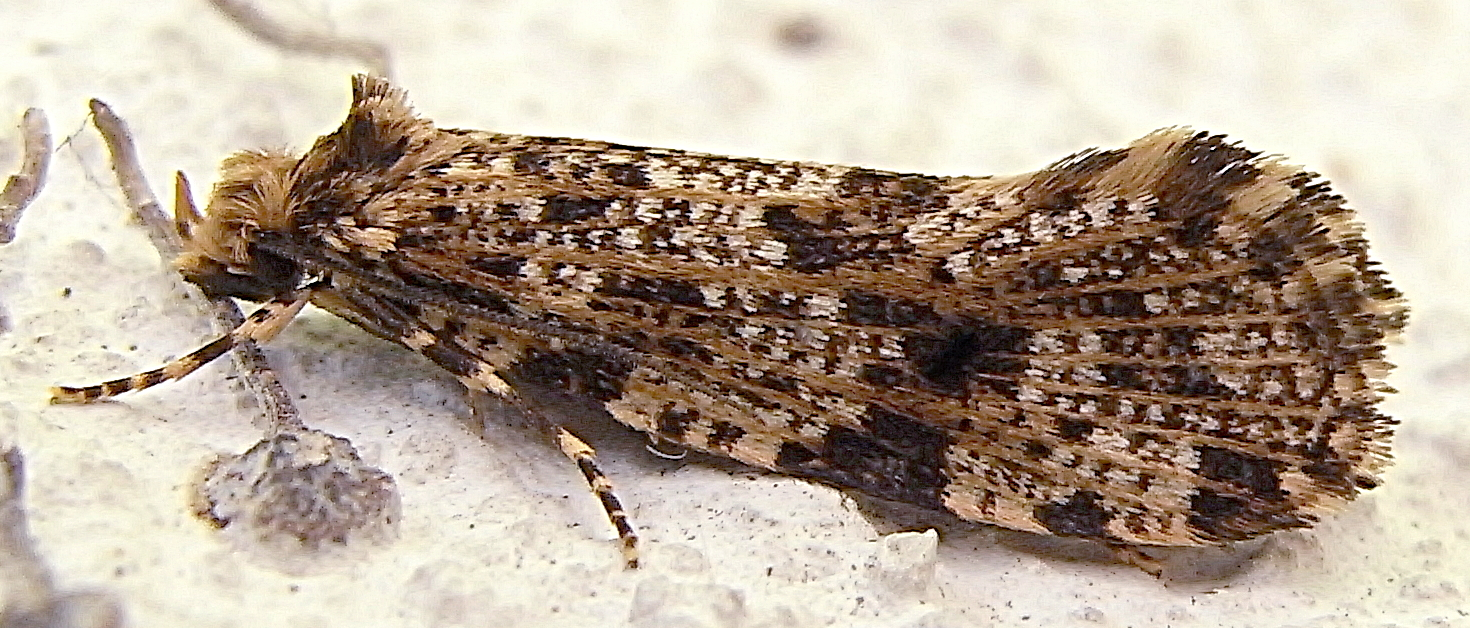
- Montescardia tessulatellus

Scientific classification
- Kingdom: Animalia
- Phylum: Arthropoda
- Class: Insecta
- Order: Lepidoptera
- Family: Tineidae
- Genus: Montescardia; Amsel, 1952

= Montescardia =

Genus of moths

Montescardia is a genus of moths belonging to the family Tineidae.

The species of this genus are found in Europe and Northern America.

Species:

- Montescardia fuscofasciella (Chambers, 1875)
- Montescardia kurenzovi (Zagulajev, 1966)
- Montescardia tessulatellus (Zeller, 1846)
