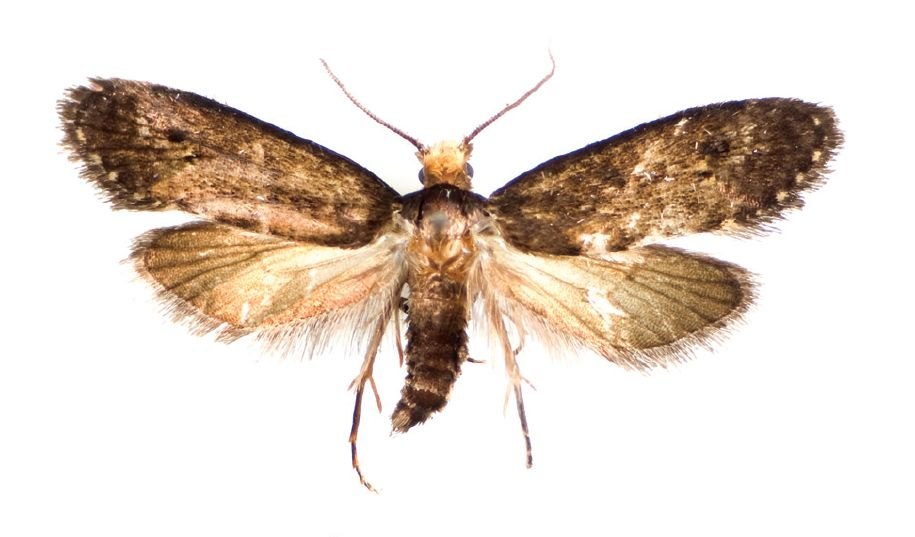
- Pelecystola nearctica

Scientific classification
- Kingdom: Animalia
- Phylum: Arthropoda
- Clade: Pancrustacea
- Class: Insecta
- Order: Lepidoptera
- Family: Tineidae
- Genus: Pelecystola; Meyrick, 1920

Synonyms
- Zularcha Meyrick, 1937; Neurozestis Meyrick, 1938

= Pelecystola =

Genus of moths

Pelecystola is a genus of moths belonging to the family Tineidae.

== Species ==
- Pelecystola decorata Meyrick, 1920
- Pelecystola fraudulentella (Zeller, 1852)
- Pelecystola melanchares (Meyrick, 1937)
- Pelecystola nearctica S. Davis & D. Davis, 2009
- Pelecystola polysticha (Meyrick, 1938)
- Pelecystola strigosa (Moore, 1888) (= Euplocamus hierophanta Meyrick, 1916 and Semioscopis maculella Matsumura, 1931)
- Pelecystola tephrinitis (Meyrick, 1912)
