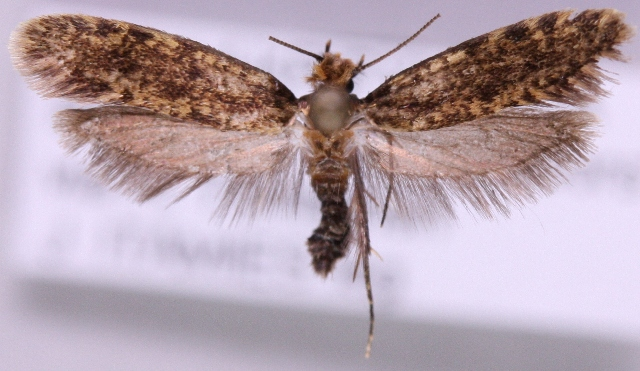
- Haplotinea ditella

Scientific classification
- Kingdom: Animalia
- Phylum: Arthropoda
- Clade: Pancrustacea
- Class: Insecta
- Order: Lepidoptera
- Family: Tineidae
- Subfamily: Perissomasticinae; Gozmány, 1965

Type genus
- Perissomastix Warren & Rothschild, 1905

= Perissomasticinae =

Subfamily of moths

The Perissomasticinae are a subfamily of moth of the family Tineidae. They mostly have glossy, uniformly coloured or bicoulourd forewings and short labial palps.

== Genera ==
- Cylicobathra
- Ectabola
- Edosa
- Hyperbola
- Neoepiscardia
- Perissomastix
- Phalloscardia
- Theatrochora
