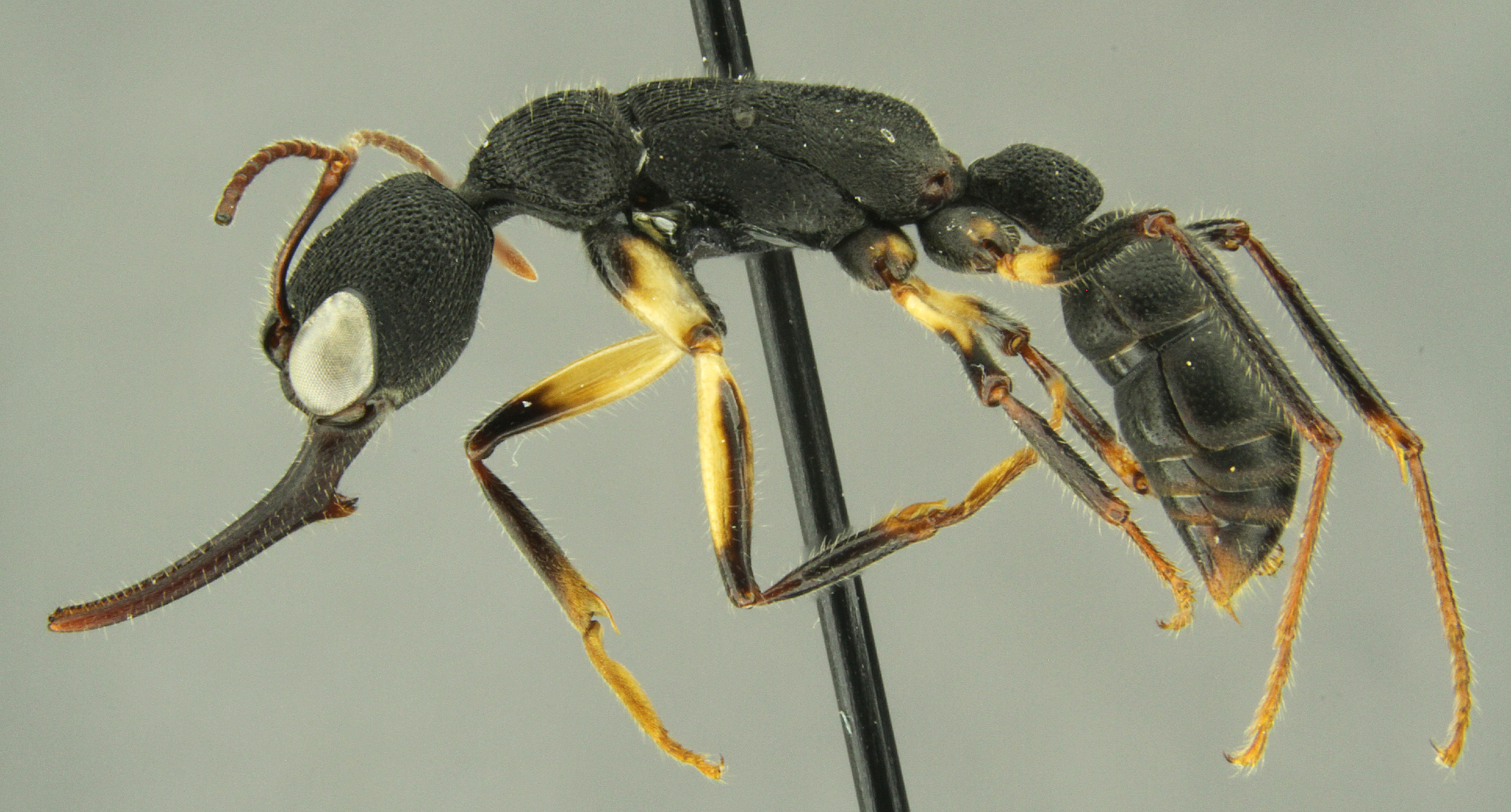
- H. alperti holotype worker

Scientific classification
- Kingdom: Animalia
- Phylum: Arthropoda
- Class: Insecta
- Order: Hymenoptera
- Family: Formicidae
- Subfamily: Ponerinae
- Tribe: Ponerini
- Genus: Harpegnathos
- Species: H. alperti

Binomial name
- Harpegnathos alperti General, 2016

= Harpegnathos alperti =

Indomalayan species of ant

Harpegnathos alperti is a ponerine species of ants found in the Indomalayan bioregion. The species is known from a single specimen collected in the Philippines and described in 2016.

== History and classification ==
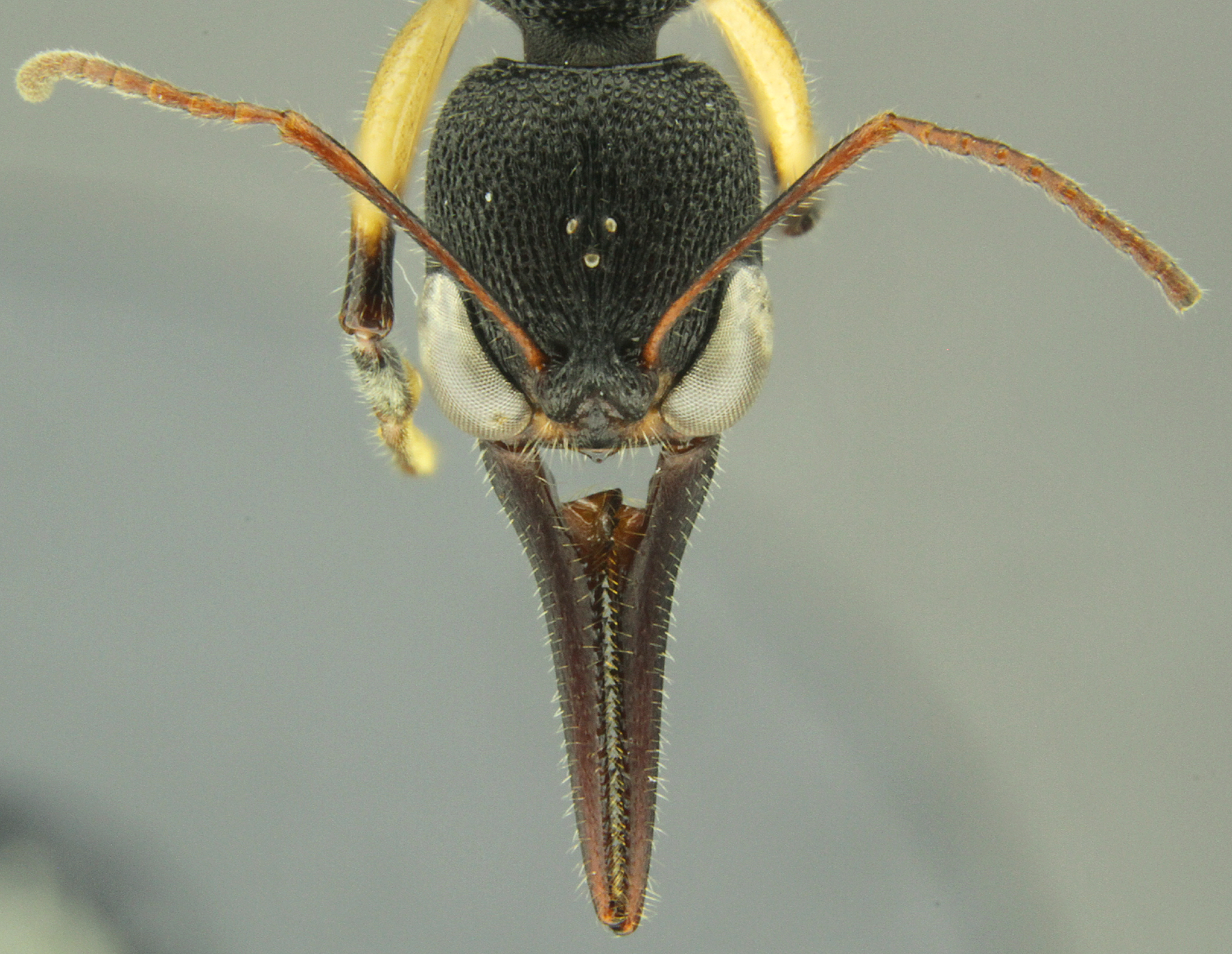
Closeup of the Harpegnathos alperti worker head

The type specimen was collected in 2003 from Panicuason Village located on Mt. Isarog about 18 km (18,000 m) east of Naga city, Luzon Island in the Philippines. The worker was officially described by myrmecologist David Emmanuel M. General of the University of the Philippines in a 2016 Halteres paper. The holotype was deposited into the National Museum of the Philippines collections as specimen #PNM13015, and to the Antweb.org database as #ANTWEB1008901. General coined the specific epithet as a patronym honoring entomologist Gary Alpert who acted as a mentor and friend.

In general aspect, General considered the species is similar to Harpegnathos venator chapmani in coloration, but with exoskeletal texturing more similar to Harpegnathos venator rugosus. However, due to being unable to locate the type specimen for H. v. chapmani in the American Museum of Natural History, Natural History Museum, London, Museum of Comparative Zoology or Smithsonian Institution collections, a direct and more detailed comparison of the two taxa was unable to be performed. The H. v. chapmani type worker was collected from Mount Makiling, with General noting the need for more extensive collecting to gather specimens of Luzon Harpegnathos and shed light on the natural biology of the genus on the island.

== Description ==
Overall the Harpegnathos alperti is 19.45 mm (0.766 in) long, with an overall black coloration to the body grading to patchy yellowish chocolate-brown on the leg while the mandibles and antennae are a darker chocolate. The head capsule is 2.55 mm (0.100 in) wide by 2.81 mm (0.111 in) long with a straight rear edge and large compound eyes placed slightly rearward of midpoint on each side. The head has a rugose texturing to the surface forming a reticulo-punctate pattering. The antennal bases are covered by the frontal lobes of the head capsule. Each antennae has sort erect to suberect hairs sparsely scattered along the scape which extends beyond the posterior margin. the mandibles are longer than the head capsule, being 3.54 mm (0.139 in) in length each. In profile the H. alperti thorax has an elongated cylindrical outline with a space between the front coxae and the middle plus hind coxae. The petiole is longer than high and has coarse punctation on both the sides and upper surface. The elongated gasters first and second tergites have fine background punctation overlain by larger and coarser punctations and the tip of the gaster sports a functional sting.

== Ecology ==
The holotype was trapped during the process of general insect collection on a Pterocarpus indicus ("narra") plantation with an understory consisting of Musa textilis Abacá banana. The plantation was at an elevation of 500–550 m (1,640–1,800 ft) in elevation.
