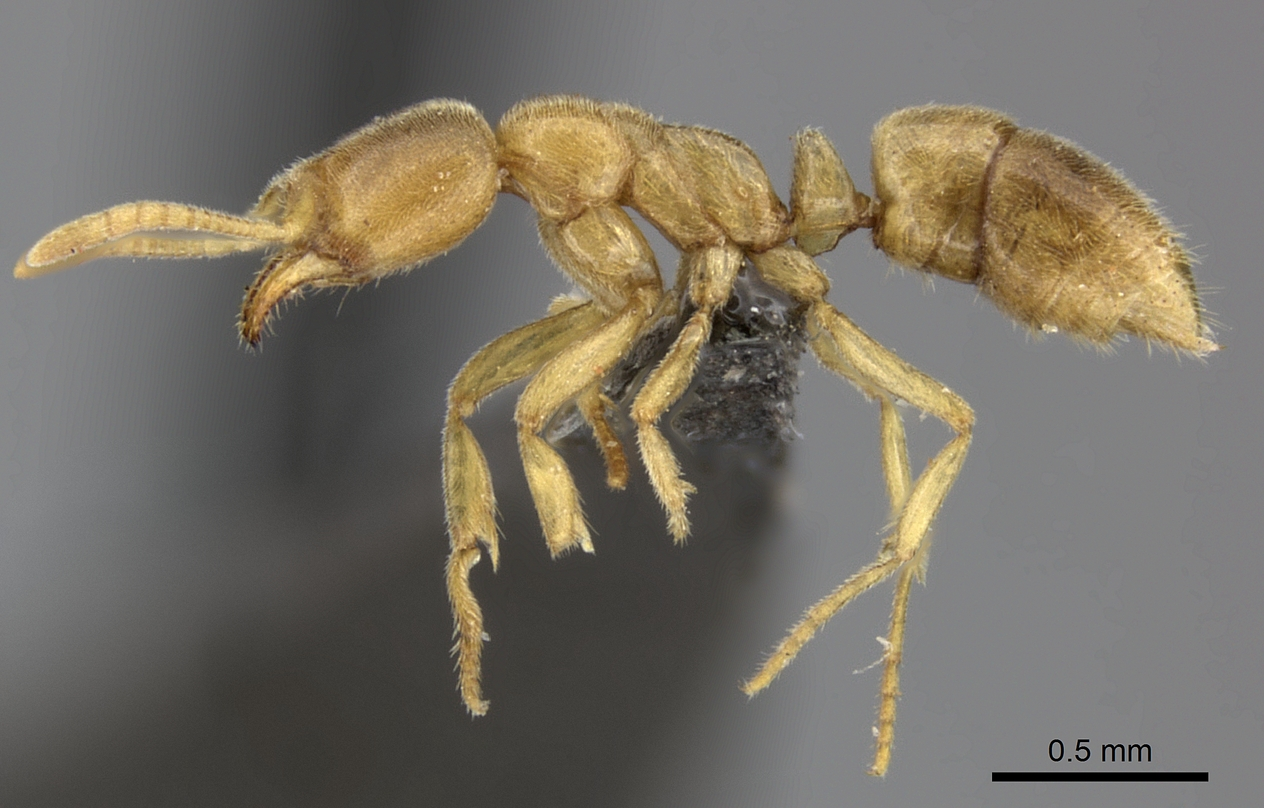
- Fisheropone ambigua AntWeb specimen

Scientific classification
- Kingdom: Animalia
- Phylum: Arthropoda
- Clade: Pancrustacea
- Class: Insecta
- Order: Hymenoptera
- Family: Formicidae
- Subfamily: Ponerinae
- Tribe: Ponerini
- Alliance: Odontomachus genus group
- Genus: Fisheropone; Schmidt & Shattuck, 2014

Type species
- Ponera ambigua Weber, 1942

Diversity
- 13 species

= Fisheropone =

Genus of ants

Fisheropone is a genus of ants in the subfamily Ponerinae. Known from sub-Saharan Africa and Madagascar, members of the genus are poorly known. The genus is named after myrmecologist Brian Fisher.

== Species ==
As of 2026, the genus contains 13 described species and at least one undescribed species. Ten species were transferred here from Euponera in 2025 after molecular phylogenetic analysis proved the latter polyphyletic.

=== Described ===
- Fisheropone aenigmatica (Arnold, 1949)
- Fisheropone ambigua (Weber, 1942)
- Fisheropone brunoi (Forel, 1913)
- Fisheropone fossigera (Mayr, 1901)
- Fisheropone hartwigi (Arnold, 1948)
- Fisheropone malayana (Wheeler, 1929)
- Fisheropone pallidipennis (Smith, 1860)
- Fisheropone pilosior (Wheeler, 1928)
- Fisheropone sakishimensis (Terayama, 1999)
- Fisheropone sharpi (Forel, 1901)
- Fisheropone tianzun (Terayama, 2009)
- Fisheropone tynara (Fisher, 2025)
- Fisheropone wroughtonii (Forel, 1901)

=== Undescribed ===
- Fisheropone afr02
