= Perissomastix pauliani =

Scientific classification
- Kingdom: Animalia
- Phylum: Arthropoda
- Clade: Pancrustacea
- Class: Insecta
- Order: Lepidoptera
- Family: Tineidae
- Genus: Perissomastix
- Species: P. pauliani

Binomial name
- Perissomastix pauliani Gozmány, 1970

Species of moth

Perissomastix pauliani is a species of moth in the family Tineidae. It was described by Hungarian entomologist László Anthony Gozmány in 1970 and is found in Madagascar.

This species has a wingspan of 18–20 mm, antennae are dark yellowish grey; head, thorax and forewings are dark purplish fuscous with some violet shine. No pattern. Hindwings are brassy grey.

The type was provided from Tsimbazaza, Antananarivo, collected by R.Paulian, to whom this species was dedicated in February 1949.
