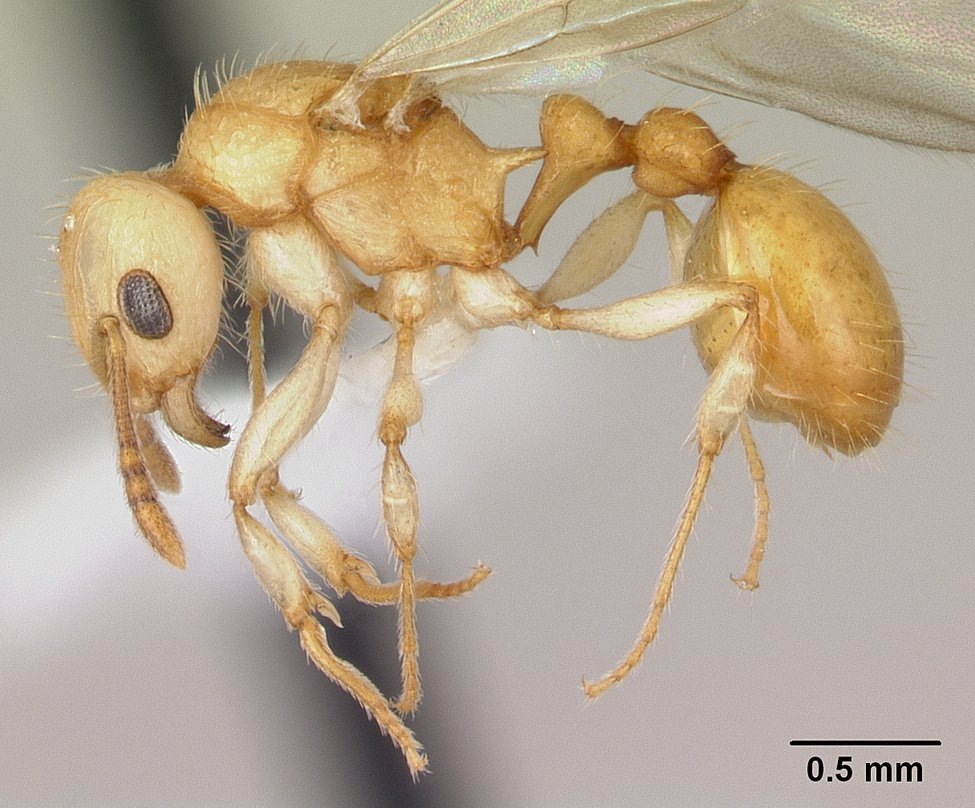
- Vitsika crebra alate specimen

Scientific classification
- Kingdom: Animalia
- Phylum: Arthropoda
- Class: Insecta
- Order: Hymenoptera
- Family: Formicidae
- Subfamily: Myrmicinae
- Tribe: Crematogastrini
- Genus: Vitsika; Bolton & Fisher, 2014

Type species
- Vitsika crebra Bolton & Fisher, 2014

Diversity
- 16 species

= Vitsika =

Genus of ants

Vitsika is a Malagasy genus of ants in the subfamily Myrmicinae. Described in 2014, the genus contains 14 species. The genus Myrmisaraka described in the same publication was synonymized with this genus by Fisher & Bolton in 2016 after molecular data placed its two species, M. brevis and M. producta, nested inside Vitsika.

== Description ==
Queens are known for all species except V. obscura. The queens may be alate or ergatoid, or both forms may occur within a single species. It is possible that all species will be found to produce both ergatoids and alates when the species are better represented in collections. Two species (V. manifesta, V. suspicax) exhibit morphological intermediates between alate and ergatoid forms, and two species (V. acclivitas and V. crebra) appear to be polygynous.

Worker-associated males are known for V. crebra, V. breviscapa and V. labes. In addition, the males of three other species, collected in isolation (in Malaise traps), are present in collections. Similar in size to the conspecific worker or slightly smaller.

== Species ==
- Vitsika acclivitas Bolton & Fisher, 2014
- Vitsika astuta Bolton & Fisher, 2014
- Vitsika brevis (Bolton & Fisher, 2014)
- Vitsika breviscapa Bolton & Fisher, 2014
- Vitsika crebra Bolton & Fisher, 2014
- Vitsika disjuncta Bolton & Fisher, 2014
- Vitsika incisura Bolton & Fisher, 2014
- Vitsika labes Bolton & Fisher, 2014
- Vitsika manifesta Bolton & Fisher, 2014
- Vitsika miranda Bolton & Fisher, 2014
- Vitsika obscura Bolton & Fisher, 2014
- Vitsika procera Bolton & Fisher, 2014
- Vitsika producta (Bolton & Fisher, 2014)
- Vitsika suspicax Bolton & Fisher, 2014
- Vitsika tenuis Bolton & Fisher, 2014
- Vitsika venustas Bolton & Fisher, 2014
