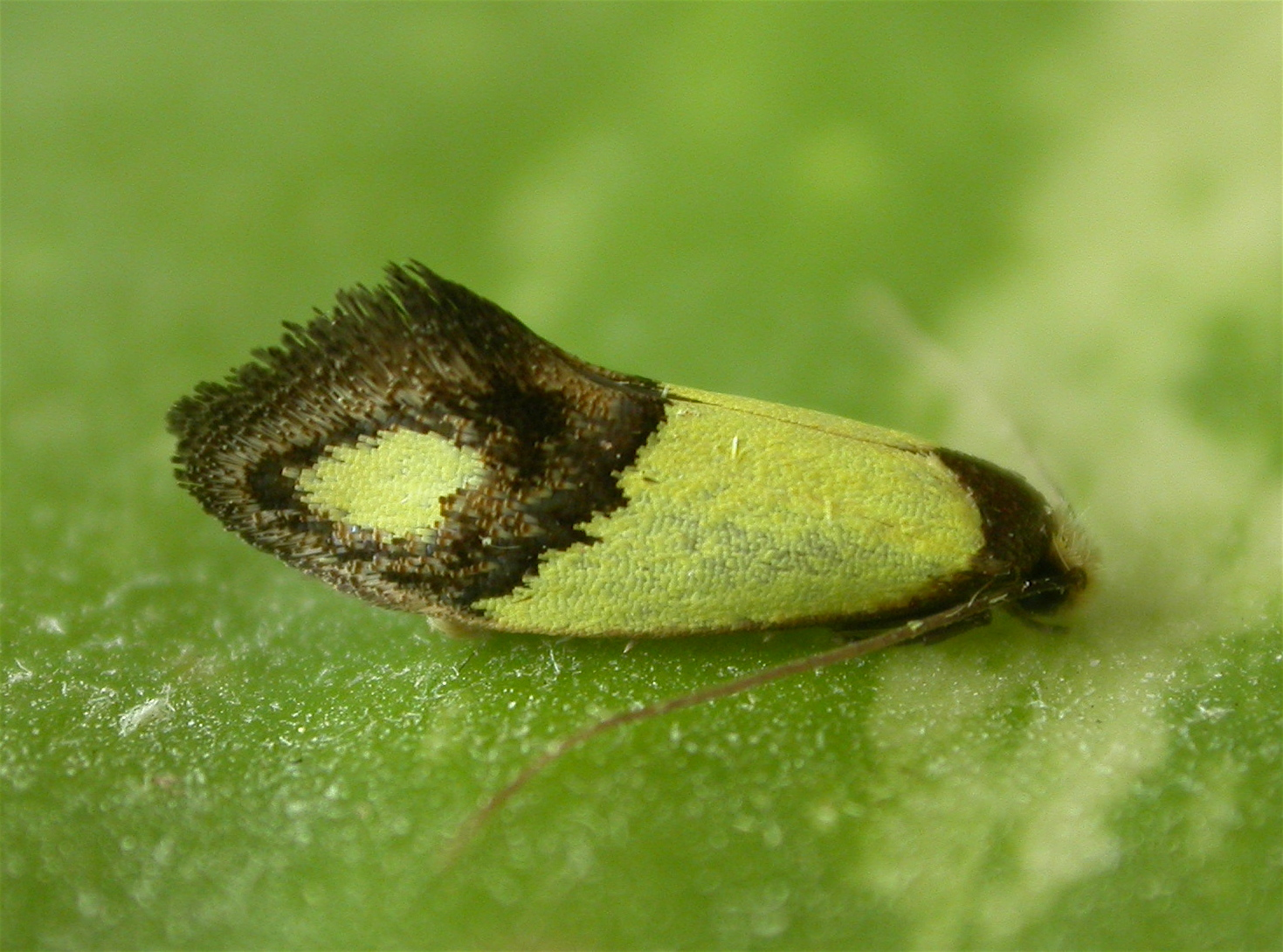
- Edosa fraudulens in Australia

Scientific classification
- Kingdom: Animalia
- Phylum: Arthropoda
- Clade: Pancrustacea
- Class: Insecta
- Order: Lepidoptera
- Family: Tineidae
- Subfamily: Perissomasticinae
- Genus: Edosa; Walker, 1866

Synonyms
- Bilobatana Zagulajev, 1975; Chrysoryctis Meyrick, 1886; Episcardia Ragonot, 1895; Sphallesthasis Gozmany, 1959

= Edosa =

Genus of moths

Edosa is a genus of moths belonging to the family Tineidae.

== Species ==
- Edosa abathra (Meyrick, 1920)
- Edosa albicapitella Gaedike, 2014
- Edosa amseli (Petersen & Gaedike, 1982)
- Edosa audens (Meyrick, 1921)
- Edosa balanosema (Meyrick, 1893) (=Chrysoryctis heminephela Lower, 1903, Tinea plagiomochla Turner, 1926)
- Edosa bicornuta (Gozmány, 2004)
- Edosa caerulipennis (Erschoff, 1874) (=Edosa glossoptera Rose & Pathania, 2003, Episcardia hindostanica Zagulajev, 1966, Tineola indiella Caradja, 1920, Tinea iritis Meyrick, 1911, Euplocamus violaceus Christoph, 1888)
- Edosa caradjella (Zagulajev, 1964)
- Edosa citrocoma (Meyrick, 1924)
- Edosa crassivalva (Gozmány, 1968)
- Edosa cristata (Gozmány, 1967)
- Edosa cymopelta (Meyrick, 1925)
- Edosa darjeelingella (Zagulajev, 1964)
- Edosa cheligera (Gozmány, 1970)
- Edosa effulgens (Gozmány, 1965)
- Edosa enchrista (Meyrick, 1917)
- Edosa endroedyi (Gozmány, 1966)
- Edosa ensigera (Gozmány, 1966)
- Edosa eurycera (Diakonoff, 1968)
- Edosa exhausta (Meyrick, 1917) (Sphallesthasis gracilis Gozmány, 1959 , Episcardia luteola Petersen, 1959, Sphallesthasis similis Gozmány, 1959)
- Edosa fraudulens (Rosenstock, 1885)
- Edosa furcata Gaedike, 2014
- Edosa glabrella (Walker, 1863)
- Edosa griseella (Robinson, 1985)
- Edosa gypsoptera (Gozmány, 1968)
- Edosa haplodora (Meyrick, 1917)
- Edosa hemichrysella (Walker, 1866)
- Edosa hemilampra (Diakonoff, 1968)
- Edosa hemisema (Lower, 1903)
- Edosa hypocritica (Meyrick, 1893) (=Chrysoryctis idiochroa Lower, 1918)
- Edosa irruptella (Walker, 1864) (=Chrysoryctis eurybaphes Meyrick, 1893)
- Edosa islamella Petersen & Gaedike, 1982
- Edosa isocharis (Meyrick, 1930) (=Tinea anisoxantha Diakonoff, 1955)
- Edosa isopela (Meyrick, 1917)
- Edosa lardatella (Lederer, 1858)
- Edosa leucastis (Meyrick, 1908)
- Edosa liomorpha (Meyrick, 1894)
- Edosa lissochlora (Meyrick, 1921)
- Edosa malthacopis (Meyrick, 1936)
- Edosa melanostoma (Meyrick, 1908)
- Edosa meliphanes (Meyrick, 1893)
- Edosa montanata (Gozmány, 1968)
- Edosa namakwana Mey, 2011
- Edosa namibiae (Gozmány, 2004)
- Edosa nesocharis (Meyrick, 1928)
- Edosa nestoria (Meyrick, 1910) (=Episcardia splendens Petersen, 1973)
- Edosa nigralba (Gozmány, 1968)
- Edosa ochracea (Meyrick, 1893)
- Edosa ochranthes (Meyrick, 1893)
- Edosa opsigona (Meyrick, 1911) (=Edosa neoopsigona Rose & Pathania, 2003, Episcardia nepalensis Petersen, 1982)
- Edosa oratrix (Meyrick, 1913)
- Edosa orphnodes (Meyrick, 1911)
- Edosa paghmanella (Petersen, 1973)
- Edosa paraglossoptera Rose & Pathania, 2003
- Edosa pareffulgens Gaedike, 2014
- Edosa perinipha (Gozmány, 1968)
- Edosa perseverans (Meyrick, 1926)
- Edosa philbyi (Robinson, 1985)
- Edosa phlegethon (Gozmány, 1968)
- Edosa platyntis (Meyrick, 1894) (=Edosa sattleri Rose & Pathania, 2003)
- Edosa platyphaea (Meyrick, 1926)
- Edosa porphyrophaes (Turner, 1917)
- Edosa powelli (Robinson, 1985)
- Edosa purella (Walker, 1863)
- Edosa purpurascens (Diakonoff, 1968)
- Edosa pygmaeana (Petersen, 1959)
- Edosa pyriata (Meyrick, 1917)
- Edosa pyroceps (Gozmány, 1967)
- Edosa pyrochra (Gozmány, 1965)
- Edosa rhodesica (Gozmány, 1967)
- Edosa robustella (Walker, 1863)
- Edosa sacerdos (Walsingham, 1885)
- Edosa sanctifica (Meyrick, 1921)
- Edosa sinica (Gaedike, 1984)
- Edosa spinosa (Gaedike, 1984)
- Edosa strepsineura (Meyrick, 1926)
- Edosa subochraceella (Walsingham, 1886)
- Edosa synaema (Meyrick, 1905)
- Edosa talantias (Meyrick, 1893)
- Edosa torrifacta (Gozmány, 1965)
- Edosa trita (Meyrick, 1925)
- Edosa tyrannica (Meyrick, 1893)
- Edosa violacella (Rebel, 1893) (=Tinea luteocapitella Amsel, 1935, Tineola fuscoviolacella Ragonot, 1895)
- Edosa xerxes (Petersen & Gaedike, 1984)
- Edosa xystidophora (Meyrick, 1893)
