= Madagascar Biodiversity Center =

Madagascar-based research center

Coordinates: 18.93260°S 47.52537°E

- Founded: 2002
- Location: Botanical and Zoological Garden of Tsimbazaza
- Executive director: Brian Fisher

The Madagascar Biodiversity Center or Bibikely Biodiversity Center is Madagascar's first and only biodiversity research center, and is a joint project of the Bibikely Biodiversity Institute, and the California Academy of Sciences, in cooperation with the Malagasy government.

== Introduction ==
The Bibikely Biodiversity Institute is an NGO founded and presently directed by Dr. Brian Fisher, preeminent field biologist, and the curator and chairman of the entomology department of the California Academy of Sciences.

The center began operations in rented facilities in 1996 and moved into its permanent facility in late 2004, which is leased at no cost from the Malagasy government until 2055.

Located within the Botanical and Zoological Garden of Tsimbazaza in Madagascar's capital city, Antananarivo, the new facility is adjacent to the Malagasy Academy of Sciences, the Academy Library, and the Academy Herbarium.

== Goals ==
=== Conservation ===
The center was conceived in 2001 as a means to provide a safe and permanent home for the Bibikely Biodiversity Institute to continue its work of cataloging and understanding the rich biological endowment that is Madagascar's biodiversity.

Center's research will help to identify and protect more than three times the currently protected land in Madagascar.

=== Understanding ===
The center will enable the Bibikely Biodiversity Institute to expand its work in understanding the ecosystems of Madagascar, particularly as they relate to arthropods.

=== Education ===
The center will provide the facilities required to train a larger number of students, particularly those from Madagascar itself, in the science and practice of systematics, ecology, conservation and entomology.

=== Collection ===
The center will also provide space to house the Malagasy government's National Arthropod Collection, a repository of thousands of specimens of arthropods collected on Madagascar. The collection makes possible a large part of the needed research on arthropods of Madagascar.

== See also ==
- California Academy of Sciences
