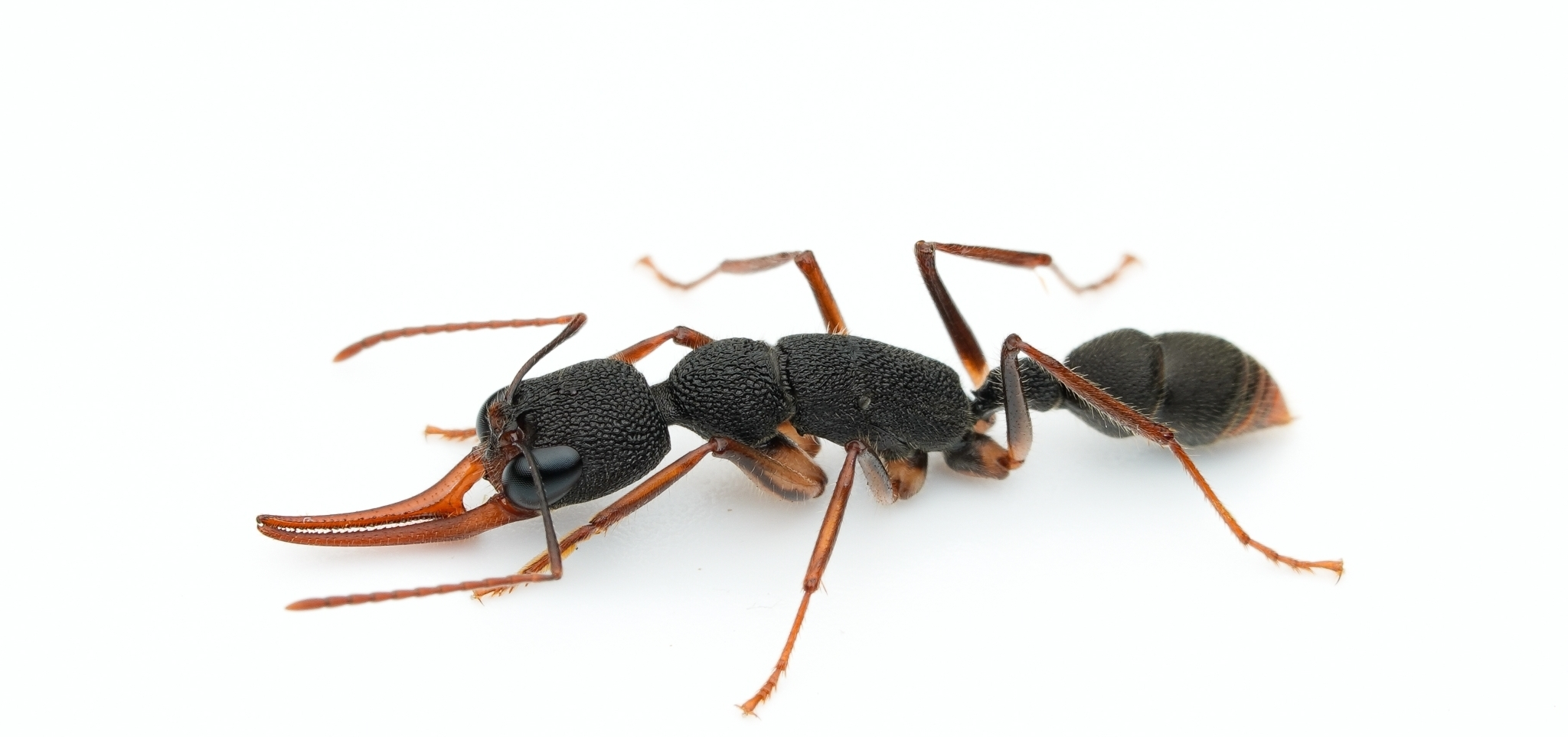

Scientific classification
- Kingdom: Animalia
- Phylum: Arthropoda
- Clade: Pancrustacea
- Class: Insecta
- Order: Hymenoptera
- Family: Formicidae
- Genus: Harpegnathos
- Species: H. venator

Binomial name
- Harpegnathos venator (Smith, 1858)

Synonyms
- Drepanognathus venator, Smith, 1858

= Harpegnathos venator =

Species of ant

Harpegnathos venator is a species of ant found in South and Southeast Asia in northern India and parts of Burma. Like other ants in the genus Harpegnathos, it jumps to capture prey and lives in relatively small nesting colonies.

== Subspecies ==
- H. v. chapmani Donisthorpe, 1937
- H. v. rugosus (Mayr, 1862)

== Description ==
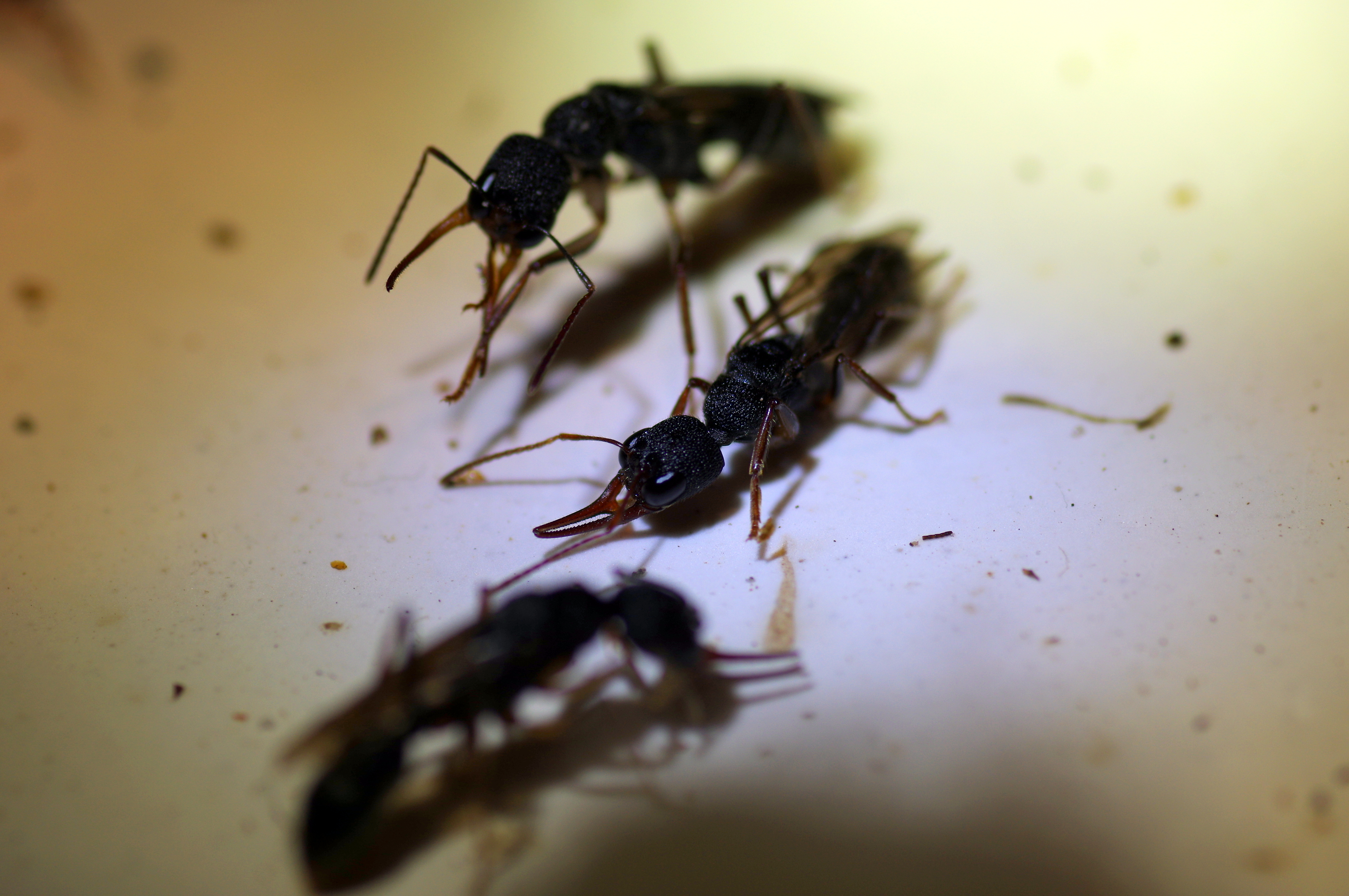
Queen

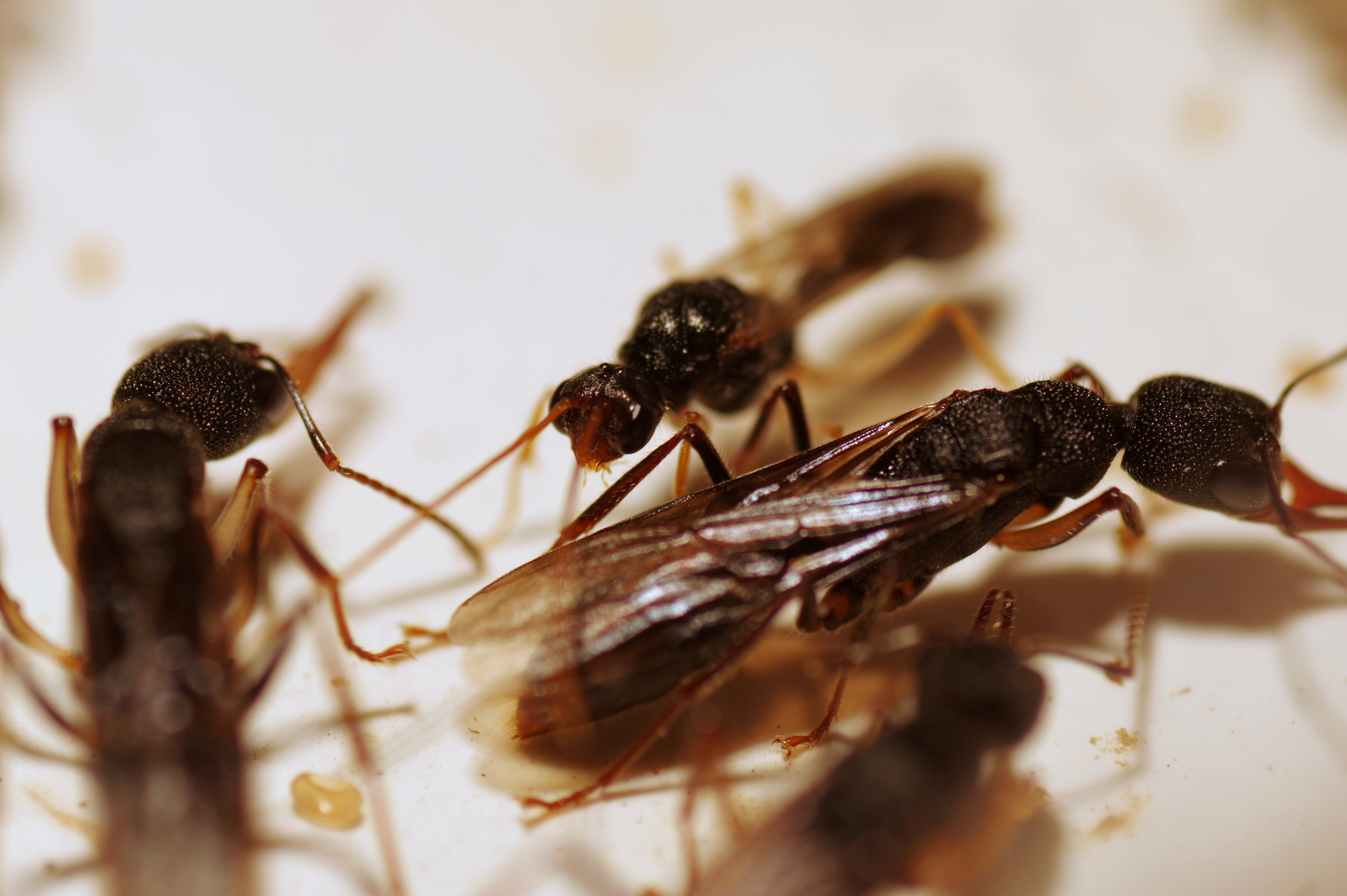
Male and queen

The following is a taxonomic description of the ant based on C. T. Bingham's The Fauna of British India, Including Ceylon and Burma (Hymenoptera, Volume 2):

- Worker: Black; mandibles, clypeus, antennal carinae, and legs brownish yellow, antennae chestnut, apex of the abdomen rusty; head and thorax closely coarsely cribrate punctate; abdomen finely densely reticulate punctate, opaque, with some large shallow punctures. Head, thorax and abdomen covered with rather sparse, short, erect pale hairs; pubescence minute but fairly plentiful, to be seen only in certain lights. For the rest the characters of the genus.
- Queen: Similar to the worker, but the abdomen with long oblong punctures, the ocelli in the middle of the front. Thorax and abdomen more massive and as in Harpegnathos saltator.
- Male: Mandibles broad at the base, attenuate, narrow and slender towards the apex, which is directed forwards. Head rectangular, somewhat rounded, broader than long. Eyes rather smaller than in the queen. A short depression between the mesonotum and scutellum, bordered by carinae and strongly striated inside. Smooth and shining, except for the thorax, which is coarsely rugose, punctate or striated (longitudinally on the metanotum). Covered by a fine yellowish pilosity, dense on the legs, less abundant elsewhere. Pubescence very sparse. The first abdominal segment is pyriform and has the appearance of forming a second node to the pedicel, a slight constriction between the second and third segments. Thorax and pedicel of a brownish black, head and basal segment of the abdomen reddish yellow. Best of the abdomen yellow with a tinge of red. Legs and antenna) very pale testaceous.
- Multifunctional mandibles: The ant's mandible exhibits spatially-dependent morphology and bi-axial kinematics, which collectively allows it to perform various daily labors from hunting and attacking to carefully caring for ant eggs. Regarding the spatially-dependent morphology, at the distal-to-middle part, the mandible has double-rowed, non-parallel teeth responsible for powerful clamping. At the proximal part, the mandible has a smooth concavity that is solely used for gently gripping ant eggs. On the other hand, the mandible rotates about two orthogonal axes, changing the mandibular distance and configuration simultaneously. The spatially-dependent morphology and bi-axial kinematics endow the ant mandible multifunctionality.

They build their nests with the entrance hole on sloped earth under forest shade. The nests have about 8 to 70 individuals in multiple chambers. Workers and queens mostly stayed in the upper chamber while nest chambers are below them and these disc-shaped chambers are connected by a single thin column or funnel with a hole just enough for one ant to pass through. Workers are known to lay infertile trophic eggs which are laid for feeding the reproductives.
