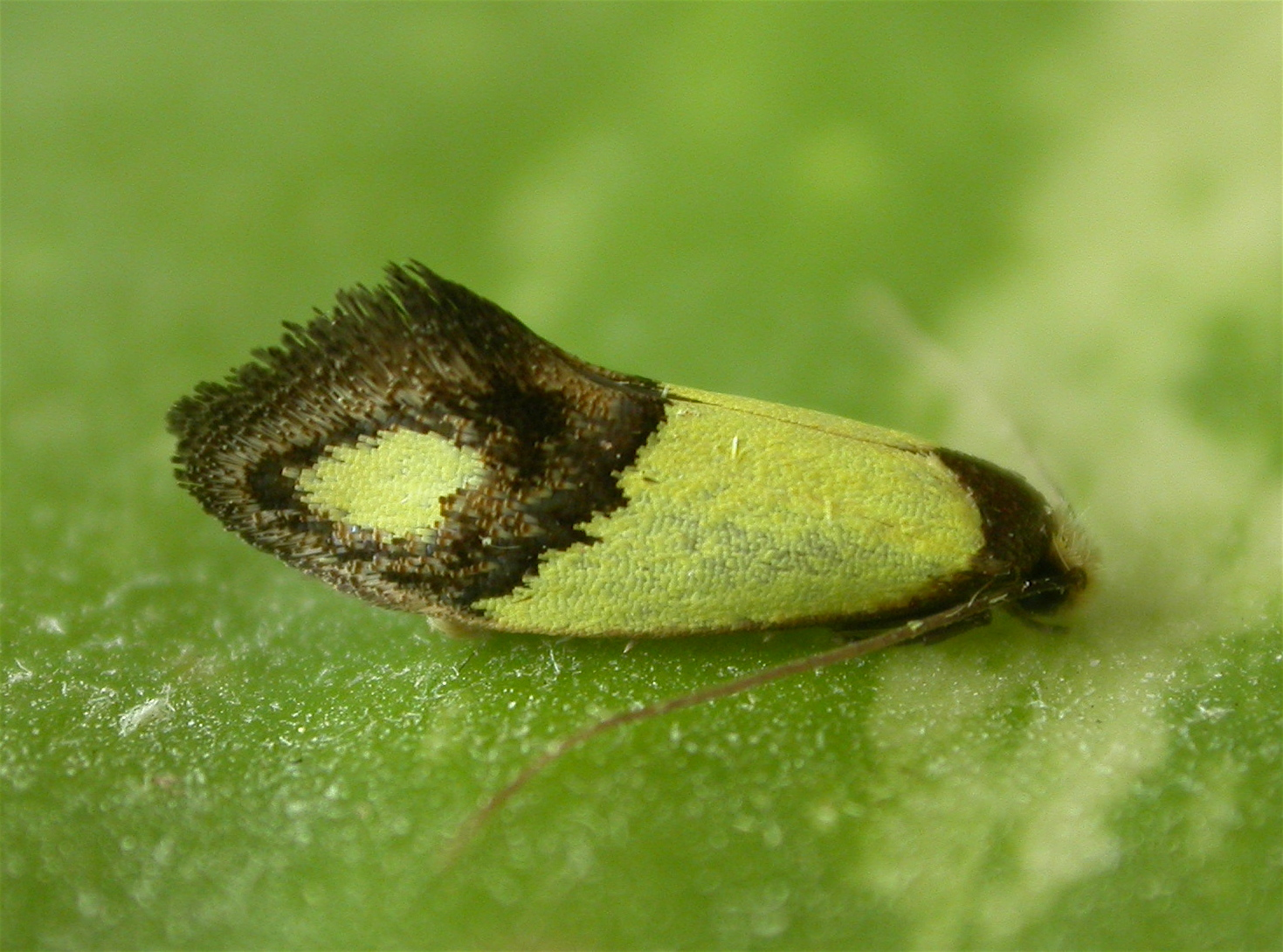

Scientific classification
- Kingdom: Animalia
- Phylum: Arthropoda
- Class: Insecta
- Order: Lepidoptera
- Family: Tineidae
- Genus: Edosa
- Species: E. fraudulens

Binomial name
- Edosa fraudulens (Rosenstock, 1885)

Synonyms
- Tinea fraudulens Rosenstock, 1885

= Edosa fraudulens =

Species of moth

Edosa fraudulens is a moth of the family Tineidae. It is found widely in southern Australia.

According to Moths of Australia (1990), it has "light yellow fore wings with the apical one-third patterned in brown and lilac."
