= Edosa pyriata =

Scientific classification
- Kingdom: Animalia
- Phylum: Arthropoda
- Clade: Pancrustacea
- Class: Insecta
- Order: Lepidoptera
- Family: Tineidae
- Genus: Edosa
- Species: E. pyriata

Binomial name
- Edosa pyriata Meyrick, 1917
- Range

Synonyms
- Tinea pyriata

Moth species

Edosa pyriata is a moth in the family Tineidae. The species was first identified in 1917 by English entomologist Edward Meyrick, who is considered to have laid the foundation for the identification of microlepidoptera. Meyrick donated his collection of microlepidoptera to the British Museum (Natural History), where the type specimen is now located.

== Geographic range ==
Edosa pyriata is found in India in the state of Assam near what was formerly known as the Khasi Hills district of India, which has since been merged with the Jaintia Hills district to form the state of Meghalaya.

Little is published about E. pyriata specifically, however most tineid moths live in areas in which there is a presence of aquatic and freshwater sources. It has been shown that most members of Lepidoptera die quickly if water is not available. The region of Assam in northeastern India is one of two biodiversity hotspots in the country, and is home to many rare and endemic species, such as 1,365 species of Lepidoptera, including 387 species of moths distributed throughout the state.

== Reproduction and development ==
=== Reproduction ===
Mating is driven by pheromones emitted by either female or male individuals. The eggs are internally fertilized by male sperm, which enters the eggs through a small pore called the micropyle. Females in the Edosa genus have an apomorphic trait in which their abdominal segments are invaginated to form pockets that contain fine, silky hairs, called a corethrogyne, which attach a protective fluff to the eggs to defend them from parasites.

=== Development ===
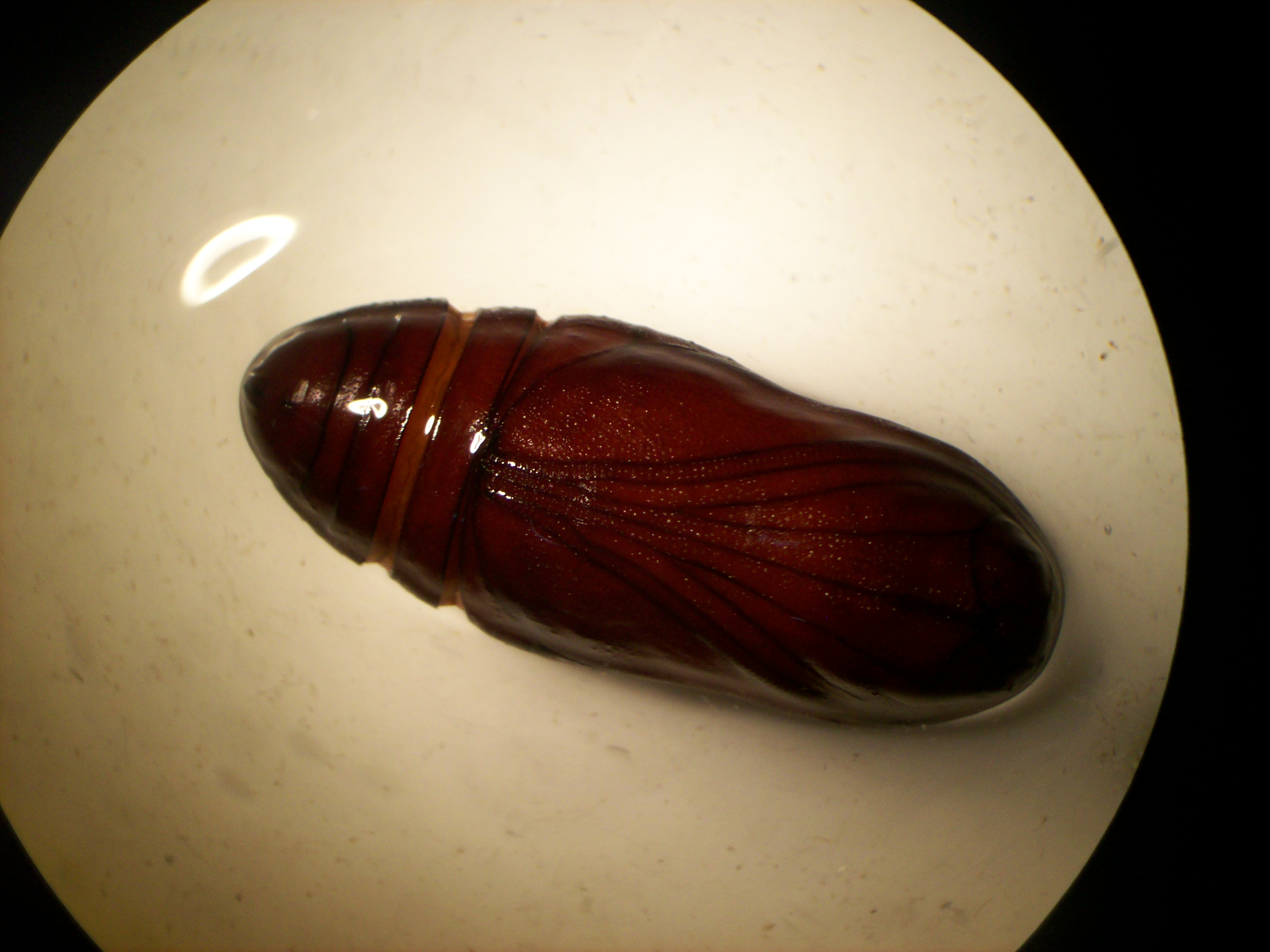
Ventral view of a Lepidoptera pupa.

All moth species, including Edosa pyriata, undergo holometabolous development. This type of metamorphosis includes development through a series of stages, from egg, larva, pupa, finally to maturity. Following the egg stage of development, the moths go through a larval stage in which the primary goal is to consume enough food to provide energy for the growth stage that occurs in the pupa, as well as provide much of the energy for the reproduction and adult phase of life. The pupal phase of development takes place in cocoons, in which the larva that entered the cocoon exits at full maturity.

== Lifespan and longevity ==
Full developmental time from egg to adult varies greatly between moth species, however average developmental time for Lepidoptera is 30–50 days. On average, adult moths only live for about a week or two. However, adult lifespan differs greatly between species, ranging from a few days up to a year in some cases. In these species with longer lifespans, the moths are able to overwinter via hibernation or migration, similarly to monarch butterflies.

== Physical description ==
There isn't a significant amount of literature on the physical description of Edosa pyriata. In species that undergo holometabolism, it can be extremely difficult to accurately identify species while in their larval or pupal life stages as they often differ greatly from their adult forms. However, Meyrick originally describes an adult male specimen with the following features: small to medium in size with wingspan of 8mm, light greyish-ochreous head, grey palpi, grey-whitish antenna, light grey abdomen, elongate and rather narrow forewings, gently arched costa, obtuse and pointed apex, very obliquely rounded, pale ochreous cilia and hindwings that are 5 and 6 stalked. as well as refracting superpositioned eyes. Moths in the Tineidae family share the trait of tented upward pointed wings when at rest.

== Food habits, predation and ecosystem roles ==
=== Food habits ===
Though the food habits of Edosa pyriata are not recorded, the Tineidae family of moths that it belongs to is known as the fungus moths, due to their unique choice to mainly feed on fungus, lichens and detritus.

=== Predation and parasitization ===
Roles and interactions of Edosa pyriata are not well studied, but members of the Lepidoptera order are known to be parasitized by members of the Copidosoma genus of chalcid wasps. More specifically for tineid moths, Copidosoma nuarzumense is a parasitoid wasp that lays its eggs in the moths, eventually causing the death of the hosts.

== Genetic Information ==
Currently, there are no recorded instances of genetic information for Edosa pyriata. Due to difficulty in distinguishing members of the Tineidae family via morphological features, a study of genetic information on this species and others in its family could make identification more consistent and accurate.
