= Perissomastix nigerica =

Scientific classification
- Kingdom: Animalia
- Phylum: Arthropoda
- Clade: Pancrustacea
- Class: Insecta
- Order: Lepidoptera
- Family: Tineidae
- Genus: Perissomastix
- Species: P. nigerica

Binomial name
- Perissomastix nigerica Gozmány, 1967

Species of moth

Perissomastix nigerica is a species of moth in the family Tineidae. It is found in Nigeria. It was described by Hungarian entomologist László Anthony Gozmány in 1967.

This species has a wingspan of about 15 mm. Thorax and forewings are argillaceous with a light greyish suffusion and no pattern. The hindwings are medium grey.
