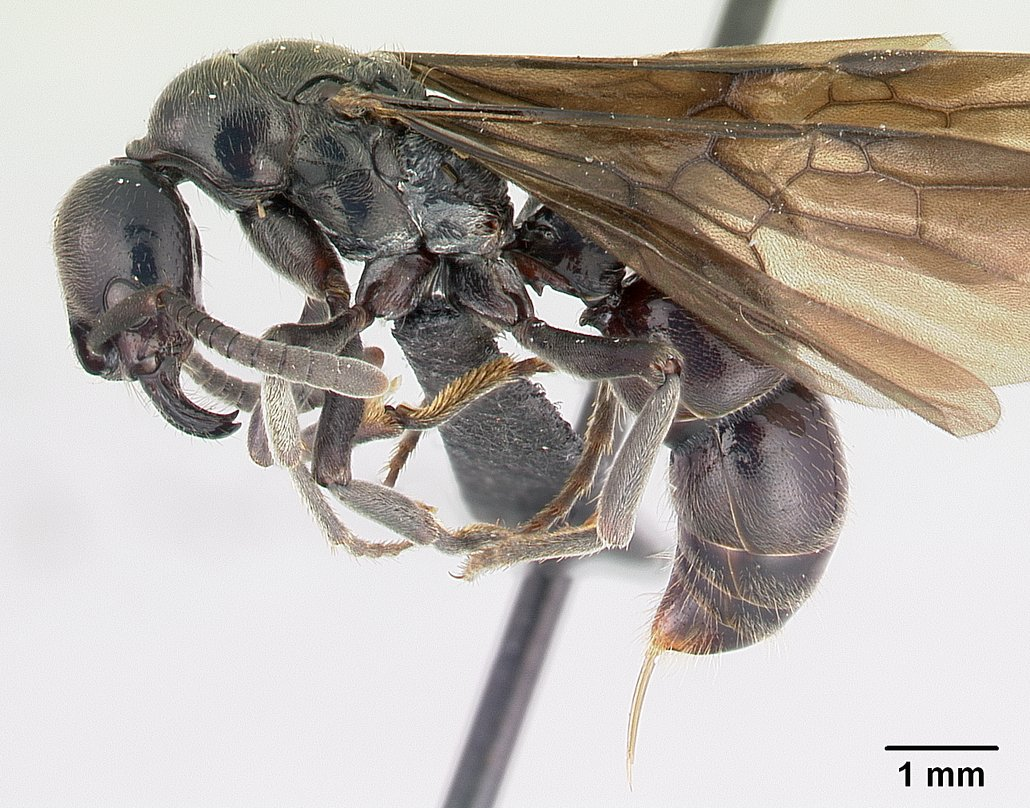
- Euponera sikorae AntWeb alate queen specimen

Scientific classification
- Kingdom: Animalia
- Phylum: Arthropoda
- Class: Insecta
- Order: Hymenoptera
- Family: Formicidae
- Subfamily: Ponerinae
- Tribe: Ponerini
- Alliance: Odontomachus genus group
- Genus: Euponera; Forel, 1891

Type species
- Ponera sikorae Forel, 1891

Diversity
- 15 species

= Euponera =

Genus of ants

Euponera is a genus of ponerine ants distributed widely throughout the Afrotropical and Indomalayan realms. Workers of Euponera are large (6–10.5 mm) while queens are similar to workers, though larger and winged.

== Species ==
As of 2026, the genus possesses 16 valid species. It used to contain many more species, however those were all transferred away into different genera over time.

- Euponera agnivo Rakotonirina & Fisher, 2013
- Euponera antsiraka (Rakotonirina & Fisher, 2013)
- Euponera daraina Rakotonirina & Fisher, 2013
- Euponera gorogota Rakotonirina & Fisher, 2013
- Euponera haratsingy Rakotonirina & Fisher, 2013
- Euponera ivolo Rakotonirina & Fisher, 2013
- Euponera maeva Rakotonirina & Fisher, 2013
- Euponera mialy Rakotonirina & Fisher, 2013
- Euponera nosy Rakotonirina & Fisher, 2013
- Euponera rovana Rakotonirina & Fisher, 2013
- Euponera sikorae (Forel, 1891)
- Euponera sjostedti (Mayr, 1896)
- Euponera tahary Rakotonirina & Fisher, 2013
- Euponera vohitravo Rakotonirina & Fisher, 2013
- Euponera zoro Rakotonirina & Fisher, 2013
