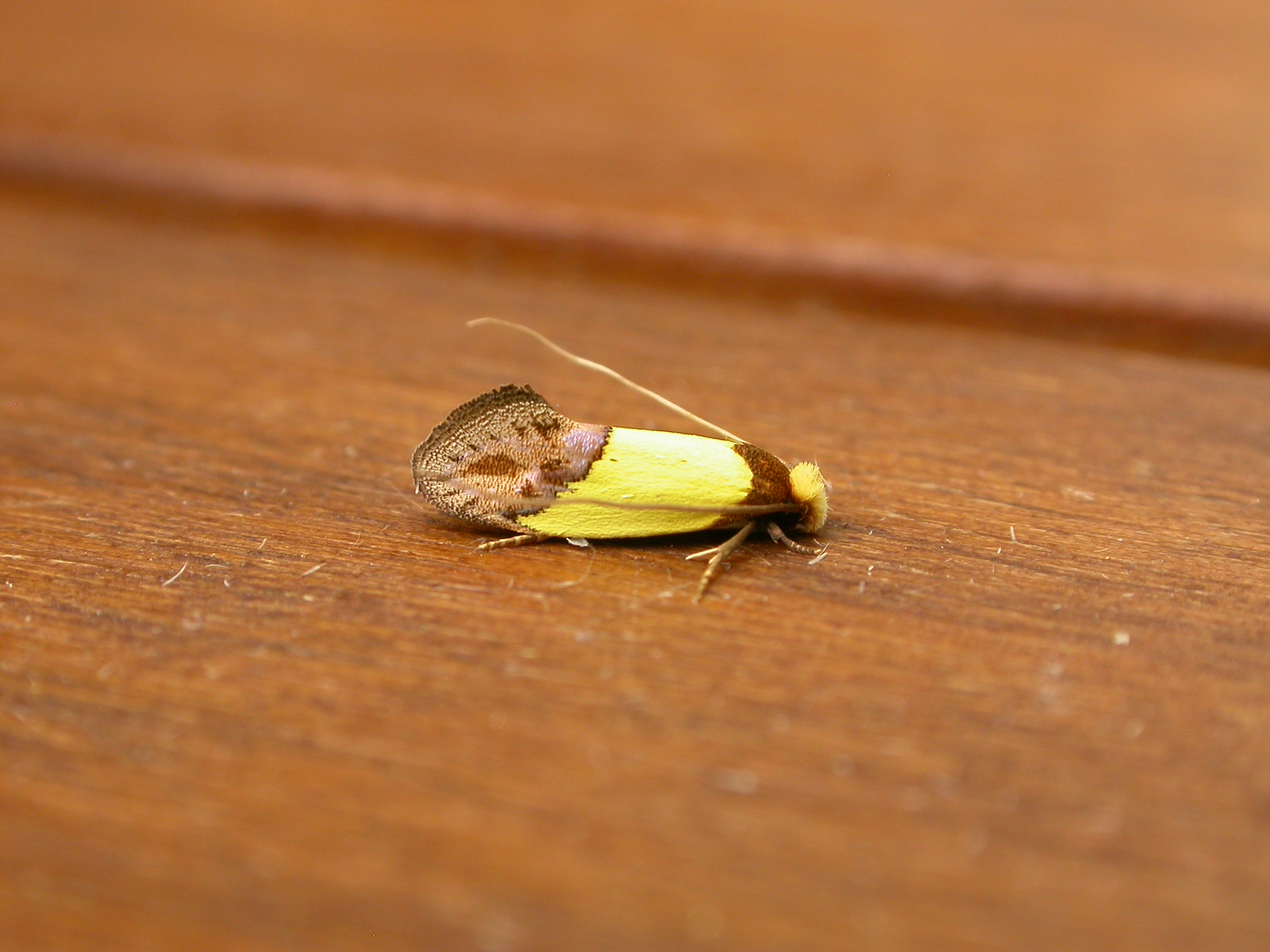

Scientific classification
- Kingdom: Animalia
- Phylum: Arthropoda
- Clade: Pancrustacea
- Class: Insecta
- Order: Lepidoptera
- Family: Tineidae
- Genus: Edosa
- Species: E. xystidophora

Binomial name
- Edosa xystidophora (Meyrick, 1893)

Synonyms
- Chrysoryctis xystidophora Meyrick, 1893

= Edosa xystidophora =

Species of moth

Edosa xystidophora is a species of moth of the family Tineidae. It is found in Australia in Queensland and New South Wales.
