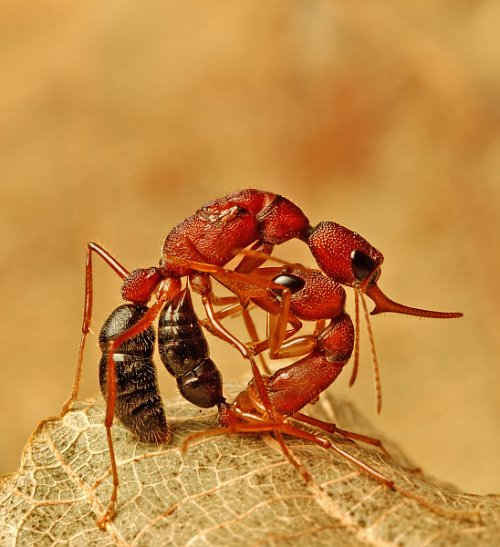
- Worker H. saltator killing a queen in an inter-colony conflict

Scientific classification
- Kingdom: Animalia
- Phylum: Arthropoda
- Clade: Pancrustacea
- Class: Insecta
- Order: Hymenoptera
- Family: Formicidae
- Subfamily: Ponerinae
- Tribe: Ponerini
- Alliance: Harpegnathos genus group
- Genus: Harpegnathos; Jerdon, 1851

Type species
- Harpegnathos saltator Jerdon, 1851

Diversity
- 9 species

Synonyms
- Drepanognathus Smith, F., 1858

= Harpegnathos =

Genus of ants

Harpegnathos is a small ponerine genus of ants found in South and Southeast Asia. They are notable for their jumping ability, complex colony structure, and large to very large workers easily identifiable by their long mandibles and large eyes.

== Taxonomy ==
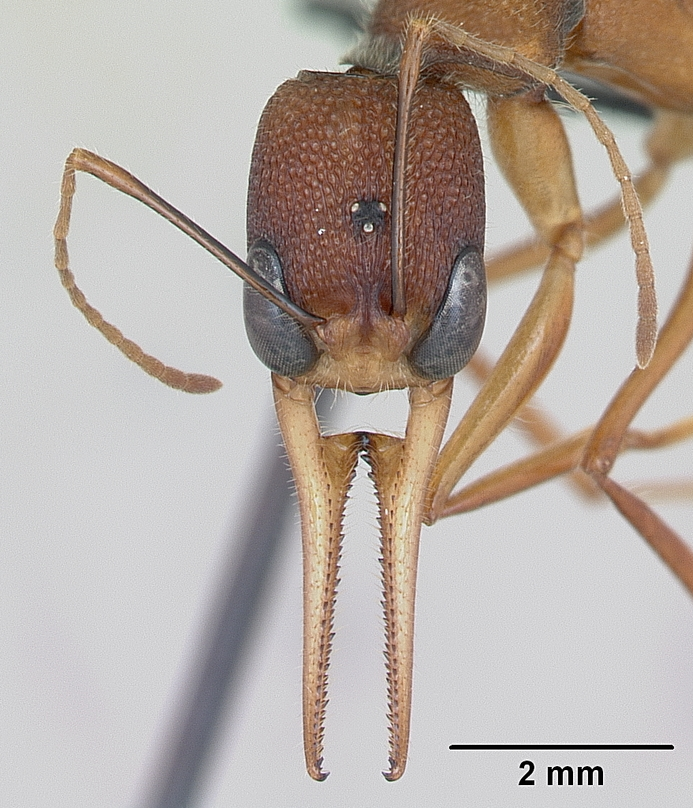
Head view of a Harpegnathos saltator worker, showing their characteristic long scythe-shaped mandibles

The genus was established by Thomas C. Jerdon in 1851 to house the single species Harpegnathos saltator, found in India. Believing that the name was unavailable due to homonymy, Smith (1858) incorrectly erected the unnecessary replacement name Drepanognathus (now a synonym of Harpegnathos). For some time, both names were used in publications by other authors until the original name was restored. The most recent species was described in 2016, making the total number of Harpegnathos species nine, with an additional four described subspecies. The genus is closely related to the other genera in its tribe, Ponerini, and is probably a sister to all Ponerini.

== Multifunctional mandibles ==
The ant's mandible exhibits spatially-dependent morphology and bi-axial kinematics, which collectively allows it to perform various daily labors from hunting and attacking to carefully caring for ant eggs. Regarding the spatially-dependent morphology, at the distal-to-middle part, the mandible has double-rowed, non-parallel teeth responsible for powerful clamping. At the proximal part, the mandible has a smooth concavity that is solely used for gently gripping ant eggs. On the other hand, the mandible rotates about two orthogonal axes, changing the mandibular distance and configuration simultaneously. The spatially-dependent morphology and bi-axial kinematics endow the ant mandible multifunctionality.

== Hunting behavior ==
Harpegnathos is an extremely distinctive genus appearance-wise, being very reminiscent of the Myrmecia found in Australia. Like Myrmecia, Harpegnathos has very large eyes, since both hunt mostly by vision and do not lay down pheromone trails like most other ants. Also like Myrmecia, they have large jaws since, owing to their lack of pheromone signals, workers are solitary hunters and must carry food back to the nest in their jaws since they also lack a social stomach.

== Colony structure ==
Harpegnathos has a complex and different colony structure compared to other genera. In the beginning, young winged queens fly out from their natal colony, mate with foreign males and start new colonies independently. What differs from other ants is that, once the short-lived founding queen dies, several daughter workers replace her as reproductives in the colony. Characteristic of several ponerine species, workers can mate (almost always with foreign males) and store sperm in the spermatheca.

In H. saltator, many young workers inbreed with males from the same colony (their brothers). They fight to establish a dominance hierarchy, and a few high-ranking workers become reproductives and lay eggs, so-called gamergates. Every year, new winged queens are reared, and they disperse and start the process again. The combination of queen and gamergate reproduction results in an increased lifespan of colonies, in theory making them immortal.

== Species ==
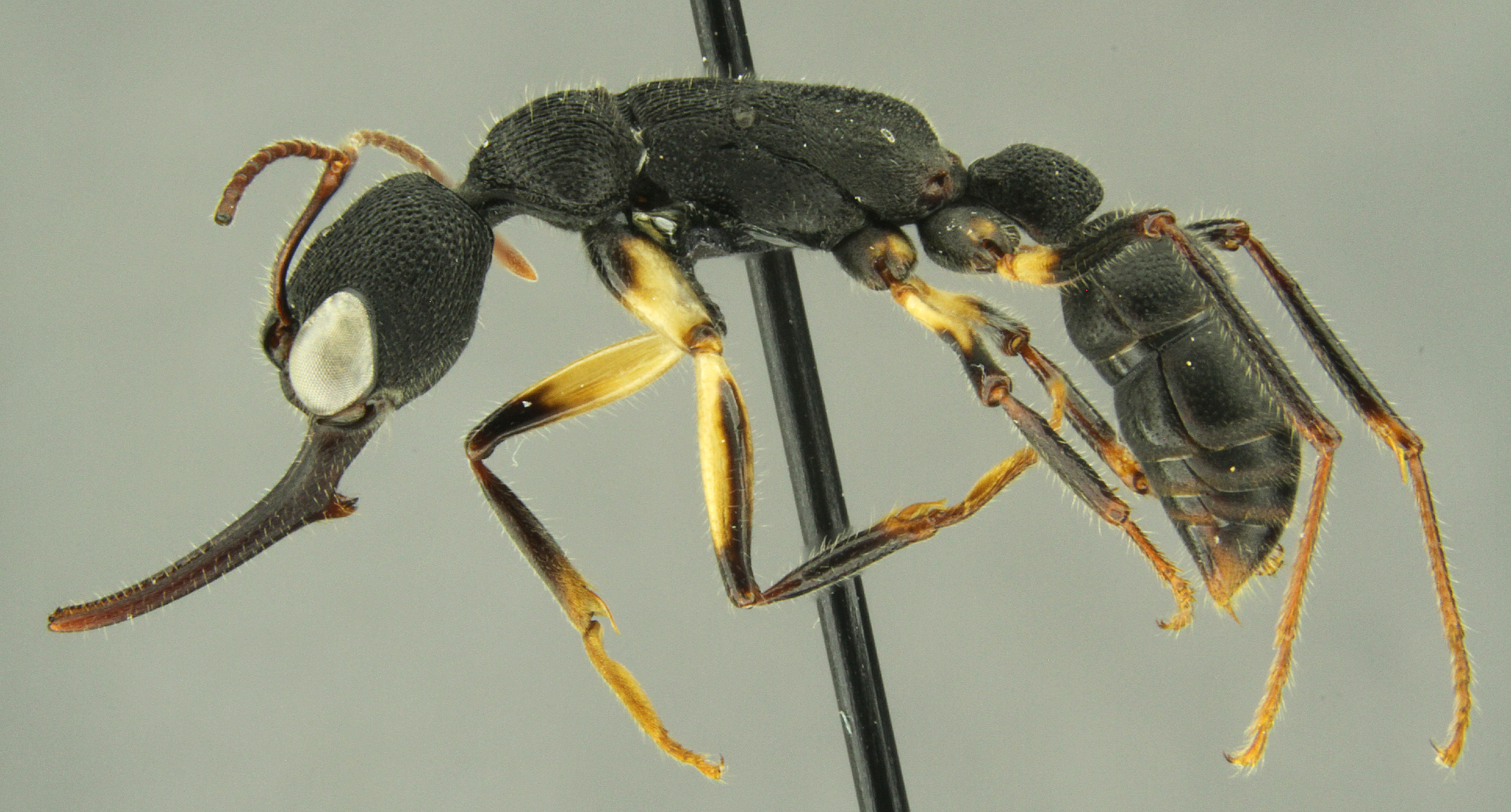
Harpegnathos alperti

- Harpegnathos alperti General, 2016
- Harpegnathos empesoi Chapman, 1963
- Harpegnathos hobbyi Donisthorpe, 1937
- Harpegnathos honestoi General, 2016
- Harpegnathos macgregori Wheeler & Chapman, 1925
- Harpegnathos medioniger Donisthorpe, 1942
- Harpegnathos pallipes (Smith, 1858)
- Harpegnathos saltator Jerdon, 1851
- Harpegnathos venator (Smith, 1858)
