= Edosa rhodesica =

Scientific classification
- Kingdom: Animalia
- Phylum: Arthropoda
- Clade: Pancrustacea
- Class: Insecta
- Order: Lepidoptera
- Family: Tineidae
- Genus: Edosa
- Species: E. rhodesica

Binomial name
- Edosa rhodesica (Gozmány, 1967)

Synonyms
- Episcardia rhodesica Gozmány, 1967

Species of moth

Edosa rhodesica is a species of moth of the family Tineidae. It was described by Hungarian entomologist László Anthony Gozmány in 1967 and is found in Zimbabwe and South Africa.

The wingspan is about 17–19 mm. Its head is yellow, the antennae are argillaceous, and the thorax, scalp and forewings are light yellowish argillaceous, with light brownish scales on the thorax, scalp and costa. There is no pattern present. The hindwings are dark grey, and the cilia are yellowish.
