= Edosa cheligera =

Scientific classification
- Kingdom: Animalia
- Phylum: Arthropoda
- Clade: Pancrustacea
- Class: Insecta
- Order: Lepidoptera
- Family: Tineidae
- Genus: Edosa
- Species: E. cheligera

Binomial name
- Edosa cheligera (Gozmány, 1970)

Synonyms
- Sphallesthasis cheligera Gozmány, 1970

Species of moth

Edosa cheligera is a moth of the family Tineidae. It was described by László Anthony Gozmány in 1970 and is found in Zimbabwe.

This species has a wingspan of 14 mm, its head is light yellow, antennae white, thorax and forewings ochreous stramineous (straw coloured) without pattern. Hindwings are whitish grey.
