= Edosa opsigona =

Scientific classification
- Kingdom: Animalia
- Phylum: Arthropoda
- Clade: Pancrustacea
- Class: Insecta
- Order: Lepidoptera
- Family: Tineidae
- Genus: Edosa
- Species: E. opsigona

Binomial name
- Edosa opsigona (Meyrick, 1911)

Synonyms
- Edosa neoopsigona Rose & Pathania, 2003; Episcardia nepalensis Petersen, 1982; Tinea opsigona Meyrick, 1911

Species of moth

Edosa opsigona is a moth of the family Tineidae first described by Edward Meyrick in 1911. It is found in Sri Lanka.
