= Perissomastix madagascarica =

Scientific classification
- Kingdom: Animalia
- Phylum: Arthropoda
- Clade: Pancrustacea
- Class: Insecta
- Order: Lepidoptera
- Family: Tineidae
- Genus: Perissomastix
- Species: P. madagascarica

Binomial name
- Perissomastix madagascarica Gozmány, 1969

Species of moth

Perissomastix madagascarica is a moth of the family Tineidae. It was described by Hungarian entomologist László Anthony Gozmány in 1969 and is found in Madagascar.

The wingspan of this species is 18–21 mm. Head, palpi, base of thorax are deep black, antennae brownish yellow. Scalp, thorax and forewings brownish grey, forewings irrorated (sprinkled) with vivid violet scales that are very dense in the costal region.
