= Perissomastix =

Scientific classification
- Kingdom: Animalia
- Phylum: Arthropoda
- Clade: Pancrustacea
- Class: Insecta
- Order: Lepidoptera
- Family: Tineidae
- Subfamily: Perissomasticinae
- Genus: Perissomastix; Warren & Rothschild, 1905

Type species
- Perissomastix nigriceps Warren & Rothschild, 1905

Genus of moths

Perissomastix is a genus of moths belonging to the family Tineidae.

== Species ==
Some species of this genus are:

- Perissomastix afghana Petersen, 1959
- Perissomastix acutibasis Gozmány, 1968
- Perissomastix adamasta (Meyrick, 1909)
- Perissomastix agenjoi (Petersen, 1957)
- Perissomastix amseli Petersen, 1959
- Perissomastix asiriella Petersen & Gaedike, 1982
- Perissomastix atlantis Zagulajev, 1975
- Perissomastix atricoma Meyrick, 1931
- Perissomastix bergeri Gozmány, 1967
- Perissomastix bifurcatella Petersen, 1957
- Perissomastix biskraella (Rebel, 1901)
- Perissomastix breviberbis (Meyrick, 1933)
- Perissomastix caryocephala (Meyrick, 1937)
- Perissomastix catapulta Gozmány, 1968
- Perissomastix christinae Gozmány, 1965
- Perissomastix cornuta Petersen, 1959
- Perissomastix crassicornella Agenjo, 1952
- Perissomastix damnificella (Zeller, 1852)
- Perissomastix dentifera Gozmány & Vári, 1973
- Perissomastix falcata Petersen, 1988
- Perissomastix flava (Petersen, 1960)
- Perissomastix fulvicoma (Meyrick, 1921)
- Perissomastix gabori Gozmány, 1967
- Perissomastix gibi Gozmány, 1965
- Perissomastix gozmanyi Capuse, 1971
- Perissomastix hirundinea Meyrick, 1928
- Perissomastix hogasi Capuse, 1971
- Perissomastix holopsamma (Meyrick, 1908)
- Perissomastix idolatrix Gozmány & Vári, 1973
- Perissomastix jemenitica Gaedike, 2014
- Perissomastix lala Gozmány, 1967
- Perissomastix lucifer Gozmány, 1965
- Perissomastix madagascarica Gozmány, 1969
- Perissomastix marcescens (Meyrick, 1908)
- Perissomastix mascherata Gozmány, 1965
- Perissomastix melanops Gozmány, 1967
- Perissomastix meretrix (Meyrick, 1908)
- Perissomastix meruicola Gozmány, 1969
- Perissomastix mili Gozmány, 1965
- Perissomastix montis Gozmány, 1968
- Perissomastix mucrapex Gozmány, 1968
- Perissomastix nigerica Gozmány, 1967
- Perissomastix nigriceps Warren & Rothschild, 1905
- Perissomastix nigrocephala Petersen, 1982
- Perissomastix nox Gozmány, 1968
- Perissomastix onyx Gozmány, 1966
- Perissomastix othello (Meyrick, 1907)
- Perissomastix palaestinella Amsel 1956
- Perissomastix pantsa Gozmány, 1967
- Perissomastix pauliani Gozmány, 1970
- Perissomastix peltiger Mey, 2011
- Perissomastix perdita Gozmány, 1965
- Perissomastix perlata Gozmány, 1967
- Perissomastix peterseni Amsel, 1959
- Perissomastix praxis Gozmány, 1969
- Perissomastix protaxia (Meyrick, 1924)
- Perissomastix pyroxantha (Meyrick, 1914)
- Perissomastix recurvata Gozmány, 1968
- Perissomastix ruwenzorica Gozmány & Vári, 1973
- Perissomastix sericea Gozmány, 1966
- Perissomastix similatrix Gozmány, 1968
- Perissomastix stibarodes (Meyrick, 1908)
- Perissomastix styx Gozmány, 1966
- Perissomastix szunyoghyi Gozmány, 1969
- Perissomastix taeniaecornis (Walsingham, 1896)
- Perissomastix tihamaella Petersen & Gaedike, 1982
- Perissomastix titanea Gozmány, 1967
- Perissomastix topaz Gozmány, 1967
- Perissomastix varii Gozmány, 1967
- Perissomastix versicolor Gaedike, 2009
- Perissomastix wadimaidaq Gaedike, 2009
- Perissomastix wiltshirella (Petersen, 1964)
- Perissomastix zernyi Petersen, 1957
