= Lemurs' Park =

Bonatical garden and reserve in Madagascar

- Interactive map of Lemurs' Park
- 18°57′8.65″S 47°21′27.13″E
- Location: 22 km (14 mi) southwest of Antananarivo, Madagascar
- Land area: 5 ha (12 acres)
- No. of species: 9 lemur species; several reptile species, including chameleons, radiated tortoises, and iguanas
- Website: www.lemurspark.com

Lemurs' Park (also known locally as Parc de lémuriens à Madagascar) is a small botanical garden and lemur reserve covering 5 ha (12 acres), and is located 22 km (14 mi) southwest of Antananarivo, Madagascar. It was founded around 2000 by Laurent Amouric and Maxime Allorge. Most of its nine lemur species are free-ranging within the park, which also contains more than 70 of Madagascar's endemic plant species. The park is open to the public, offering guided tours as well as standard amenities, a gift shop, and a restaurant. Visitors can arrange transportation between downtown Antananarivo and Lemurs' Park on a private park shuttle.

Most of the park's lemurs were confiscated pets, entrusted to the park by the Ministry of Water and Forests. The lemurs are rehabilitated and bred for reintroduction into the wild. The park also collaborates with Colas Madagascar and TOTAL Madagascar to provide environmental education to local primary school children and to plant native trees as part of a reforestation program. Most of the park's staff come from the neighboring communities.

== History ==
Established around 2000, Lemurs' Park is a private, 5 ha (12 acres) botanical park situated next to the Katsaoka River and between the villages of Fenoarivo and Imerintsiatosika, 22 km (14 mi) southwest of Antananarivo along Route Nationale 1 (RN1) in the direction of Ampefy. It functions as a lemur reserve that gradually reintroduces captive-born lemurs back into nature. The park was founded by Laurent Amouric and Maxime Allorge, the grandson of Pierre Boiteau, Founding Director of the Tsimbazaza Zoo (Parc Botanique et Zoologique de Tsimbazaza) in Antananarivo.

== Attractions ==
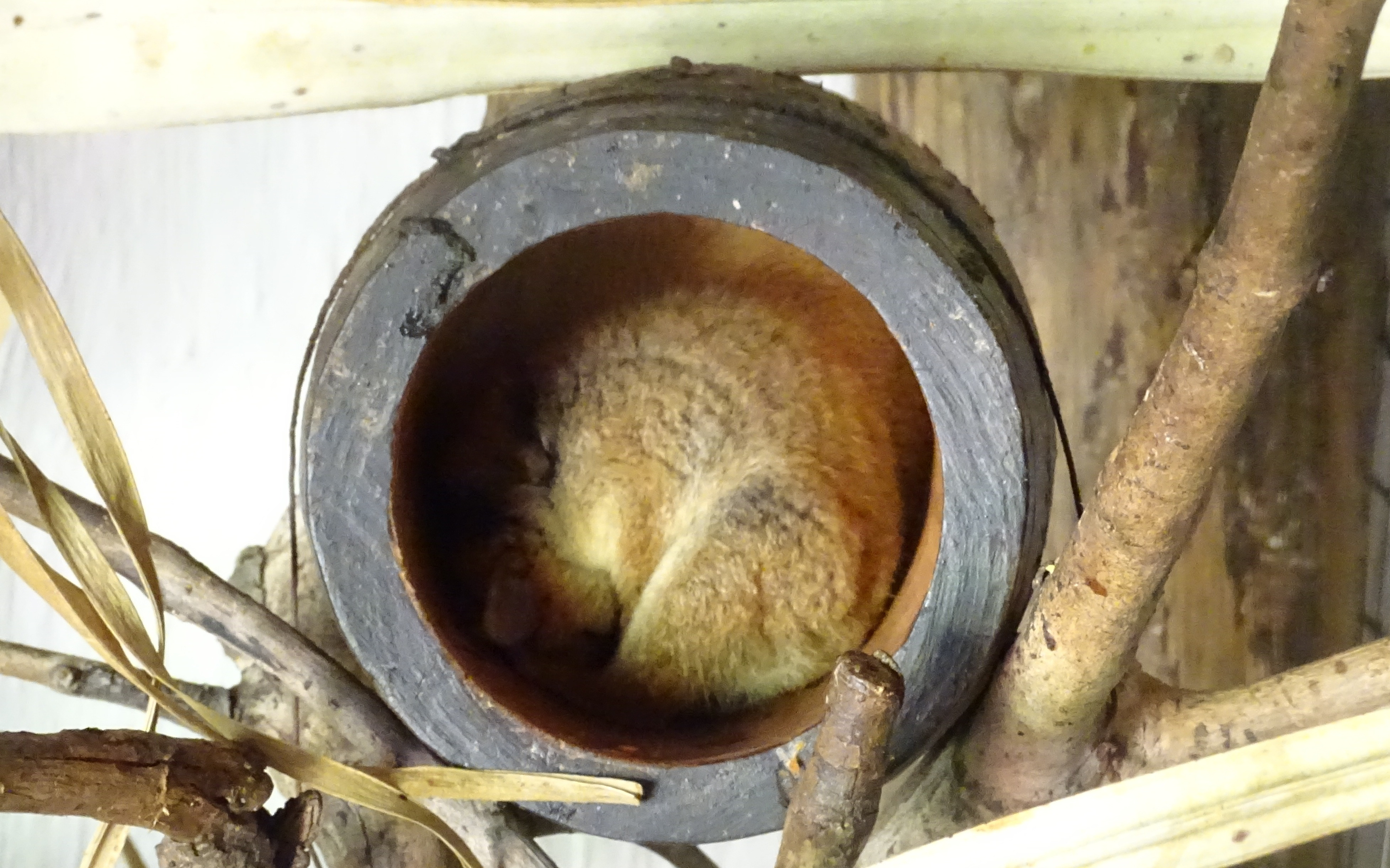
As of 2013, Lemurs' Park houses at least two species of cheirogaleid lemurs, which are small and nocturnal.

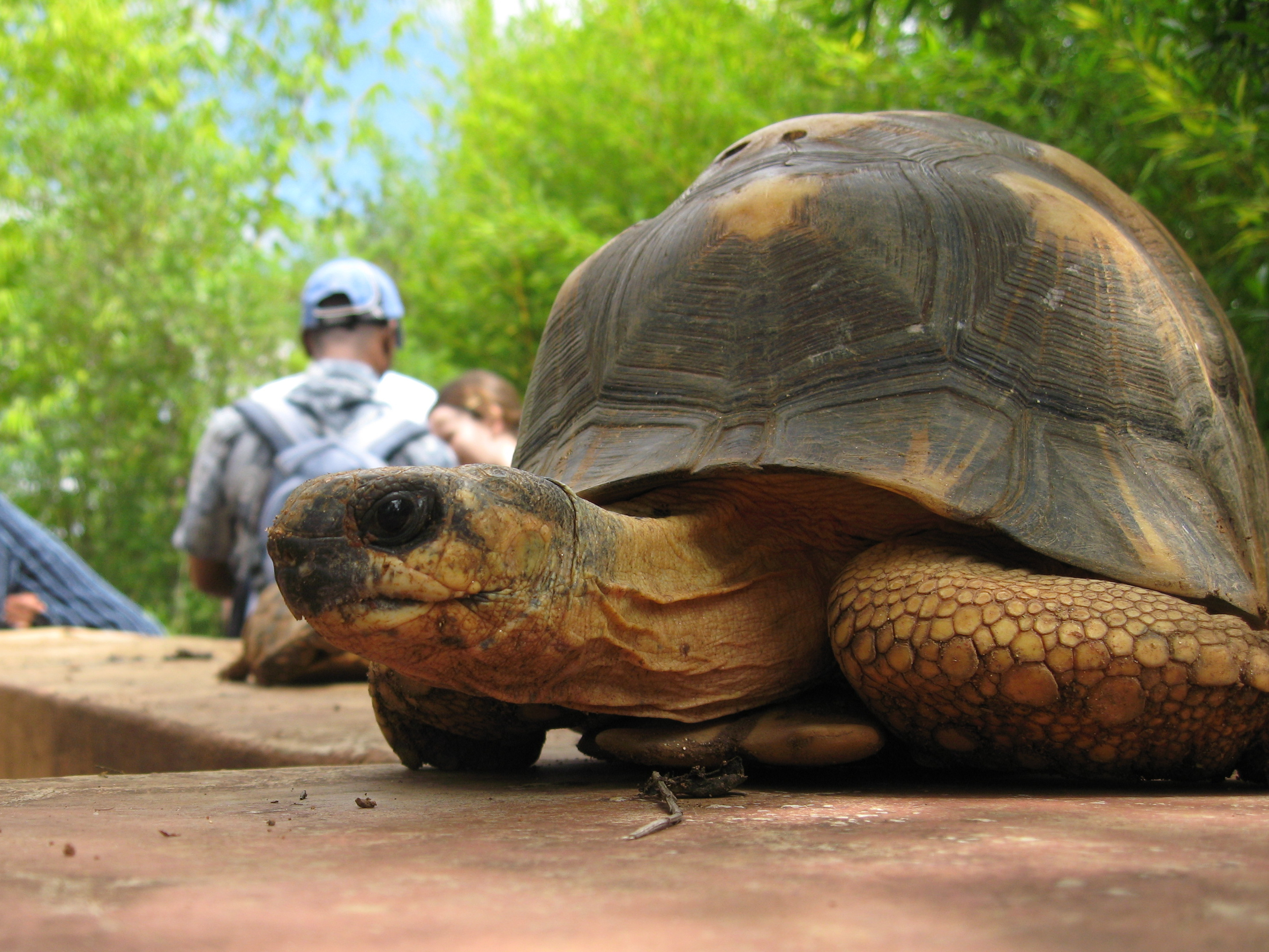
The park also has radiated tortoises and other reptiles.

The park, which primarily consists of pine forest and bamboo vegetation, contains nearly 6,000 trees and more than 70 plant species endemic to Madagascar, all of which are segregated into separate climatic zones throughout the park. Lemurs' Park also has a vivarium which houses chameleons, radiated tortoises, iguanas and other lizards.

The main attraction, for which the park is named, is its free-ranging lemurs. Featured daily feeding times occur every two hours between 10:00 a.m. and 4:00 p.m. There are nine species, seven of which are active during the day (diurnal) and two are active at night (nocturnal). Many of the lemurs are confiscated pets, and the staff work towards rehabilitating them for reintroduction into the wild.

Some of the lemurs found at Lemurs' Park as of 2013
Common name	Scientific name	Conservation status	Images
Black-and-white ruffed lemur	Varecia variegata	Critically endangered	
Common brown lemur	Eulemur fulvus	Near threatened	
Coquerel's sifaka	Propithecus coquereli	Endangered	
Crowned sifaka	Propithecus coronatus	Endangered	
Eastern lesser bamboo lemur	Hapalemur griseus	Vulnerable	
Mongoose lemur	Eulemur mongoz	Critically endangered	
Ring-tailed lemur	Lemur catta	Endangered	

== Conservation ==
Confiscated pet lemurs are entrusted to Lemurs' Park by the Ministry of Water and Forests (Ministère des eaux et Forêts) for ex situ conservation. This allows the urban population near Antananarivo to see free-ranging lemurs in a natural environment. In addition to rehabilitation, Lemurs' Park has also successfully bred Coquerel's sifakas (Propithecus coquereli) since 2007.

Because many of these lemurs have become endangered as a result of deforestation in Madagascar, Lemurs' Park participates in a reforestation program supported by Colas Madagascar and Total Madagascar. Between December 2008 and May 2013, approximately 37,163 students and 1,270 teachers from the public primary schools around Antananarivo have helped plant 170 native trees and participated in environmental education at Lemurs' Park. For many of the children, this program has allowed them to see free-ranging lemurs for the first time. In total, more than 11,000 trees have been planted as part of this collaborative project, including rosewood, Terminalia, and amontana as of May 2013. Saplings of endemic plants, including baobabs, from the Madagascar spiny thickets in the southern part of the island have also been transported to the park and planted with the help of Colas.

According to the park, the partnership with Colas Madagascar and TOTAL Madagascar has also helped prevent layoffs of its staff during difficult economic times, over 90% of whom come from the surrounding communities.

== Business details ==
Lemurs' Park (Parc de lémuriens à Madagascar) is open all year, seven days a week from 9:00 a.m. until 5:00 p.m., and the latest admission into the park is at 4:15 p.m. As of March 2015, the admission price was 25,000 ariary for adults and 10,000 ariary for children ages 4–12, while admission for children under the age of 4 is free. Entrance fees also cover a required tour with a park guide. Stays are limited to 1 hour and 30 minutes. The park provides standard amenities, and has a restaurant that requires 48-hour advance booking. Between January and April, both the restaurant and gift shop are closed on Mondays.

Visits to the park do not require advance booking, although reservations are required to take the park's minibus from the heart of Antananarivo (Analakely) to the facility. The cost of the shuttle includes the admission into the park. The shuttle departs at 9:00 a.m. and 2:00 p.m. each day.

Lemurs' Park also has a liaison office in Antananarivo that is only open on Monday.
