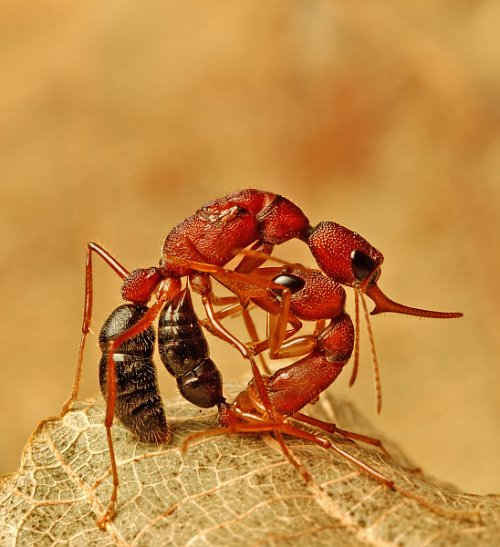
- Worker of H. saltator killing a foreign queen (top)

Scientific classification
- Kingdom: Animalia
- Phylum: Arthropoda
- Class: Insecta
- Order: Hymenoptera
- Family: Formicidae
- Genus: Harpegnathos
- Species: H. saltator

Binomial name
- Harpegnathos saltator (T. C. Jerdon, 1851)

Synonyms
- Drepanognathus saltator Jerdon, 1851

= Harpegnathos saltator =

Indian jumping ant

Species of ant

Harpegnathos saltator, sometimes called the Indian jumping ant or Jerdon's jumping ant, is a species of ant found in India. They have long mandibles and have the ability to leap a few inches. They are large-eyed and active predators that hunt mainly in the early morning. The colonies are small and the difference between workers and queens is very slight.

== Subspecies ==
- H. s. cruentatus (Smith, 1858)
- H. s. taprobanae (Forel, 1909)

== Habits ==
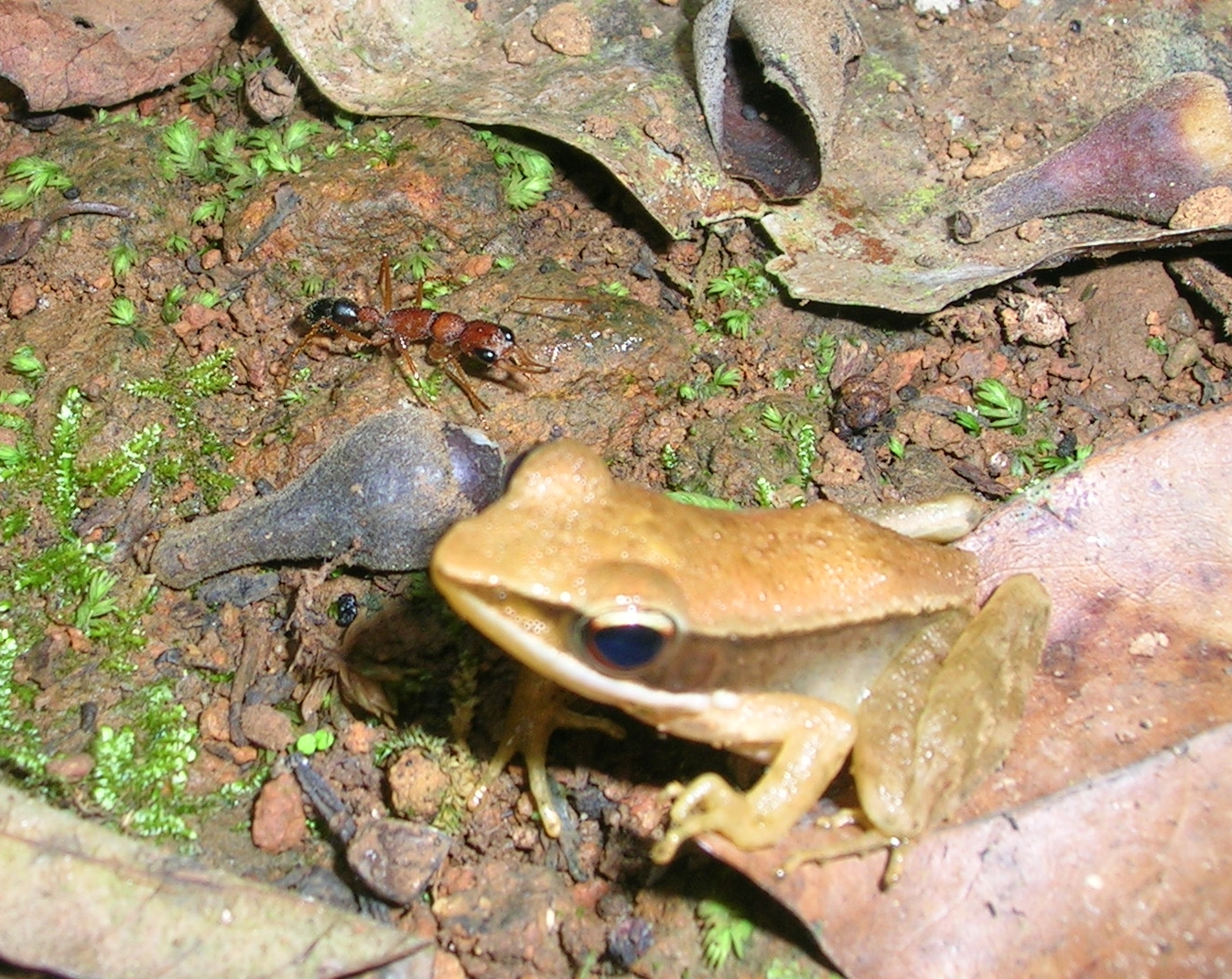
A Harpegnathos beside a frog (Indosylvirana sp.)

Unlike other ants, they are seen singly or in small groups and their colonies consist of very few individuals. They are also unusual amongst ants in that the queen–worker difference is very limited and some workers can mate and lay fertilized eggs just like the queen. These workers are termed gamergates. New colonies are founded independently by single queens, and on aging, they are replaced by several gamergates. The gamergates copulate with males from their own colonies, and being inbred, are related to the original founding queen. Colonies never undergo fission to form new colonies.

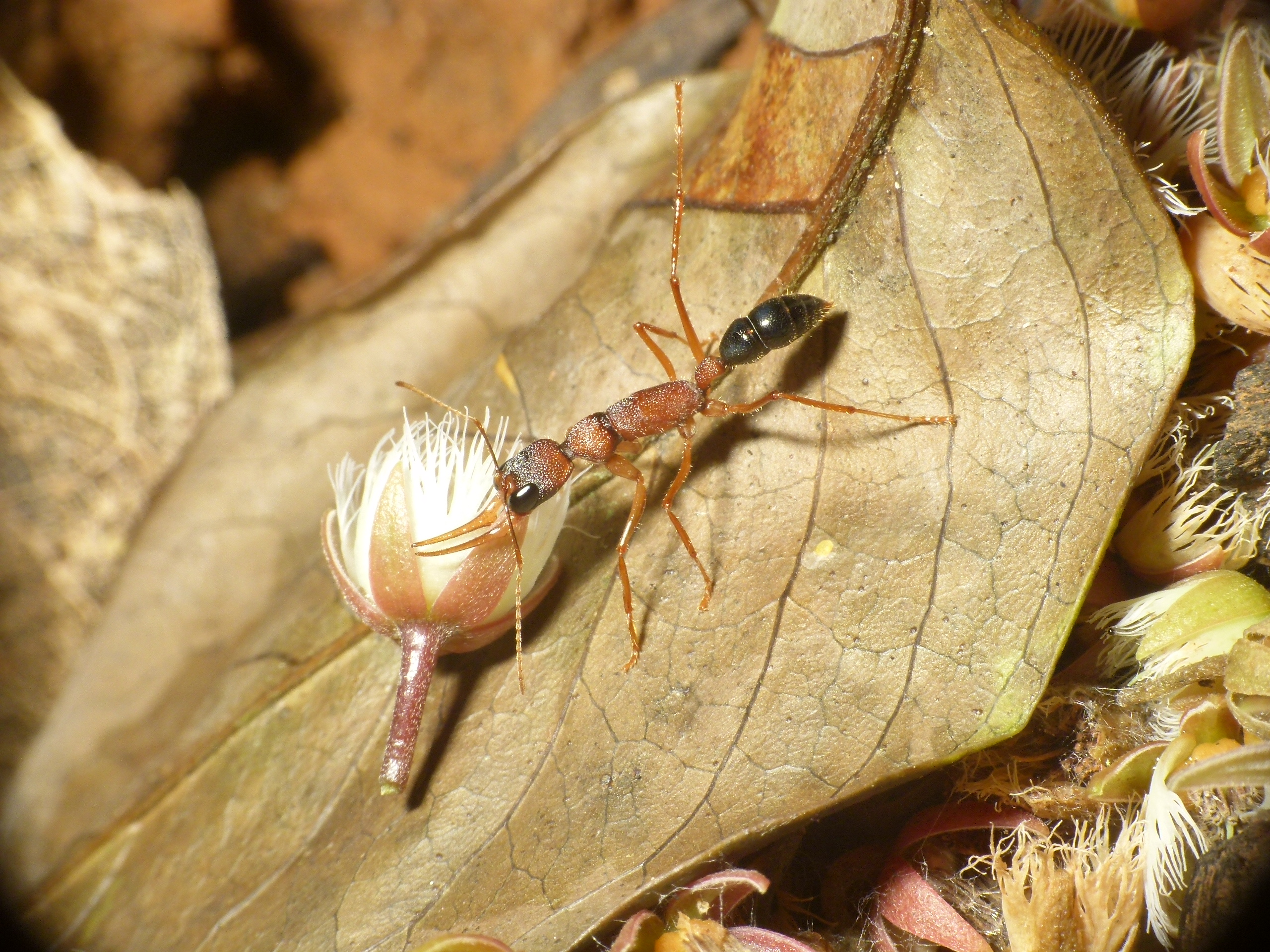
Carrying a flower of Elaeocarpus to the nest entrance

The workers limit the number of reproductives in the colony by policing new workers that try to lay eggs when an active queen or established gamergates are present. Workers use alarm pheromones that include 4-methyl-3-heptanone, 4-methyl-3-heptanol, and isopentyl isopentanoate. H. saltator, like many species of ants, produces 4-methyl-3-heptanone from mandibular glands. Dufour's gland secretions have been found to include a complex mixture of linear hydrocarbons from C_{15} to C_{25}, with (Z)-9-tricosene being the main constituent, along with other minor constituents such as tetradecyl propionate and traces of tetradecyl acetate and dodecyl acetate. Both the secretions from the postpharyngeal glands and the cuticular wax include methyl esters of common fatty acids.

Their leaps are accomplished by synchronized abduction of the middle and hind pairs of legs. They can jump up to 2 cm high and 10 cm far. These leaps are made not only to escape, but also to catch airborne prey. The workers forage only during the cool hours of the morning and afternoon with a lull in activity during midday.

The nest entrance is usually a low mound on the ground with the entrance surrounded by twigs and leaves. The nest entrance is closed by the ants in the evening, and is reopened in the day. The main chamber has a funnel-like opening in the antechamber, and this structure is believed to prevent flooding of the main chamber.

A study of the genome and expressed genes found that the production of enzymes that slow aging (telomerase and sirtuin deacetylases) are increased when workers turn into queens. The workers also undergo a reduction in their brain size upon becoming reproductives (or gamergates).

== Description ==
Possible colony lifecycles based on Peeters and Holldobler (1995)

The following is the original description by T. C. Jerdon.

Worker, head long, granulated; jaws with a strong tooth near the base pointing downwards and inwards, and thence gradually tapering to the tip, and finely serrated, 1–6th of an inch long; thorax barely grooved; abdominal pedicle small, low, ovate; abdomen very long; sting large; head and abdomen blackish brown, thorax and legs rufous – Length 3/4 of an inch.
I have not seen this remarkable Ant in the Carnatic. I first saw it at Tellicherry, and subsequently in other parts of Malabar. It is also found in the Mysore country as I learn from Mr. Hamilton, a most talented and industrious Amateur Entomologist.
I have given it the name of saltator from its power of making most surprising jumps which it does when alarmed or disturbed. It is very pugnacious, and bites, and stings very severely. It makes its nest under ground, generally about the roots of some plant. Its society does not consist of many individuals. It appears to feed on insects, which it often seizes alive.

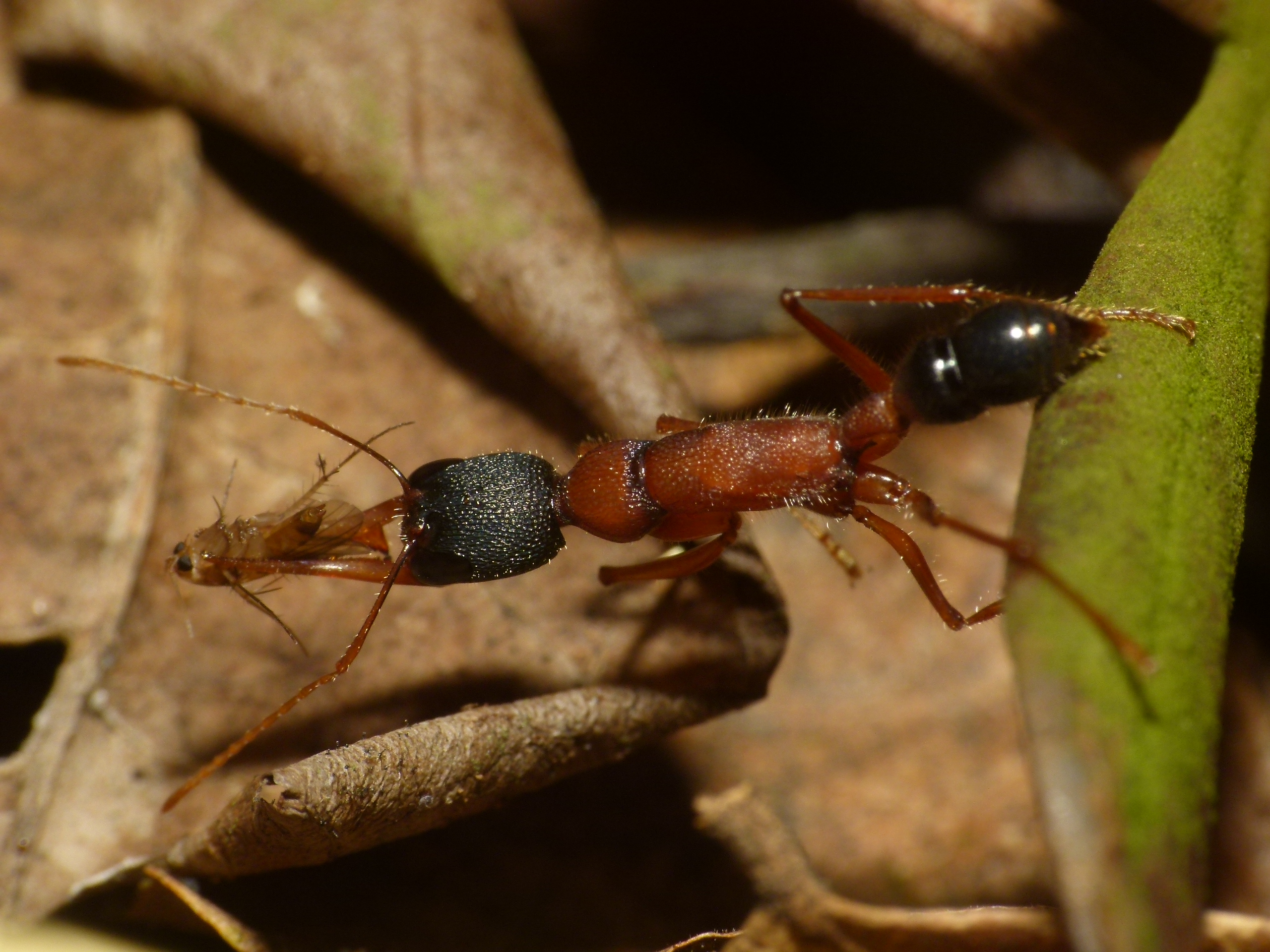
A black-headed form with prey

The following is the taxonomic description from C. T. Bingham's Fauna of British India (Hymenoptera – Volume 2):

- Worker: Head, thorax and pedicel ferruginous red, closely and rather coarsely punctured, granulated; abdomen black, shining, not granulated, with punctures finer and more scattered; mandibles, antennae, and legs yellow; the whole insect covered with short, sparse, erect pale hairs, and a minute, fine, sericeous shining pubescence on the mandibles, head, antennae, thorax, and legs, visible only in certain lights.
- Queen: Similar to the worker; the ocelli placed very low down, almost in the middle of the front of the head.
- Male: Mandibles short, triangular, rather wide, but not elongated. Head somewhat longer than broad, strongly constricted behind the eyes and up to the occipital articulation. Concavity in front shorter and broader than in D. venator. Posterior face of the metanotum strongly margined. First abdominal segment pyriform elongated as in D. venator. No constriction between the basal two segments. A small median carina is behind the occiput. Smooth and shining. Metanotum, pedicel and a part of the sides of the mesonotum coarsely rugose. Some foveae or obsolete striae on the rest of the thorax. Pilosity as in D. venator. Reddish brown, the pedicel darker. Abdomen brown. Legs and antennae pale testaceous. Wings hyaline, nervures, and stigma very pale. (Based on Forel)
