= Brian Fisher (entomologist) =

American entomologist (born 1964 or 1965)

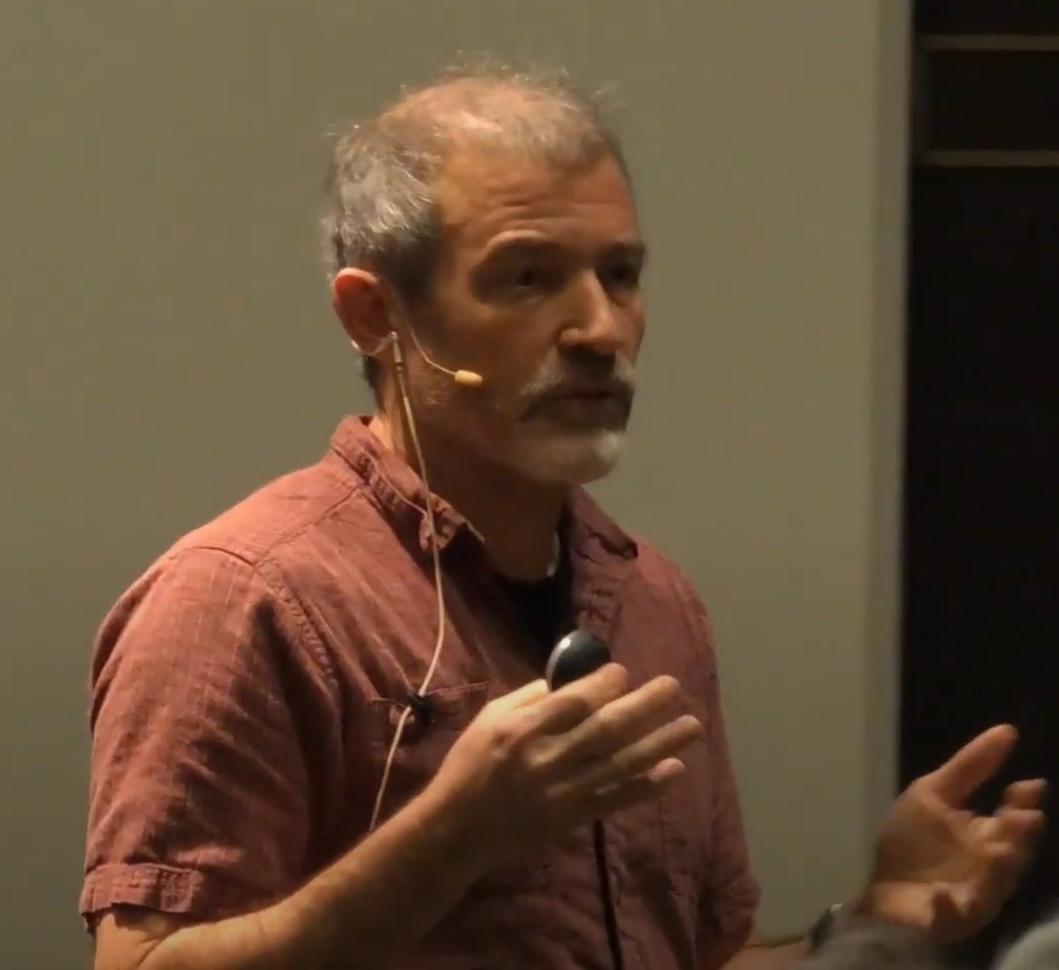
- Fisher in 2020
- Born: 1964 (59–60) or 1965 (58–59)
- Scientific career
- Fields: Entomology

Brian L. Fisher (born 1964 or 1965) is an American entomologist who works on the systematics of arthropods, with a particular focus on ants. He has discovered over 1000 species, including 900 species of ants in Madagascar. He mainly conducts field work in Madagascar and Africa.

== Career ==
After working with the Smithsonian Institution in Panama, Fisher received a PhD on ant systematics at UC Davis. He is the curator and chairman of the entomology department of the California Academy of Sciences. Fisher is also the present executive director of the Bibikely Biodiversity Institute and the Madagascar Biodiversity Center.

In 2002, Fisher created AntWeb, a database of ants. It costed US$30,000 to create.

He is known for naming Proceratium google after Google Inc.

The ant genus Fisheropone is named in his honour.

In 2016, Fisher launched IPSIO (Insects and People of the Southwest Indian Ocean). IPSIO was launched to develop a team approach to solving current conservation issues.

== Personal life ==
Fisher grew up in Normal, Illinois, and was inducted into the Pioneer Hall of Fame at Illinois State University Laboratory School.
