= Botanical and Zoological Garden of Tsimbazaza =

Botanical garden and zoo in Madagascar

- Parc Botanique et Zoologique de Tsimbazaza
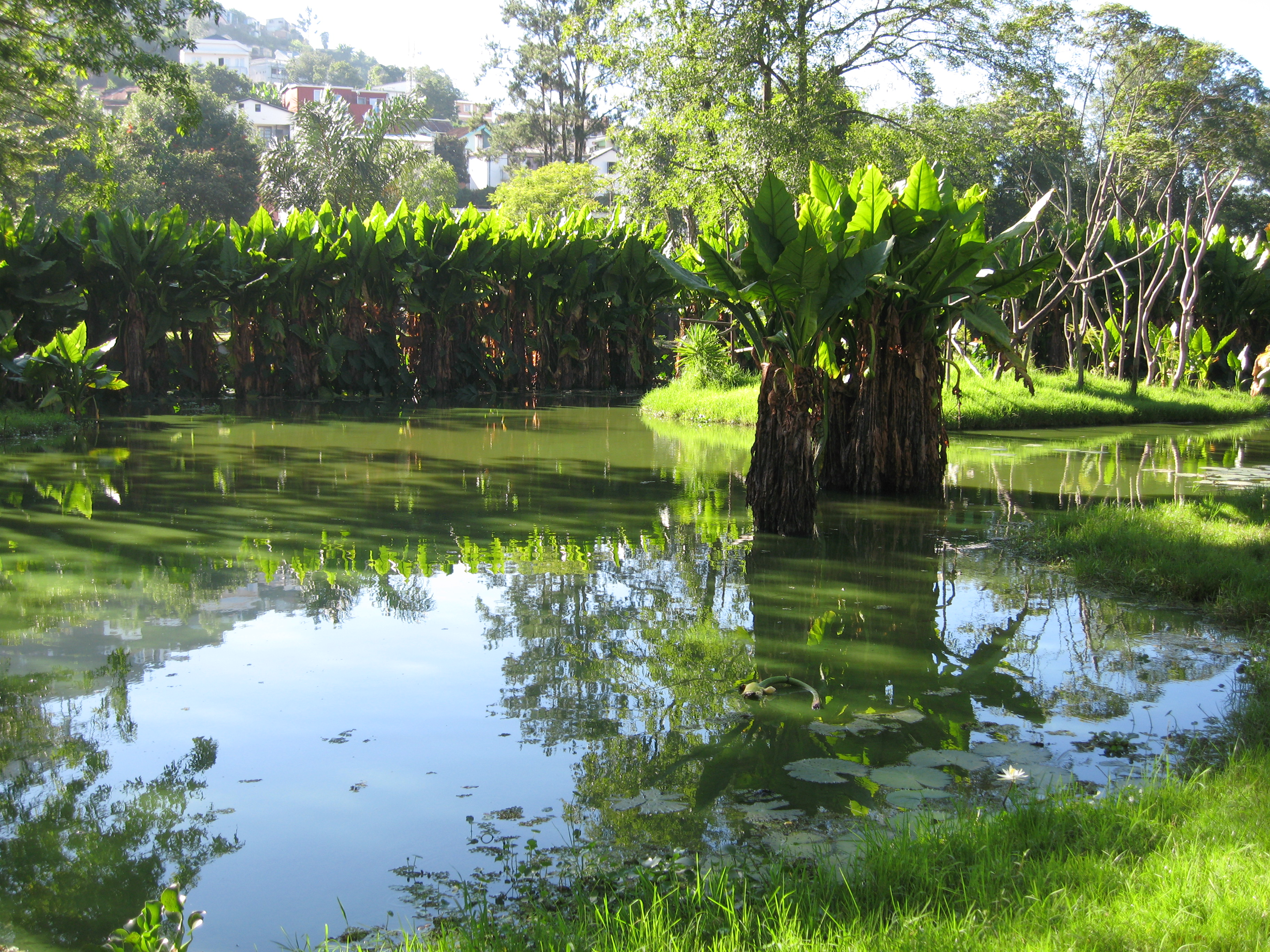
- Pond at Tsimbazaza, with Typhonodorum lindleyanum
- Interactive map of Botanical and Zoological Garden of Tsimbazaza
- Type: Botanical and zoological garden
- Location: Tsimbazaza, Antananarivo, Madagascar
- Coordinates: 18°55′48″S 47°31′34″E
- Area: 23 hectares (57 acres)
- Opened: 1990
- Collections: botanical and zoological
- Website: pbzt.recherches.gov.mg

The Botanical and Zoological Garden of Tsimbazaza (PBZT; French: Parc botanique et zoologique de Tsimbazaza; Malagasy: Valan-javamaniry amam binin' i Tsimbazaza) is a zoological and botanical garden in the neighbourhood of Tsimbazaza in Antananarivo, Madagascar, located just north of the National Assembly of Madagascar building.

It is said to house "the finest collection of Malagasy wildlife", with several unique species on display. The zoo has a museum with collections of tribal carvings and the skeleton of extinct megavertebrates, including an elephant bird, pygmy hippos, and giant lemurs. It also contains Madagascar's largest herbarium (herbarium code TAN) with roughly 80,000 plant specimens.

In November 1989, the WWF celebrated its tenth year in Madagascar by opening an environmental teaching center at the zoo.

Irish author Dervla Murphy described visiting a zoo in Antananarivo with her daughter in 1983, for the purposes of obtaining their lemur-reserve permits:

Tana's botanic garden-cum-zoo, skilfully laid out on a hillside, may once have been a delight but now rows of empty cages give it a stricken appearance – though we rejoiced that such cramped cages were empty [..] Most of the few surviving lemurs (ring-tailed) live on an isle in a lakelet...

== See also ==
- Madagascar Biodiversity Center
- List of museums in Madagascar
- Lemurs' Park
