= AntWeb =

Website documenting the known species of ants

- Website type: Biodiversity database
- Available in: English language
- Owner: Project Leader: Brian L. Fisher
- Website: www.antweb.org
- Commercial: no
- Launched: 2002
- Content license: Creative Commons Attribution-Share Alike

AntWeb is the leading online database on ants: storing specimens images and records, and natural history information, and documenting over 490,000 specimens across over 35,000 taxa of ants in its open source and community driven repository as of November 2014. It was set up by Brian L. Fisher in 2002, and cost US$30,000 to build.
