= List of current presidents of legislatures =

This is a list of current presiding officers of the legislative assemblies of sovereign and unrecognized states, autonomous regions, dependencies and other territories, sui generis entities, and international organisations.

== States recognised by the United Nations ==
State	Assembly	Title	Name	Political affiliation	Assumed office
Afghanistan	Leadership Council (Note: Advisory body)	Supreme Leader	Hibatullah Akhundzada	Taliban	15 August 2021
Albania	Parliament	Chairman	Niko Peleshi	Socialist	12 September 2025
Algeria (Parliament)	Council of the Nation	President	Azouz Nasri	Independent	19 May 2025
Algeria (Parliament)	People's National Assembly	President	Khalida Boufedeche	National Liberation Front	28 July 2026
Andorra	General Council	General Syndic	Carles Ensenyat Reig	Democrats for Andorra	26 April 2023
Angola	National Assembly	President	Carolina Cerqueira	MPLA	15 September 2022
Antigua and Barbuda (Parliament)	Senate	President	Alincia Williams-Grant	Labour	25 June 2014
Antigua and Barbuda (Parliament)	House of Representatives	Speaker	Osbert Frederick	Labour	18 November 2024
Argentina (National Congress)	Senate	President	Victoria Villarruel	La Libertad Avanza	10 December 2023
Argentina (National Congress)	Senate	Provisional President	Bartolomé Abdala	Libertarian Party	13 December 2023
Argentina (National Congress)	Chamber of Deputies	President	Martín Menem	La Libertad Avanza	10 December 2023
Armenia	National Assembly	President	Alen Simonyan	Civil Contract	2 August 2021
Australia (Parliament)	Senate	President	Sue Lines	Labor Party	26 July 2022
Australia (Parliament)	House of Representatives	Speaker	Milton Dick	Labor Party	26 July 2022
Austria (Parliament)	Federal Council	President	Christine Schwarz-Fuchs	People's Party	1 July 2026
Austria (Parliament)	National Council	President	Walter Rosenkranz	Freedom Party	24 October 2024
Azerbaijan	National Assembly	Speaker	Sahiba Gafarova	New Azerbaijan Party	10 March 2020
Bahamas (Parliament)	Senate	President	Lashell Adderley	Progressive Liberal Party	6 October 2021
Bahamas (Parliament)	House of Assembly	Speaker	Patricia Deveaux	Progressive Liberal Party	6 October 2021
Bahrain (National Assembly)	Consultative Council	Chairman	Ali Saleh Al-Saleh	Independent	15 December 2008
Bahrain (National Assembly)	Council of Representatives	Chairman	Ahmed bin Salman Al-Musallam	Independent	12 December 2022
Bangladesh	Jatiya Sangsad	Speaker	Hafiz Uddin Ahmad	Nationalist Party	12 March 2026
Barbados (Parliament)	Senate	President	Reginald Farley	Labour Party	15 September 2020
Barbados (Parliament)	House of Assembly	Speaker	Arthur Holder	Labour Party	5 June 2018
Belarus (National Assembly)	Council of the Republic	Speaker	Natalya Kochanova	Independent	6 December 2019
Belarus (National Assembly)	House of Representatives	Speaker	Igor Sergeenko	Communist Party	22 March 2024
Belgium (Parliament)	Senate	President	Vincent Blondel	Les Engagés	21 February 2025
Belgium (Parliament)	Chamber of Representatives	President	Peter De Roover	New Flemish Alliance	10 July 2024
Belize (National Assembly)	Senate	President	Carolyn Trench-Sandiford	People's United Party	11 December 2020
Belize (National Assembly)	House of Representatives	Speaker	Valerie Woods	People's United Party	11 December 2020
Benin	National Assembly	President	Joseph Djogbenou	Progressive Union Renewal	8 February 2026
Bhutan (Parliament)	National Council	Chairperson	Sangay Dorji	Independent	10 May 2023
Bhutan (Parliament)	National Assembly	Speaker	Lungten Dorji	People's Democratic Party	25 January 2024
Bolivia (Plurinational Legislative Assembly)	Plurinational Legislative Assembly	President	Edmand Lara	Christian Democratic Party	8 November 2025
Bolivia (Plurinational Legislative Assembly)	Chamber of Senators	President	Diego Ávila	Christian Democratic Party	6 November 2025
Bolivia (Plurinational Legislative Assembly)	Chamber of Deputies	President	Roberto Castro Salazar	Christian Democratic Party	6 November 2025
Bosnia and Herzegovina (Parliamentary Assembly)	House of Peoples	Chairperson	Kemal Ademović	Independent	16 October 2025
Bosnia and Herzegovina (Parliamentary Assembly)	House of Representatives	Chairperson	Darko Babalj	Serb Democratic Party	1 April 2026
Botswana	National Assembly	Speaker	Dithapelo Keorapetse	Umbrella for Democratic Change	7 November 2024
Brazil (National Congress)	Federal Senate	President	Davi Alcolumbre	Brazil Union	1 February 2025
Brazil (National Congress)	Chamber of Deputies	President	Hugo Motta	Republicanos	1 February 2025
Brunei	Legislative Council	Speaker	Abdul Rahman Mohamed Taib	Independent	11 February 2015
Bulgaria	National Assembly	Chairperson	Mihaela Dotsova	Citizens for European Development of Bulgaria	30 April 2026
Burkina Faso	Transitional National Assembly	President	Ousmane Bougouma	Independent	11 November 2022
Burundi (Parliament)	Senate	President	Gervais Ndirakobuca	National Council for the Defense of Democracy – Forces for the Defense of Democracy	5 August 2025
Burundi (Parliament)	National Assembly	President	Gelase Ndabirabe	National Council for the Defense of Democracy – Forces for the Defense of Democracy	7 August 2020
Cambodia (Parliament)	Senate	President	Hun Sen	People's Party	3 April 2024
Cambodia (Parliament)	National Assembly	President	Sudary Khuon	People's Party	22 August 2023
Cameroon (Parliament)	Senate	President	Aboubakary Abdoulaye	People's Democratic Movement	17 March 2026
Cameroon (Parliament)	National Assembly	President	Théodore Datouo	People's Democratic Movement	17 March 2026
Canada (Parliament)	Senate	Speaker	Raymonde Gagné	Independent	16 May 2023
Canada (Parliament)	House of Commons	Speaker	Francis Scarpaleggia	Liberal Party	26 May 2025
Cape Verde	National Assembly	Speaker	Janira Hopffer Almada	African Party for the Independence of Cape Verde	18 June 2026
Central African Republic	National Assembly	President	Simplice Sarandji	Independent	5 May 2021
Chad	Senate	President	Haroun Kabadi	Patriotic Salvation Movement	7 March 2025
Chad	National Assembly	President	Ali Kolotou Tchaïmi	Patriotic Salvation Movement	4 February 2025
Chile (National Congress)	Senate	President	Paulina Núñez Urrutia	National Renewal	11 March 2026
Chile (National Congress)	Chamber of Deputies	President	Jorge Alessandri Vergara	Independent Democratic Union	11 March 2026
China	National People's Congress	Chairman	Zhao Leji	Communist Party	10 March 2023
Colombia (Congress)	Senate	President	Honorio Henríquez	Democratic Centre	20 July 2026
Colombia (Congress)	Chamber of Representatives	President	Nicolás Barguil	Conservative Party	20 July 2026
Comoros	Assembly of the Union	Speaker	Moustadroine Abdou	Convention for the Renewal of Comoros	3 April 2020
(Republic of the Congo) Congo-Brazzaville (Parliament)	Senate	President	Pierre Ngolo	Party of Labour	12 September 2017
(Republic of the Congo) Congo-Brazzaville (Parliament)	National Assembly	President	Isidore Mvouba	Party of Labour	19 August 2017
(Democratic Republic of the Congo) Congo-Kinshasa (Parliament)	Senate	President	Sama Lukonde	Future of Congo	12 August 2024
(Democratic Republic of the Congo) Congo-Kinshasa (Parliament)	National Assembly	President	Aimé Boji	Union for the Congolese Nation	13 November 2025
Costa Rica	Legislative Assembly	Speaker	Yara Jiménez Fallas	Sovereign People's Party	1 May 2026
Croatia	Parliament	Speaker	Gordan Jandroković	Croatian Democratic Union	5 May 2017
Cuba	National Assembly of People's Power	President	Esteban Lazo Hernández	Communist Party	24 February 2013
Cyprus	House of Representatives	President	Annita Demetriou	Democratic Rally	10 June 2021
Czech Republic (Parliament)	Senate	President	Miloš Vystrčil	Civic Democratic Party	19 February 2020
Czech Republic (Parliament)	Chamber of Deputies	President	Tomio Okamura	Freedom and Direct Democracy	5 November 2025
Denmark	Folketing	Speaker	Søren Gade	Venstre	16 November 2022
Djibouti	National Assembly	President	Dileita Mohamed Dileita	Union for Presidential Majority	5 March 2023
Dominica	House of Assembly	Speaker	Joseph Isaac	Independent	10 February 2020
Dominican Republic (Congress)	Senate	President	Ricardo de los Santos Polanco	Mondern Revolutionary Party	16 August 2023
Dominican Republic (Congress)	Chamber of Deputies	President	Alfredo Pacheco	Mondern Revolutionary Party	16 August 2020
East Timor	National Parliament	President	Maria Fernanda Lay	Fretilin	22 June 2023
Ecuador	National Assembly	President	Niels Olsen Peet	National Delocratic Action	14 May 2025
Egypt	Senate	President	Essam El-Din Farid	Independent	18 October 2025
Egypt	House of Representatives	Speaker	Hisham Badawy	Independent	12 January 2026
El Salvador	Legislative Assembly	President	Ernesto Castro	Nuevas Ideas	1 May 2021
Equatorial Guinea (Parliament)	Senate	President	Teresa Efua Asangono	Democratic Party	12 July 2013
Equatorial Guinea (Parliament)	Chamber of Deputies	President	Gaudencio Mohaba Mesu	Democratic Party	12 July 2013
Eritrea	National Assembly	President	Isaias Afwerki	People's Front for Democracy and Justice	24 May 1993
Estonia	Riigikogu	President	Lauri Hussar	Estonia 200	10 April 2023
Eswatini (Parliament)	Senate	President	Lindiwe Dlamini	Independent	October 2018
Eswatini (Parliament)	House of Assembly	Speaker	Jabulani Mabuza	Independent	6 October 2023
Ethiopia (Federal Parliamentary Assembly)	House of Federation	Speaker	Agegnehu Teshager	Prosperity Party	4 October 2021
Ethiopia (Federal Parliamentary Assembly)	House of Peoples' Representatives	Speaker	Tagesse Chafo	Prosperity Party	18 October 2018
Fiji	Parliament	Speaker	Naiqama Lalabalavu	People's Alliance	24 December 2022
Finland	Parliament	Speaker	Jussi Halla-aho	Finns Party	20 June 2023
France (Parliament)	Senate	President	Gérard Larcher	The Republicans	1 October 2014
France (Parliament)	National Assembly	President	Yaël Braun-Pivet	Rennaisance	28 June 2022
Gabon (Parliament)	Senate	President	Huguette Nyana Ekoume	Democratic Union of Builders	17 December 2025
Gabon (Parliament)	National Assembly	President	Régis Onanga Ndiaye	Democratic Union of Builders	17 November 2025
Gambia	National Assembly	Speaker	Fabakary Jatta	Alliance for Patriotic Reorientation and Construction	17 April 2022
Georgia	Parliament	Chairperson	Shalva Papuashvili	Georgian Dream	29 December 2021
Germany (Federal Assembly)	Bundesrat	President	Hendrik Wüst	Christian Democratic Union	1 November 2026
Germany (Federal Assembly)	Bundestag	President	Julia Klöckner	Christian Democratic Union	25 March 2025
Ghana	Parliament	Speaker	Alban Bagbin	National Democratic Congress	7 January 2021
Greece	Parliament	Speaker	Nikitas Kaklamanis	New Democracy	22 January 2025
Grenada (Parliament)	Senate	President	Dessima Williams		31 August 2022
Grenada (Parliament)	House of Representatives	Speaker	Leo Cato	National Democratic Congress	31 August 2022
Guatemala	Congress	President	Nery Ramos	Blue Party	14 January 2024
Guinea	National Assembly	President	Amadou Damaro Camara	Rally of the Guinean People	22 April 2020
Guinea-Bissau	National People's Assembly	President	Tomás Djassi	Military	12 December 2025
Guyana	National Assembly	Speaker	Manzoor Nadir	People's Progressive Party/Civic	1 September 2020
Haiti (Parliament)	Senate	President	Vacant	TBD	TBD
Haiti (Parliament)	Chamber of Deputies	Speaker	Vacant	TBD	TBD
Honduras	National Congress	President	Tomás Zambrano	Saviour Party	20 January 2026
Hungary	National Assembly	Speaker	Ágnes Forsthoffer	Tisza	9 May 2026
Iceland	Althing	Speaker	Þórunn Sveinbjarnardóttir	Social Democratic Alliance	5 February 2025
India (Parliament)	Rajya Sabha	Chairperson	C. P. Radhakrishnan	Independent	12 September 2025
India (Parliament)	Rajya Sabha	Deputy Chairperson	Harivansh Narayan Singh	Janata Dal (United)	9 August 2018
India (Parliament)	Lok Sabha	Speaker	Om Birla	Bharatiya Janata Party	19 June 2019
Indonesia (People's Consultative Assembly)	People's Consultative Assembly	Speaker	Ahmad Muzani	Gerindra Party	4 October 2024
Indonesia (People's Consultative Assembly)	Regional Representative Council	Speaker	Sultan Bachtiar Najamudin	Independent	2 October 2024
Indonesia (People's Consultative Assembly)	People's Representative Council	Speaker	Puan Maharani	Democratic Party of Struggle	1 October 2019
Iran	Islamic Consultative Assembly	Speaker	Mohammad Bagher Ghalibaf	Progress and Justice Polupation	28 May 2020
Iran	Assembly of Experts	Chairman	Mohammad-Ali Movahedi Kermani	Combatant Clergy Association	21 May 2024
Iraq	Council of Representatives	Speaker	Haibat al-Halbousi	Progress Party	29 December 2025
Ireland (Oireachtas)	Seanad Éireann	Cathaoirleach	Mark Daly	Fianna Fáil	12 February 2025
Ireland (Oireachtas)	Dáil Éireann	Ceann Comhairle	Verona Murphy	Independent	18 December 2024
Israel	Knesset	Speaker	Matan Kahana	Yashar	17 November 2026
Italy (Parliament)	Senate	President	Ignazio La Russa	Brothers of Italy	13 October 2022
Italy (Parliament)	Chamber of Deputies	President	Lorenzo Fontana	Lega Nord	14 October 2022
Ivory Coast (Parliament)	Senate	President	Kandia Camara	Rally of the Republicans	12 October 2023
Ivory Coast (Parliament)	National Assembly	President	Patrick Achi	Rally of Houphouëtists for Democracy and Peace	17 January 2026
Jamaica (Parliament)	Senate	President	Tom Tavares-Finson	Labour Party	10 March 2016
Jamaica (Parliament)	House of Representatives	Speaker	Juliet Holness	Labour Party	26 September 2023
Japan (National Diet)	House of Councillors	President	Masakazu Sekiguchi	Liberal Democratic Party	11 November 2024
Japan (National Diet)	House of Representatives	Speaker	Eisuke Mori	Liberal Democratic Party	16 February 2026
Jordan (Parliament)	Senate	President	Faisal al-Fayez	Independent	25 October 2015
Jordan (Parliament)	House of Representatives	Speaker	Ahmed Safadi	Independent	15 November 2022
Kazakhstan (Parliament)	Senate	Chairman	Mäulen Äşimbaev	Amanat	4 May 2020
Kazakhstan (Parliament)	Mazhilis	Chairman	Erlan Qoşanov	Amanat	1 February 2022
Kenya (Parliament)	Senate	Speaker	Amason Kingi	Kenya Kwanza	8 September 2022
Kenya (Parliament)	National Assembly	Speaker	Moses Wetangula	Kenya Kwanza	8 September 2022
Kiribati	House of Assembly	Speaker	Tangariki Reete	Boutokaan Moa Party	22 May 2020
Kuwait	National Assembly	Speaker	Ahmed Al-Sadoun	Independent	18 October 2022
Kyrgyzstan	Supreme Council	Chairman	Marlen Mamataliev	Yntymak	12 February 2026
Laos	National Assembly	President	Sonexay Siphandone	People's Revolutionary Party	5 October 2026
Latvia	Saeima	Speaker	Edvards Smiltēns	Latvian Association of Regions	3 November 2026
Lebanon	Parliament	Speaker	Nabih Berri	Amal Movement	20 October 1992
Lesotho (Parliament)	Senate	President	Tlohang Sekhamane	Revolution for Prosperity	25 October 2022
Lesotho (Parliament)	National Assembly	Speaker	Sephiri Motanyane		12 June 2017
Liberia (Legislature)	Senate	President	Jeremiah Koung	Movement for Democracy and Reconstruction	22 January 2024
Liberia (Legislature)	Senate	President pro tempore	Nyonblee Karnga-Lawrence	United Party	15 January 2024
Liberia (Legislature)	House of Representatives	Speaker	Johnathan Koffa	Congress for Democratic Change	15 January 2024
Libya	General National Congress	President	Nouri Abusahmain	Independent	4 August 2014
Libya	House of Representatives	President	Aguila Saleh Issa	Independent	4 August 2014
Liechtenstein	Landtag	President	Manfred Kaufmann	Patriotic Union	10 April 2025
Lithuania	Seimas	Speaker	Juozas Olekas	Social Democratic Party	10 September 2025
Luxembourg	Chamber of Deputies	President	Claude Wiseler	Christian Social People's Party	21 November 2023
Madagascar (Parliament)	Senate	President	Richard Ravalomanana	Young Malagasies Determined	14 October 2023
Madagascar (Parliament)	National Assembly	President	Justin Tokely	IRMAR	11 July 2024
Malawi	National Assembly	Speaker	Sameer Suleman	Democratic Progressive Party	29 October 2025
Malaysia (Parliament)	Dewan Negara	President	Awang Bemee Awang Ali Basah	Gabungan Party Sarawk – Parti Pesaka Bumiputera Bersatu	22 July 2024
Malaysia (Parliament)	Dewan Rakyat	Speaker	Johari Abdul	Pakatan Harapan – People's Justice Party	19 December 2022
Maldives	People's Majlis	Speaker	Abdul Raheem Abdulla	People's National Congress	28 May 2024
Mali	National Assembly	President	Vacant	TBD	TBD
Malta	House of Representatives	Speaker	Carmelo Abela	Labour Party	20 June 2026
Marshall Islands	Legislature	Speaker	Brenson Wase	Independent	3 January 2024
Mauritania (Parliament)	National Assembly	President	Mohamed Ould Meguett	Equity Party	19 June 2023
Mauritius	National Assembly	Speaker	Shirin Aumeeruddy-Cziffra	Independent	29 November 2024
Mexico (Congress)	Senate of the Republic	President	Higinio Martínez	Morena	1 September 2026
Mexico (Congress)	Chamber of Deputies	President	Raúl Bolaños Cacho Cué	Ecologist Green Party	1 September 2026
Micronesia	Congress	Speaker	Esmond Moses	Independent	11 May 2023
Moldova	Parliament	President	Igor Grosu	Party of Action and Solidarity	29 July 2021
Monaco	National Council	President	Thomas Brezzo	Priorité Monaco	3 April 2024
Mongolia	State Great Khural	Chairman	Sandagiin Byambatsogt	People's Party	3 April 2026
Montenegro	Parliament	President	Andrija Mandić	New Serb Democracy	30 October 2023
Morocco (Parliament)	House of Councillors	President	Hakim Benchamach	National Rally of Independents	9 October 2021
Morocco (Parliament)	House of Representatives	President	Rachid Talbi Alami	National Rally of Independens	9 October 2021
Mozambique	Assembly of the Republic	Speaker	Margarida Talapa	FRELIMO	13 January 2025
Myanmar (Pyidaungsu Hluttaw)	Pyidaungsu Hluttaw	Speaker	Aung Lin Dwe	Union Solidarity and Development Party	20 March 2026
Myanmar (Pyidaungsu Hluttaw)	Amyotha Hluttaw	Speaker	Aung Lin Dwe	Union Solidarity and Development Party	18 March 2026
Myanmar (Pyidaungsu Hluttaw)	Pyithu Hluttaw	Speaker	Khin Yi	Union Solidarity and Development Party	16 March 2026
Namibia (Parliament)	National Council	Chairperson	Lukas Sinimbo Muha	SWAPO Party	15 December 2020
Namibia (Parliament)	National Assembly	Speaker	Peter Katjavivi	SWAPO Party	20 March 2015
Nauru	Parliament	Speaker	Marcus Stephen	Independent	27 August 2019
Nepal (Parliament)	National Assembly	Chairperson	Narayan Prasad Dahal	Nepali Communist Party	12 March 2024
Nepal (Parliament)	House of Representatives	Speaker	Dol Prasad Aryal	Rastriya Swatantra Party	5 April 2026
Netherlands (States General)	Senate	President	Mei Li Vos	Labour Party	7 October 2025
Netherlands (States General)	House of Representatives	Speaker	Thom van Campen	People's Party for Freedom and Democracy	18 November 2025
New Zealand	House of Representatives	Speaker	Gerry Brownlee	National Party	5 December 2023
Nicaragua	National Assembly	President	Gustavo Porras Cortés	Sandinista National Liberation Front	9 January 2017
Niger	National Assembly	President	Vacant	TBD	TBD
Nigeria (National Assembly)	Senate	President	Godswill Akpabio	All Progressives Congress	13 June 2023
Nigeria (National Assembly)	House of Representatives	Speaker	Tajudeen Abbas	All Progressives Congress	13 June 2023
North Korea	Supreme People's Assembly	Standing Committee Chairman	Yong-won Jo	Worker's Party	22 March 2026
North Korea	Supreme People's Assembly	Chairman	Yong-won Jo	Worker's Party	22 March 2026
North Macedonia	Assembly of the Republic	President	Afrim Gashi	Alternative	28 May 2024
Norway	Storting	President	Masud Gharahkhani	Labour Party	25 November 2021
Oman (Council)	Council of State	Chairman	Abdulmalik Al Khalili	Independent	18 August 2020
Oman (Council)	Consultative Assembly	Chairman	Khalid Al Mawali	Independent	29 October 2011
Pakistan (Parliament)	Senate	Chairman	Yusuf Raza Gilani	People's Party	9 April 2024
Pakistan (Parliament)	National Assembly	Speaker	Ayaz Sadiq	Muslim League (N)	1 March 2024
Palau (National Congress)	Senate	President	Hokkons Baules	Independent	19 January 2017
Palau (National Congress)	House of Delegates	Speaker	Gibson Kanai	Independent	16 January 2025
Palestine	Legislative Council	Speaker	Aziz Dweik	Hamas	18 February 2006
Panama	National Assembly	President	Shirley Castañedas	Panameñista Party	1 July 2026
Papua New Guinea	National Parliament	Speaker	Job Pomat	Independent	2 August 2017
Paraguay (Congress)	Senate	President	Silvio Ovelar	National Republican Association	1 July 2023
Paraguay (Congress)	Chamber of Deputies	Speaker	Raúl Luís Latorre	National Republican Association	1 July 2023
Peru (Congress)	Senate	President	Miki Torres	Popular Force	26 July 2026
Peru (Congress)	Chamber of Deputies	President	Óscar Reto	Party of Good Government	26 July 2026
Philippines (Congress)	Senate	President	Sherwin Gatchalian	Nationalist People's Coalition	17 June 2026
Philippines (Congress)	House of Representatives	Speaker	Bojie Dy	Federal Party	17 September 2025
Poland (National Assembly)	Senate	Marshal	Małgorzata Kidawa-Błońska	Civic Platform	13 November 2023
Poland (National Assembly)	Sejm	Marshal	Włodzimierz Czarzasty	New Left	18 November 2025
Portugal	Assembly of the Republic	President	José Pedro Aguiar-Branco	Social Democratic Party	27 March 2024
Qatar	Consultative Assembly	Chairman	Hassan bin Abdulla Al-Ghanim	Independent	27 October 2021
Romania (Parliament)	Senate	President	Mircea Abrudean	National Liberal Party	24 June 2025
Romania (Parliament)	Chamber of Deputies	President	Sorin Grindeanu	Social Democratic Party	24 June 2025
Russia (Federal Assembly)	Federation Council	Chairwoman	Valentina Matviyenko	United Russia	21 September 2011
Russia (Federal Assembly)	State Duma	Chairman	Vyacheslav Volodin	United Russia	5 October 2016
Rwanda (Parliament)	Senate	President	François-Xavier Kalinda	Social Democratic Party	9 January 2023
Rwanda (Parliament)	Chamber of Deputies	President	Gertrude Kazarwa	Liberal Party	14 August 2024
Saint Kitts and Nevis	National Assembly	Speaker	Lanien Blanchette	Labour Party	25 October 2022
Saint Lucia (Parliament)	Senate	President	Alvina Reynolds	Labour Party	24 November 2022
Saint Lucia (Parliament)	House of Assembly	Speaker	Claudius Francis	Labour Party	17 August 2021
Saint Vincent and the Grenadines	House of Assembly	Speaker	Ronnia Durham-Balcombe	New Democratic Party	23 December 2025
Samoa	Legislative Assembly	Speaker	Auapaʻau Mulipola Aloitafua	Samoa United in Faith	16 September 2025
San Marino	Grand and General Council	Captains Regent	Alice Mina	Christian Democratic Party	1 April 2026
San Marino	Grand and General Council	Captains Regent	Vladimiro Selva	Libera	1 April 2026
São Tomé and Príncipe	National Assembly	Speaker	Celmira Sacramento	Independent Democratic Action	8 November 2022
Saudi Arabia	Consultative Assembly	Speaker	Abdullah ibn Muhammad Al ash-Sheikh	Independent	28 February 2009
Senegal	National Assembly	President	Malick Ndiaye	Patriots of Senegal	2 December 2024
Serbia	National Assembly	President	Aleksandar Čupić	Student List	17 November 2026
Seychelles	National Assembly	Speaker	Azarel Ernesta	United Seychelles	28 October 2025
Sierra Leone	Parliament	Speaker	Abass Bundu	People's Party	25 April 2018
Singapore	Parliament	Speaker	Seah Kian Peng	People's Action Party	2 August 2023
Slovakia	National Council	Speaker	Richard Raši	Voice – Social Democracy	26 March 2025
Slovenia (Parliament)	National Council	President	Marko Lotrič	Independent	19 December 2022
Slovenia (Parliament)	National Assembly	Speaker	Zoran Stevanović	Resni.ca	10 April 2026
Solomon Islands	National Parliament	Speaker	Patteson Oti	Ownership, Unity and Responsibility Party	15 May 2019
Somalia (Federal Parliament)	Senate	Speaker	Abdi Hashim Abdelahi	Independent	22 January 2017
Somalia (Federal Parliament)	House of the People	Speaker	Aden Madobe	Independent	28 April 2022
South Africa (Parliament)	National Council of Provinces	Chairperson	Refilwe Mtsweni-Tsipane	African National Congress	15 June 2024
South Africa (Parliament)	National Assembly	Speaker	Thoko Didiza	African National Congress	14 June 2024
South Korea	National Assembly	Speaker	Jeong-sik Cho	Independent	5 June 2026
South Sudan (National Legislature)	Council of States	Speaker	Joseph Bol Chan	People's Liberation Movement	5 August 2011
South Sudan (National Legislature)	National Legislative Assembly	Speaker	Jemma Nunu Kumba	People's Liberation Movement	2 August 2021
Spain (Cortes Generales)	Senate	President	Pedro Rollán	People's Party	17 August 2023
Spain (Cortes Generales)	Congress of Deputies	President	Francina Armengol	Socialist Workers' Party	17 August 2023
Sri Lanka	Parliament	Speaker	Jagath Wickramaratne	National People's Power	17 December 2024
Sudan	Transitional Legislative Council	Speaker	Vacant	TBD	TBD
Suriname	National Assembly	Chairperson	Ashwin Adhin	National Democratic Party	28 June 2025
Sweden	Riksdag	Speaker	Andreas Norlén	Moderate Party	24 September 2018
Switzerland (Federal Assembly)	Council of States	President	Stefan Engler	The Centre	1 December 2025
Switzerland (Federal Assembly)	National Council	President	Pierre-André Page	People's Party	1 December 2025
Syria	People's Assembly	Speaker	Abdul Hamid al-Awak	Independent	12 July 2026
Tajikistan (Supreme Assembly)	National Assembly	Chairman	Rustam Emomali	People's Democratic Party	17 April 2020
Tajikistan (Supreme Assembly)	Assembly of Representatives	Chairman	Fayzali Idizoda	People's Democratic Party	19 March 2025
Tanzania	National Assembly	Speaker	Mussa Zungu	Chama Cha Mapinduzi	10 November 2025
Thailand (National Assembly)	National Assembly	President	Sophon Saram	Bhumjaithai Party	16 March 2026
Thailand (National Assembly)	Senate	President	Mongkol Surasajja	Independent	26 July 2024
Thailand (National Assembly)	House of Representatives	Speaker	Sophon Saram	Bhumjaithai Party	16 March 2026
Togo	Senate	President	Barry Moussa Barqué	Union for the Republic	2 April 2025
Togo	National Assembly	President	Kodjo Adedze	Union for the Republic	14 June 2024
Tonga	Legislative Assembly	Speaker	ʻAlipate Tuʻivanuavou Vaea	Independent	15 December 2025
Trinidad and Tobago (Parliament)	Senate	President	Wade Mark	Independent	23 May 2025
Trinidad and Tobago (Parliament)	House of Representatives	Speaker	Jagdeo Singh	Independent	23 May 2025
Tunisia (Parliament)	National Council of Regions and Districts	President	Imed Derbali	Independent	19 April 2024
Tunisia (Parliament)	Assembly of the Representatives of the People	President	Ibrahim Bouderbala	Independent	13 March 2023
Turkey	Grand National Assembly	Speaker	Numan Kurtulmuş	Justice and Development Party	7 June 2023
Turkmenistan	Assembly	Chairwoman	Dünýägözel Gulmanowa	Democratic Party	6 April 2023
Tuvalu	Parliament	Speaker	Iakoba Italeli	Independent	27 February 2024
Uganda	Parliament	Speaker	Anita Among	National Resistance Movement	25 March 2022
Ukraine	Verkhovna Rada	Chairman	Ruslan Stefanchuk	Servant of the People	8 October 2021
United Arab Emirates	Federal National Council	Speaker	Saqr Ghobash	Independent	14 November 2019
United Kingdom (Parliament)	House of Lords	Lord Speaker	Michael Forsyth	Independent	1 May 2021
United Kingdom (Parliament)	House of Commons	Speaker	Lindsay Hoyle	Independent	4 November 2019
United States (Congress)	Senate	President	JD Vance	Republican Party	20 January 2025
United States (Congress)	Senate	President pro tempore	Chuck Grassley	Republican Party	3 January 2025
United States (Congress)	House of Representatives	Speaker	Mike Johnson	Republican	25 October 2023
Uruguay (General Assembly)	Senate	President	Carolina Cosse	Broad Front	1 March 2025
Uruguay (General Assembly)	Chamber of Deputies	President	Rodrigo Goñi Reyes	National Party	1 March 2026
Uzbekistan (Oliy Majlis)	Senate	Chairwoman	Tanzila Norbaeva	Independent	21 June 2019
Uzbekistan (Oliy Majlis)	Legislative Chamber	Chairman	Nuriddinjon Ismailov	Liberal Democratic Party	12 January 2015
Vanuatu	Parliament	Speaker	Stephen Dorrick Felix	Leaders Party	11 February 2025
Vatican City	Pontifical Commission	President	Raffaella Petrini	Independent	1 March 2025
Vatican City	College of Cardinals	Dean	Luis Antonio Tagle	Independent	18 January 2020
Venezuela	National Assembly	President	Jorge Rodríguez	United Socialist Party	5 January 2021
Venezuela	National Assembly	President	Dinorah Figuera (disputed)	Justice First	5 January 2023
Vietnam	National Assembly	Chairman	Trần Thanh Mẫn	Communist Party	20 May 2024
Yemen	House of Representatives	Speaker	Sultan al-Barakani	General People's Congress	13 April 2019
Zambia	National Assembly	Speaker	Nelly Mutti	United Party for National Development	3 September 2021
Zimbabwe (Parliament)	Senate	President	Mabel Chinomona	African National Union – Patriotic Front	11 September 2018
Zimbabwe (Parliament)	House of Assembly	Speaker	Jacob Mudenda	African National Union – Patriotic Front	3 September 2013

== States recognised by at least one United Nations member ==
State	Assembly	Title	Name	Party	Assumed office
Abkhazia	People's Assembly	Speaker	Lasha Ashuba	Independent	12 April 2022
Kosovo	Assembly	Speaker	Albulena Haxhiu	Vetëvendosje	11 February 2026
Northern Cyprus	Assembly of the Republic	Speaker	Ziya Öztürkler	National Unity Party	21 October 2024
Somaliland (Parliament)	House of Elders	Speaker	Muse Haji Abdi Duale	Independent	12 June 2026
Somaliland (Parliament)	House of Representatives	Speaker	Abdirizak Khalif	Waddani	3 August 2021
South Ossetia	Parliament	Speaker	Alan Margiev	Nykhas	24 June 2024
Republic of China (Taiwan)	Legislative Yuan	President	Han Kuo-yu	Kuomintang	1 February 2024
Sahrawi Arab Democratic Republic	National Council	President	Bashir Mustafa Sayed	Polisario Front	28 March 2026

== States not recognised by any United Nations members and governments in exile ==
State	Assembly	Title	Name	Party	Assumed office
Central Tibetan Administration	Parliament	Speaker	Dolma Tsering Teykhang	Independent	31 May 2026
Transnistria	Supreme Council	Speaker	Tatyana Zalevskaya	Renewal Republican Party	4 December 2025

== Autonomous regions, dependencies and other territories ==
Region or territory	Country	Assembly	Title	Name	Assumed office
Adjara	Georgia	Supreme Council	Chairperson	Tsotne Ananidze	2 April 2026
Åland	Finland	Legislative Assembly	Speaker	Ingrid Zetterman	3 November 2023
Alderney	United Kingdom	States	President	William Tate	28 June 2019
American Samoa (Fono)	United States	Senate	President	Tuaolo Fruean	8 January 2021
American Samoa (Fono)	United States	House of Representatives	Speaker	Savali Talavou Ale	4 January 2007
Andalusia	Spain	Parliament	President	Jesús Aguirre	14 July 2022
Anguilla	United Kingdom	House of Assembly	Speaker	Tara Carter	11 March 2025
Aosta Valley	Italy	Regional Council	President	Alberto Bertin	20 October 2020
Aragon	Spain	Cortes	President	María Navarro	3 March 2026
Aruba	Netherlands	Estates	President	Edgar Vrolijk	8 July 2021
Ascension Island	United Kingdom	Island Council	Governor	Philip Rushbrook	4 May 2019
Ascension Island	United Kingdom	Island Council	Administrator	Nigel Phillips	13 August 2022
Asturias	Spain	General Junta	President	Juan Cofiño	26 June 2023
Azad Kashmir	Pakistan	Legislative Assembly	Speaker	Chaudhry Latif Akbar	3 June 2023
Azores	Portugal	Legislative Assembly	President	Luís Garcia	16 November 2020
Balearic Islands	Spain	Parliament	President	Gabriel Le Senne	20 June 2023
Bangsamoro	Philippines	Parliament	Speaker	Pangalian Balindong	29 March 2019
Barbuda	Antigua and Barbuda	Council	Chairperson	John Mussington	7 April 2025
Basque Country	Spain	Parliament	President	Bakartxo Tejeria	20 November 2012
Bavaria	Germany	Landtag	President	Ilse Aigner	5 November 2018
Bermuda (Parliament)	United Kingdom	Senate	President	Joan Dillas-Wright	8 September 2017
Bermuda (Parliament)	United Kingdom	House of Assembly	Speaker	Dennis Lister	2017
Bougainville	Papua New Guinea	House of Representatives	Speaker	Simon Pentanu	15 June 2015
British Virgin Islands	United Kingdom	House of Assembly	Speaker	Corine George-Massicote	26 May 2022
Canary Islands	Spain	Parliament	President	Astrid Pérez	27 June 2023
Cantabria	Spain	Parliament	President	María José González Revuelta	22 June 2023
Castile and León	Spain	Cortes	President	Carlos Pollán	10 March 2022
Castilla–La Mancha	Spain	Cortes	President	Pablo Bellido	19 June 2019
Catalonia	Spain	Parliament	President	Josep Rull	10 June 2024
Cayman Islands	United Kingdom	Parliament	Speaker	Ezzard Miller	6 May 2025
Ceuta	Spain	Assembly	President	Juan Jesús Vivas	8 February 2001
Cook Islands	New Zealand	Parliament	Speaker	Tai Tura	22 March 2021
Corsica	France	Assembly	President	Marie-Antoinette Maupertuis	1 July 2021
Curaçao	Netherlands	Estates	President	Fergino Brownbill	11 May 2025
Extremadura	Spain	Assembly	President	Manuel Naharro	20 January 2026
Falkland Islands	United Kingdom	Legislative Assembly	Speaker	Keith Biles	27 February 2009
Faroe Islands	Denmark	Løgting	Speaker	Johan Dahl	13 April 2026
Flanders	Belgium	Parliament	Speaker	Liesbeth Homans	2 October 2019
French Polynesia	France	Assembly	President	Antony Géros	11 May 2023
Friuli-Venezia Giulia	Italy	Regional Council	President	Mauro Bordin	
Gagauzia	Moldova	People's Assembly	Chairperson	Nicolai Ormanji (acting)	27 November 2025
Galicia	Spain	Parliament	President	Miguel Santalices	26 January 2016
Gibraltar	United Kingdom	Parliament	Speaker	Karen Ramagge Prescott	10 November 2023
Greenland	Denmark	Inatsisartut	Speaker	Kim Kielsen	7 April 2025
Guam	United States	Legislature	Speaker	Therese M. Terlaje	4 January 2021
Guernsey	United Kingdom	States	Bailiff	Richard McMahon	12 May 2020
Hong Kong	China	Legislative Council	President	Starry Lee	8 January 2026
Iraqi Kurdistan	Iraq	Parliament	Speaker	Rewaz Fayeq	11 July 2019
Isle of Man (Tynwald)	United Kingdom	Tynwald	President	Laurence Skelly	20 July 2021
Isle of Man (Tynwald)	United Kingdom	Legislative Council	President	Laurence Skelly	20 July 2021
Isle of Man (Tynwald)	United Kingdom	House of Keys	Speaker	Juan Watterson	27 September 2016
Jersey	United Kingdom	States Assembly	Bailiff	Robert MacRae	24 October 2025
Karakalpakstan	Uzbekistan	Jokargi Kenes	Chairperson	Amanbai Orynbaev	26 August 2022
La Rioja	Spain	Parliament	President	Marta Fernández Cornago	22 June 2023
Macau	China	Legislative Assembly	President	Cheong Weng Chon	16 October 2025
Madeira	Portugal	Legislative Assembly	President	José Manuel Rodrigues	15 October 2019
Madrid	Spain	Assembly	President	Enrique Ossorio	13 June 2023
Melilla	Spain	Assembly	President	Juan José Imbroda	7 July 2023
Montserrat	United Kingdom	Legislative Assembly	Speaker	Teresina Bodkin	17 December 2019
Murcia	Spain	Assembly	President	Alberto Castillo	11 June 2019
Nakhchivan	Azerbaijan	Supreme Assembly	Chairperson	Bakhtiyar Mammadov	26 September 2024
Navarre	Spain	Parliament	President	Unai Hualde	19 June 2019
New Caledonia	France	Congress	President	Virginie Ruffenach	10 July 2026
Northern Ireland	United Kingdom	Assembly	Speaker	Edwin Poots	3 February 2024
Northern Mariana Islands (Commonwealth Legislature)	United States	Senate	President	Edith DeLeon Guerrero	9 January 2023
Northern Mariana Islands (Commonwealth Legislature)	United States	House of Representatives	Speaker	Edmund Villagomez	13 January 2021
Niue	New Zealand	Assembly	Speaker	Billy Talagi	13 May 2026
Pitcairn Islands	United Kingdom	Island Council	Mayor	Simon Young	1 January 2023
Puerto Rico (Legislative Assembly)	United States	Senate	President	José Luis Dalmau	23 February 2021
Puerto Rico (Legislative Assembly)	United States	House of Representatives	Speaker	Tatito Hernández	2 January 2021
Saint Barthélemy	France	Territorial Council	President	Xavier Lédée	3 April 2022
Saint Helena	United Kingdom	Legislative Council	Speaker	Maureen Thompson	11 September 2025
Saint Martin	France	Territorial Council	President	Daniel Gibbs	2 April 2017
Saint Pierre and Miquelon	France	Territorial Council	President	Bernard Briand	13 October 2020
Sardinia	Italy	Regional Council	President	Michele Pais	9 April 2019
Sark	United Kingdom	Chief Pleas	Speaker	Arthur Rolfe	
Scotland	United Kingdom	Parliament	Presiding Officer	Kenneth Gibson	14 May 2026
Sicily	Italy	Regional Assembly	Presiding Officer	Gianfranco Miccichè	5 November 2017
Sint Maarten	Netherlands	Estates	President	William Marlin	25 September 2019
South Tyrol	Italy	Landtag	President	Josef Noggler	25 January 2019
Tokelau	New Zealand	General Fono	Speaker	Kelihiano Kalolo	13 March 2023
Tobago	Trinidad and Tobago	House of Assembly	Presiding Officer	Abby Taylor	9 December 2021
Tristan da Cunha	United Kingdom	Island Council	Administrator	Philip Kendall	September 2023
Turks and Caicos Islands	United Kingdom	Parliament	Speaker	Gordon Burton	5 March 2021
U.S. Virgin Islands	United States	Legislature	President	Novelle Francis	9 January 2023
Val d'Aran	Spain	Conselh Generau	Síndic	Maria Vergés Pérez	29 October 2020
Valencian Community	Spain	Corts	President	Llanos Massó	26 June 2023
Vojvodina	Serbia	Assembly	President	Momo Čolaković	6 November 2023
Wales	United Kingdom	Parliament	Presiding Officer	Huw Irranca-Davies	12 May 2026
Wallis and Futuna	France	Territorial Assembly	President	Munipoese Muliʻakaʻaka	25 March 2022
Wallonia	Belgium	Parliament	President	Jean-Claude Marcourt	13 September 2019

== Sui generis entities ==
Entity	Assembly	Title	Name	Assumed office
European Union	Council of Ministers	Presidents	Denmark	1 July 2025
European Union	Parliament	President	Roberta Metsola	11 January 2022
Sovereign Military Order of Malta	Council Complete of State	Grand Commander	Emmanuel Rousseau	3 September 2022
Sovereign Military Order of Malta	Chapter General	Grand Master	John T. Dunlap	3 May 2023

== International organisations ==
There are several international parliaments, some that are directly elected and some that are appointed from among member states respective legislatures in the form of an inter-parliamentary institution.

Organisation	Assembly	Title	Name	Assumed office
(Organisation of African, Caribbean and Pacific States) African, Caribbean and Pacific Group of States	Parliamentary Assembly	President	Netty Baldeh	21 October 2015
African Parliamentary Union	Parliament	President	Rachid Talbi Alami	4 November 2014
African Union	Parliament	President	Roger Nkodo Dang	27 May 2015
Andean Community	Parliament	President	Cristina Reyes Hidalgo	14 July 2023
Arab League	Parliament	Speaker	Abdel Al Asoomi	October 2020
Asia Cooperation Dialogue	Parliamentary Assembly	President	Nayyar Hussain Bukhari	9 December 2013
Benelux Union	Parliament	President	Gusty Graas	1 January 2019
British–Irish Council	Parliamentary Assembly	Co-chair(s)	Frank Feighan; Laurence Robertson	21 October 2014; 1 December 2011
Central American Integration System	Parliament	President	Silvia García Polanco	October 2021
(European Union) Cotonou Partnership	Joint Parliamentary Assembly	Co-president(s)	Carlos Zorrinho; Peter Kenilorea	
Commonwealth of Independent States	Interparliamentary Assembly	Chairperson	Valentina Matviyenko	21 September 2011
Commonwealth of Nations	Parliamentary Association	President	Shirin Sharmin Chaudhury	9 October 2014
Community of Latin American and Caribbean States	Parliament	President	Gabriela Rivadeneira	16 February 2016
Council of the Baltic Sea States	Assembly	President	Jānis Vucāns	1 January 2016
Council of Europe	Assembly	President	iliane Maury Pasquier	July 2018
East African Community	Legislative Assembly	Speaker	Daniel Kidega	19 December 2014
(European Union) Eastern Partnership	Parliamentary Assembly	Co-president(s)	Victor Dolidze; Marian Lupu	17 March 2015; 16 February 2016
Economic Community of Central African States	Parliament	President	Santiago Nchama	4 June 2015
(ECOWAS) Economic Community of West African States	Parliament	Speaker	Moustapha Cissé	4 February 2016
(France) Assembly of French Citizens Abroad	Assembly	President	Hélène Degryse	5 December 2021
Inter-Parliamentary Union	Assembly	President	Saber Hossain Chowdhury	16 October 2014
(Organisation internationale de la Francophonie) International Organisation of La Francophonie	Parliamentary Assembly	President	François Paradis	
Latin America, the Caribbean and the European Union Summit	Parliamentary Assembly	Co-president(s)	Ramón Jáuregui Atondo; Roberto Requião	6 May 2015; 6 May 2015
Mercosur	Parliament	President	Jorge Taiana	1 January 2016
Nordic Council	Parliamentary Assembly	President	Henrik Dam Kristensen	2016
(NATO) North Atlantic Treaty Organisation	Assembly	President	Michał Szczerba	3 October 2023
Organization for Security and Co-operation in Europe	Parliamentary Assembly	President	Gigi Tsereteli	November 2017
Organisation of Islamic Cooperation	Parliamentary Union	Secretary General	Mouhamed Khouraichi Niass	
Turkic Council	Parliamentary Assembly	Chairperson	Baktykozha Izmukhambetov	28 March 2016
(European Union) Union for the Mediterranean	Parliamentary Assembly	President	Lhou Lmarbouh	8 January 2016
United Nations	General Assembly	President	Khalilur Rahman	8 September 2026

== See also ==
- List of legislatures by country
- List of current dependent territory leaders
- List of current defence ministers
- List of current finance ministers
- List of current foreign ministers
- List of current heads of state and government
- List of current interior ministers
- List of current legislatures
- List of current permanent representatives to the United Nations
- List of current state leaders by date of assumption of office
- List of current vice presidents
- List of heads of state by diplomatic precedence
- List of spouses of heads of state
- List of state leaders by year
- Lists of office-holders
