= Parliamentary assembly =

Parliamentary assembly may refer to:

- National Parliament, a type of state legislative assembly body
- Assembly of national parliaments, an inter-parliamentary institution of state national legislatures
- International parliament, a supranational legislative body of intergovernmental organization
- The Parliamentary Assembly of the Council of Europe

== See also ==
- Franco-German Parliamentary Assembly
