= Inter-parliamentary institution =

Type of parliamentary assembly

An inter-parliamentary institution (also known as Inter-parliamentary assembly) is an organization of more than one national legislatures (parliament, assembly, council and other types).

Most of the inter-parliamentary institutions are part of an intergovernmental organization. Such branches of intergovernmental organizations are typically established in order to provide for representation of citizens, rather than governments who are represented in other bodies within the organization. Most of the inter-parliamentary institutions have an assembly comprising members of the national legislatures (whose members are directly elected in most cases). Most of the inter-parliamentary institutions do not hold legislative power and have a consulting or informal cooperation-stimulating role.

When the intergovernmental organization chooses to operate through a hybrid system of not only intergovernmentalism, but also supranationalism an organization-level legislature is established (or a predecessor inter-parliamentary institution is granted legislative power) in the form of international parliament. Members of international parliaments could be assigned in the same way as members of inter-parliamentary institutions or in cases of more advanced supranationalism they could be directly elected.

== List of inter-parliamentary institutions ==
Since 1949, more than 40 parliamentary assemblies have been brought into being.

Inter-parliamentary institutions
Name	Sessions	Direct election	Legislative power	Related organization and notes
Inter-Parliamentary Union (IPU)	1889 –	no	no	none
ASEAN Inter Parliamentary Assembly (AIPA)	1977 –	no	no	Association of Southeast Asian Nations (ASEAN)
Parliamentary Assembly of the Council of Europe (PACE)	1949 –	no	no	CoE
European Parliament (Note: The initially consultative European Parliamentary Assembly of ECSC, EEC and Euratom subsequently was renamed, gained legislative powers and became directly elected.)	1952 –	1979	1970	EU
Nordic Council	1953 –	no	no	none
Benelux Parliament	1955 –	no	no	Benelux Economic Union
Assembly of the Western European Union	1955–2011	no	no	WEU that dissolved and was effectively succeeded by the EU.
NATO Parliamentary Assembly	1955 –	no	no	NATO
Latin American Parliament	1964 –	no	no	none (Note: Multiple regional organizations in Latin America such as the Rio Group, Latin American Economic System and Latin American Integration Association have similar membership.)
African Parliamentary Union	1976 –	no	no	none
Andean Parliament	1979 –	no	no	CAN
British Irish Parliamentary Assembly	1990 –	no	no	none (Note: Multiple regional organizations in the British Isles have similar membership.)
Interparliamentary Assembly on Orthodoxy	1994 –	no	no	
Central American Parliament	1991 –	no	no	SICA
Baltic Assembly	1991 –	no	no	none
Parliamentary Assembly of the Organization for Security and Co-operation in Europe	1992 –	no	no	OSCE
CIS Interparliamentary Assembly	1992 –	no	no	CIS
Parliamentary Union of the OIC Member States	1999 –	no	no	OIC
Asian Parliamentary Assembly	1999 –	no	no	none (Note: The Asian Cooperation Dialogue continental organization has similar membership.)
ACP–EU Joint Parliamentary Assembly	2000 –	no	no	none (Note: Parliamentary Assembly established by the Cotonou Agreement between the European Union and the African, Caribbean and Pacific Group of States.)
East African Legislative Assembly	2001 –	no	no	EAC
Inter-Parliamentary Assembly of the Eurasian Economic Community	2002 –	no	no	EurAsEC
Arab Parliament	2004 –	no	no	AL
Pan African Parliament	2004 –	no (Note: There are proposals to transform the Pan African Parliament into a directly elected international parliament with legislative powers.)	no	AU
Parliamentary Assembly of the Mediterranean (PAM)	2005 -	no	no	none
Euro-Latin American Parliamentary Assembly	2006 –	no	no	none (Note: Established by the parliaments of the European Union, Mercosur, Andean Community, Central American Integration System, Mexico, Chile and the Latin American Parliament.)
Mercosur Parliament	2007 –	2014 (Note: The Mercosur Parliament is expected to transform into a directly elected international parliament in 2014.)	no	Mercosur
Parliamentary Assembly of Turkic-speaking Countries	2008 –	no	no	Cooperation Council of Turkic Speaking States
Parliamentary Assembly of the Union for the Mediterranean (PA-UfM) (Note: Absorbing the Euro-Mediterranean Parliamentary Assembly)	2010 -	no	no	Union of the Mediterranean
Franco-German Parliamentary Assembly	2019 –	no	no	France–Germany relations
Assembly of Caribbean Community Parliamentarians		no		CARICOM
Inter-Parliamentary Committee of the West African Economic and Monetary Union		no		UEMOA
Parliament of the Economic Community of West African States		no		ECOWAS
Assemblée parlementaire de la Francophonie		no	no	OdLF
Euronest Parliamentary Assembly	2011-	no	no	none (Note: Related to the Eastern Partnership initiative of the EU's European Neighborhood Policy.)
(European Union) (United Kingdom) EU–UK Parliamentary Partnership Assembly	2020-	no	no	United Kingdom–European Union relations
South American Parliament	proposed			UNASUR
United Nations Parliamentary Assembly	proposed			UN
Parliamentary assembly of the World Trade Organization	proposed			WTO

== See also ==
- Parliamentary assembly
- List of national legislatures
- Commonwealth Parliamentary Association
