= Interparliamentary Assembly on Orthodoxy =

Organization

- Διακοινοβουλευτική Συνέλευση Ορθοδοξίας; Межпарламентская Ассамблея Православия

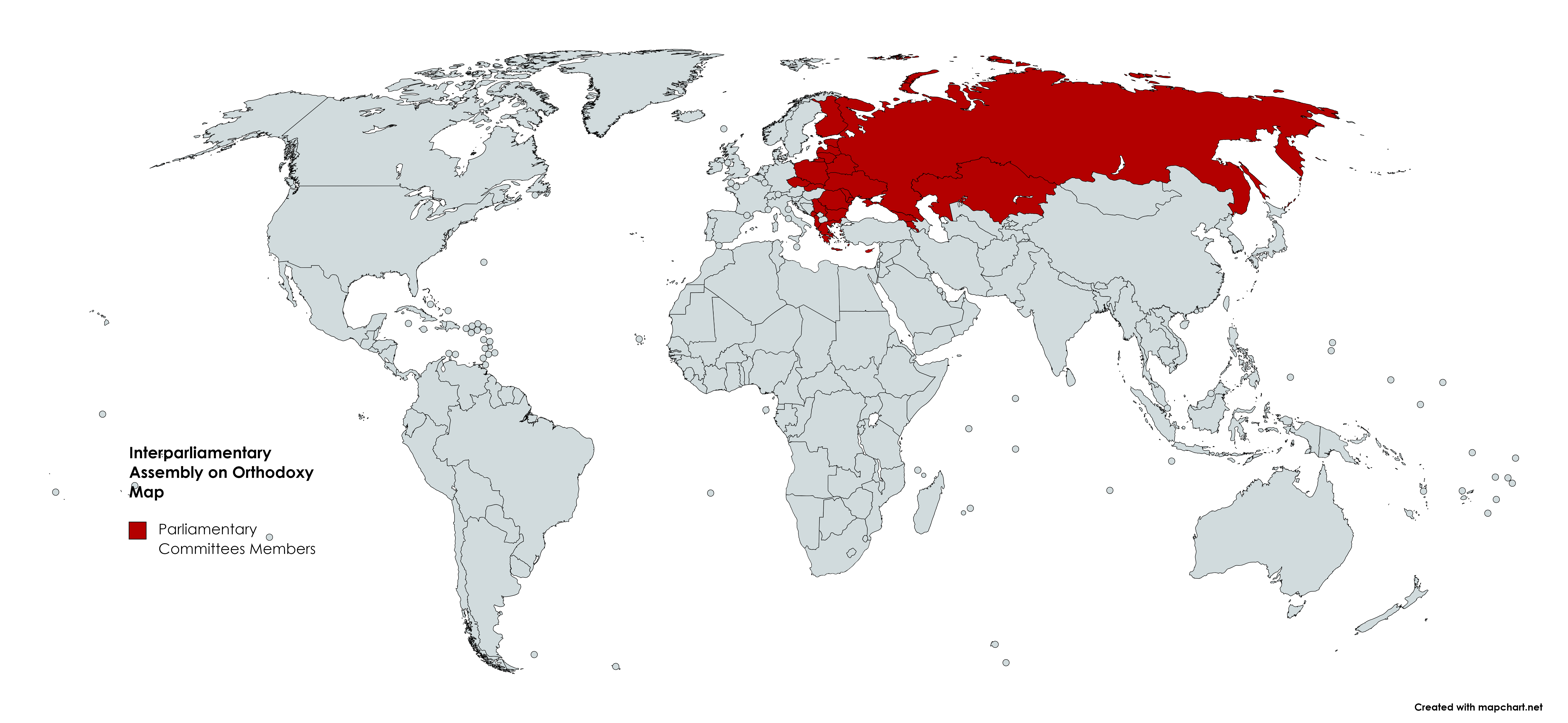
- Interparliamentary Assembly on Orthodoxy map
- Abbreviation: I.A.O.
- Formation: 5 November 1994
- Type: Religious inter-parliamentary institution
- Headquarters: 22-24 Vas. Amalias St. Athens, Greece
- Location: Europe
- Members: Parliamentary committees of 21 national parliaments
- Official language: Greek, Russian, English, French
- Secretary General: Maximos Charakopoulos
- President of the General Assembly: Eugeniusz Czykwin
- Board of directors: International Secretariat
- Main organ: General Assembly
- Website: eiao.org

The Interparliamentary Assembly on Orthodoxy (Greek: Διακοινοβουλευτική Συνέλευση Ορθοδοξίας, Russian: Межпарламентская Ассамблея Православия), or I.A.O., is a transnational, inter-parliamentary institution that in 1994 was originally established as the European Interparliamentary Assembly on Orthodoxy (EIAO).

Based in Athens, Greece, the Interparliamentary Assembly on Orthodoxy constitutes a permanent communication structure between parliamentarians of member states aiming at unity in diversity of Orthodox Christians on the principles and values of Christianity and democracy.

== History ==
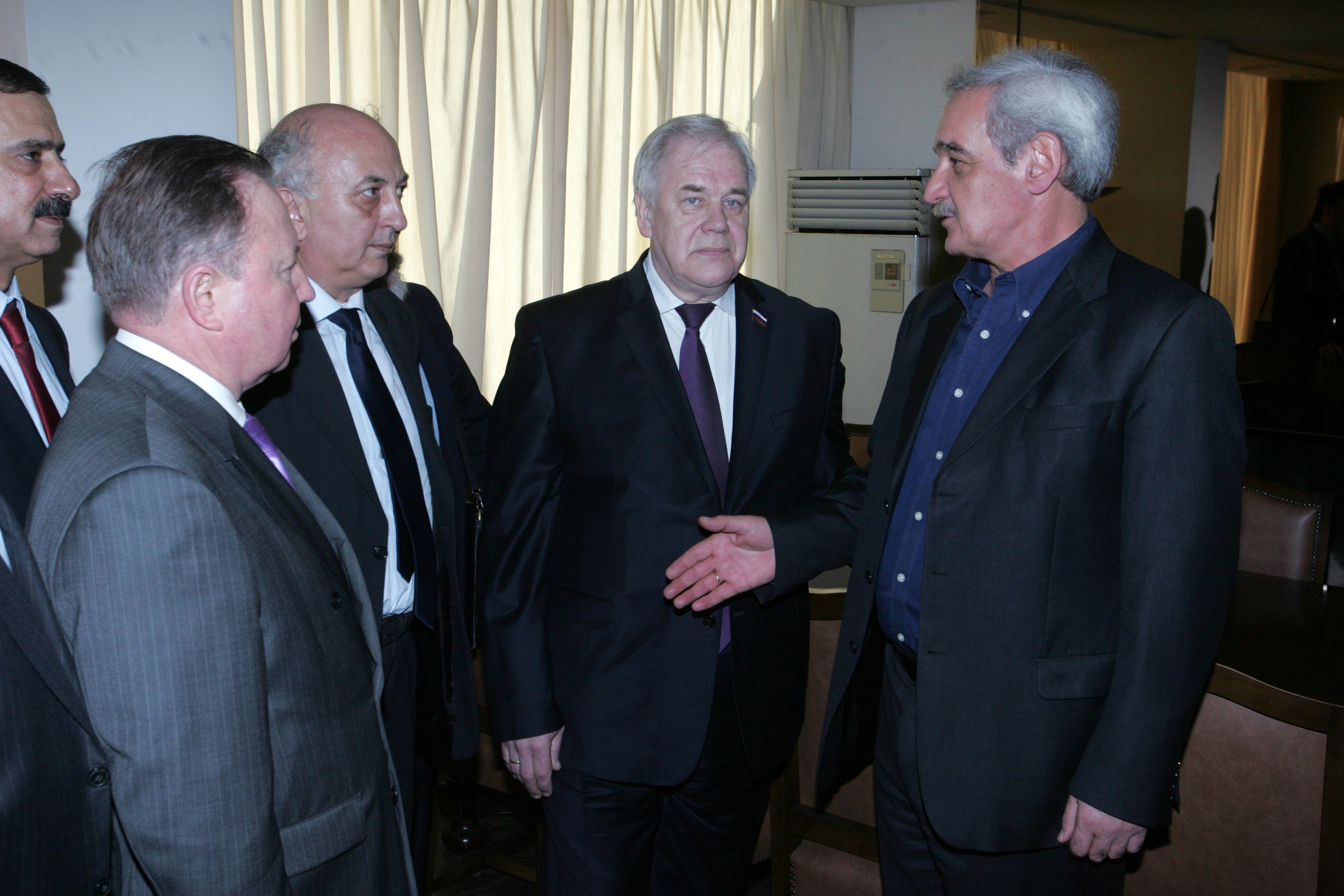
I.A.O. delegation headed by Sergei Popov (c.) meeting Greek Alternate Minister of European Affairs Nikos Hountis (r.)

Inspired by a conference held from 30 June to 4 July 1993 in Chalkidiki on the topic of "Orthodoxy in the New European Reality", the European Interparliamentary Assembly on Orthodoxy was formed by the initiative of the Hellenic Parliament. Following the 1993 Manifesto of the Participants, the official Founding Act was passed by the participants of the Founding Synod held in November 1994 in Athens. In 2001, groups of parliamentarians from Australia, Asia, Africa and the United States participated in the General Assembly, the organization was then renamed Interparliamentary Assembly on Orthodoxy (I.A.O.).

During the June 2004 General Assembly in Kyiv, Ukraine, it was decided to seek cooperation with the Parliamentary Union of the Organisation of Islamic Cooperation (P.U.I.C.). A co-operation agreement was drafted at a meeting of the two organizations on 22 March 2005, in Athens. On 19 May 2010, a cooperation agreement with the Pan-African Parliament was signed by PUIC's President Idriss Ndele Moussa and I.A.O.'s Secretary-General Anastasios Nerantzis

Massive protests broke out during the 2019 General Assembly in Tbilisi, Georgia, after the chairman of the assembly, a Russian communist named Sergei Gavrilov, made a number of public statements that were viewed by the Georgian public as denigrating Georgian sovereignty.

The delegation from Russia, as well as the delegations from Belarus and Syria, were unable to attend the 2023 General Assembly due to EU sanctions. The election of a Polish president ended the three decade long Russian control of the presidency.

== Institutional bodies ==
=== General Assembly ===
The supreme organ of the I.A.O. is the General Assembly, consisting of delegations from all member parliaments. The General Assembly convenes once annually during the month of June.

==== General Assembly timeline ====
No.	Country	City	Year	Main subject
1	Greece	Olympia	1993	Orthodoxy in the new European Reality
2	Greece	Athens	1994	European Countries and their mission in the new European reality
3	Russia	Moscow	1995	The Cultural and Enlightenment Tradition of Orthodoxy
4	Bulgaria	Sofia	1996	The Social Dimension of Orthodoxy
5	Greece	Chalkidiki	1997	Orthodoxy in the context of the European civilization- history and future
6	Poland	Warsaw	1998	The problems of the novel heresies (sects) in the E.I.A.O. countries and effective ways of dealing with them
7	Russia	Moscow	1999	Ways of legal protection of the traditional family as a diachronic value of society
8	Israel	Jerusalem	2000	The Son of Man in the year 2000 AD
9	Greece	Patmos	2001	The contribution of Orthodoxy in the enlarged European Union
10	Romania	Bucharest	2002	Globalisation and Orthodoxy
11	Lithuania	Vilnius	2003	Globalization and Orthodoxy
12	Ukraine	Kyiv	2004	Security with freedom
13	Switzerland	Geneva	2005	Christianism before the challenges of the modern era
14	Italy	Venice	2006	The contribution of the Orthodox culture to the construction of the New Europe
15	Kazakhstan	Astana	2007	The Inter-religious dialogue as a factor of peaceful and fair relationships among peoples
16	Greece	Rhodes	2008	The crisis of the global value system as a challenge before Christian Orthodoxy
17	Serbia	Belgrade	2009	The Global Economic Crisis and its impact on Social – Spiritual – Cultural European tradition
18	Armenia	Yerevan	2010	The contribution of Orthodoxy in the dynamics and development of statehood of the countries of Eastern Christian tradition
19	France	Paris	2011	Religious values in the Economic crisis reality
20	Czech Republic	Prague	2012	Challenges for democracy during periods of global economic crisis
21	Greece	Athens	2013	Parliamentary Democracy – Christianity – Orthodoxy: values and concepts
22	Russia	Moscow	2014	Orthodoxy: values and concepts
23	Austria	Vienna	2015	Orthodox Historic Communities in Europe and around the world
24	Greece	Thessaloniki	2016	Fundamental global changes – Christian Orthodox perspective
25	Italy	Rome	2017	The Christian understanding of global crisis and ways to overcome it
26	Greece	Athens	2018	25 years of the Interparliamentary Assembly on Orthodoxy
27	Georgia	Tbilisi	2019	The contribution of Parliamentarism in understanding modern Political – Social Phenomena
28	Virtual meeting due to the COVID-19 pandemic		2020	Elections of the I.A.O organs and the agenda of the future I.A.O. activities. 85 Members of Parliaments, official representatives of Parliaments, parliamentary groups and individual Parliamentary representatives participated in the General Assembly.
29	Greece	Crete	2021	The World's Future and the Future of Europe after the pandemic
30	Greece	Chalkidiki	2023	30 years of I.A.O.: Facing new challenges. Before new perspectives
31	Italy	Palermo	2024	Evaluation of the conclusions of the International Political Conference on Christian Values
32	Romania	Bucharest	2025	The cooperation of parliamentary and religious institutions in shaping the guidelines for the use of artificial intelligence: the significance of IPU’s Marrakesh Communiqué
33	Finland	Helsinki	2026	The Situation of Christian Minorities in Times of Crisis: Relations Between Society, the State, and the Church – Difficulties and Challenges

==== Presidents of the General Assembly ====
The President of the General Assembly is elected for a two-year tenure by the plenary session of the Assembly.

- 2023–present: Eugeniusz Czykwin (Poland)

=== International Secretariat ===
The International Secretariat appoints eight standing committees. It is headed by the Secretary-General, the Alternate Secretary and the Treasurer, and consists of an additional six members from various countries. As of 2020, the leadership consists of:

- Secretary-General: Maximos Charakopoulos (Greece)
- Alternate Secretary: Andreas Michailidis (Greece)
- Treasurer: Stavros Kalafatis (Greece)

International Secretariat representatives:

- Alexandr Cotric (Serbia)
- Theodore Ssekikubo (Uganda)
- Eugeniusz Czykwin (Poland)
- Dmitry Sablin (Russia)
- Angelos Votsis (Cyprus)
- Hany Naguib (Egypt)

==== Committees of the International Secretariat ====
As of 2020, the following committees are led by:

- Committee on Human Rights: Vangjel Dule (Albania)
- Committee on Mass Media: Milen Mihov (Bulgaria)
- Committee on Social Activity, Family and Motherhood:Elie Ferzli (Lebanon)
- Committee on Education: Alen Simonyan (Armenia)
- Cooperation Committee with the Pan-African Parliament: Athanasios Davakis (Greece)
- Cooperation Committee with the Parliamentary Assembly of the Russian – Belarus Union: Gennadiy Davydko
- Cooperation Committee with the Parliamentary Union of the Organisation of Islamic Cooperation member-states: Joseph Iskander (Sudan)
- Cooperation Working Group with the International Catholic Legislators Network: Lefteris Christoforou (Cyprus)

== Member countries ==
The Assembly currently consists of parliamentary committees of 21 countries, mostly from Eastern Europe, including:

- Albania
- Armenia
- Belarus
- Bulgaria
- Cyprus
- Czech Republic
- Estonia
- Finland
- Georgia
- Greece
- Kazakhstan
- Latvia
- Lithuania
- Moldova
- Montenegro
- Poland
- Romania
- Russia
- Serbia
- Slovakia
- Ukraine

Additionally, delegations from Africa, Asia, Australia, the European Union, and the United States have been participating in the Assembly.

== Cooperation agreements ==
The I.A.O. has signed several cooperation agreements with various international organizations, including:

- Parliamentary Union of the Organisation of Islamic Cooperation, since March 2005
- Parliamentary Assembly of the Union State, since November 2011
- Pan-African Parliament, since May 2011
- Interparliamentary Assembly of the Eurasian Economic Union, since November 2011
- Parliamentary Assembly of the Black Sea Economic Cooperation (PABSEC), observer status mutually granted
- Inter-Parliamentary Union, observer status mutually granted
- Parliamentary Assembly of the Mediterranean, Memorandum of Understanding since February 2019

The I.A.O has also participated in United Nations General Assembly conferences, has signed cooperation treaties with the parliaments of Egypt, Iran and Lebanon, as well as explored future cooperation with the Baltic Assembly, the European Parliament and the International Catholic Legislators Network: ICLN.

== See also ==
- Christianity in Europe
- Politics of Europe
- Religion in Europe
