= Panhumanism =

Ideology that advocates for unification of humankind

Panhumanism is the concept of an affiliation with all humankind through some sort of legislative structure that allows all technological and economic development to be for the benefit of all people. The concept is sometimes seen as far-left, although there are also right-wing and centrist pan-human organisations, including the United Nations, some of which have even received significant opposition from the far-left over globalisation policies.

== History ==
Humanism originates in the European Renaissance, especially the Italian Renaissance, although the word was not coined until the early nineteenth century. Rather than an ideology, it was a cultural frame of ideas with a non-absolutistic approach to any truth. It emphasized the uniqueness of the individual and often claimed a connection between man and nature.

At the core of Renaissance humanism was the concept of humanitas, which meant the development of human virtue to its fullest extent. The possessor of humanitas could not be merely a sedentary and isolated philosopher or man of letters but was of necessity a participant in active life. Just as action without insight was held to be aimless and barbaric, insight without action was rejected as barren and imperfect. Humanitas scholars also believed it was inevitable to project humanitas from the individual into the state at large.

== Interpretations ==
=== Carl Sagan ===
In our earliest history, so far as we can tell, individuals held to an allegiance toward their immediate tribal group, which may have numbered no more than ten or twenty individuals, all of whom were related by consanguinity. As time went on, the need for cooperative behaviour—in the hunting of large animals or large herds, in agriculture, and in the development of cities—forced human beings into larger and larger groups. The group that was identified with, the tribal unit, enlarged at each stage of evolution. Today, a particular instant in the 4.5-billion-year history of Earth and in the several-million-year history of mankind, most human beings owe their primary allegiance to the nation-state (although some of the most dangerous political problems still arise from tribal conflicts involving smaller population units). Many visionary leaders have imagined a time when the allegiance of an individual human being is not to his particular nation-state, religion, race, or economic group, but to mankind as a whole; when the benefit to a human being of another sex, race, religion, or political persuasion ten thousand miles away is as precious to us as to our neighbour or our brother. The trend is in this direction, but it is agonizingly slow. There is a serious question whether such a global self-identification of mankind can be achieved before we destroy ourselves with the technological forces our intelligence has unleashed.

— Carl Sagan,

=== Marxism ===
A communist society or communist system is the type of society and economic system postulated to emerge from technological advances in the productive forces in Marxist thought, representing the ultimate goal of the political ideology of Communism. A communist society is characterized by common ownership of the means of production with free access to the articles of consumption and is classless and stateless, implying the end of the exploitation of labor. In his Critique of the Gotha Programme Karl Marx referred to this stage of development as upper-stage communism.

=== World government ===
World government is the notion of a common political authority for all of humanity, yielding a global government and a single state. Such a government could come into existence either through violent and compulsory world domination or through peaceful and voluntary supranational union. Currently there is no worldwide executive, legislature, judiciary, military, or constitution with jurisdiction over the entire planet. The United Nations is limited to a mostly advisory role, and its stated purpose is to foster cooperation between existing national governments rather than exert authority over them.

A United Nations Parliamentary Assembly (UNPA) is a proposed addition to the United Nations System that would allow for participation of member nations' legislators and, eventually, direct election of United Nations (UN) parliament members by citizens worldwide. The idea was raised at the founding of the League of Nations in the 1920s and again following the end of World War II in 1945, but remained dormant throughout the Cold War. In the 1990s and 2000s, the rise of global trade and the power of world organizations that govern it led to calls for a parliamentary assembly to scrutinize their activity. The Campaign for the Establishment of a United Nations Parliamentary Assembly was formed in 2007 to coordinate pro-UNPA efforts, which as of July 2013 has received the support of over 850 Members of Parliament from over 90 countries worldwide, in addition to over 350 non-governmental organizations and 21 Nobel and Right Livelihood laureates and 16 Heads or former heads of state or government and foreign ministers.

== See also ==
- Globalization – The desire to interconnect and share ideas between cultures and nations
- Transhumanism – The idea of developing human capabilities as a species
- Stateless communism – A communist realisation of a pan-human state
- Postnationalism – The idea of devolving powers to supranational entities
- Global citizenship – The belief that one is a member of Earth, rather than of a nation or other entity
