= Asian Parliamentary Assembly =

Parliamentary assembly

- Logo

History
- Founded: 2006

Leadership
- President: Mustafa Şentop
- Secretary General: Mohammad Reza Majidi

Meeting place
- Tehran, Iran

Website
- www.asianparliament.org

The Asian Parliamentary Assembly (APA) aims to promote peace in general, and in the Asian region in particular. It was established as the Association of Asian Parliaments for Peace (AAPP) in September 1999 by Sheikh Hasina, acquiring its current name in 2006 during the Seventh Session of the AAPP.

== Overview ==
The APA consisted, as of 2007, of 41 Member Parliaments and 17 observers. Each Member Parliament has a specific number of seats in the Assembly based on the size of their population. The number of total seats, and therefore, number of votes, is currently 206. Members of Assembly must be elected by members of the Member Parliaments. The APA Charter and Tehran Declaration lay out a framework of cooperation among Asian countries, and point out to a vision; that is Asian Integration.

The APA differed from its predecessor through a focus on broadening areas of cooperation toward regional integration with the long term perspective to eventually reach the status of an Asian common legislative mechanism. Unlike the AAPP, members of the APA Plenary must be elected by members of member parliaments.

A 2017 standing committee meeting was held in Bhutan. The 10th plenary session, in November 2017 in Istanbul, was on the topic of "Sustaining Peace and Development in Asia".

== Membership ==
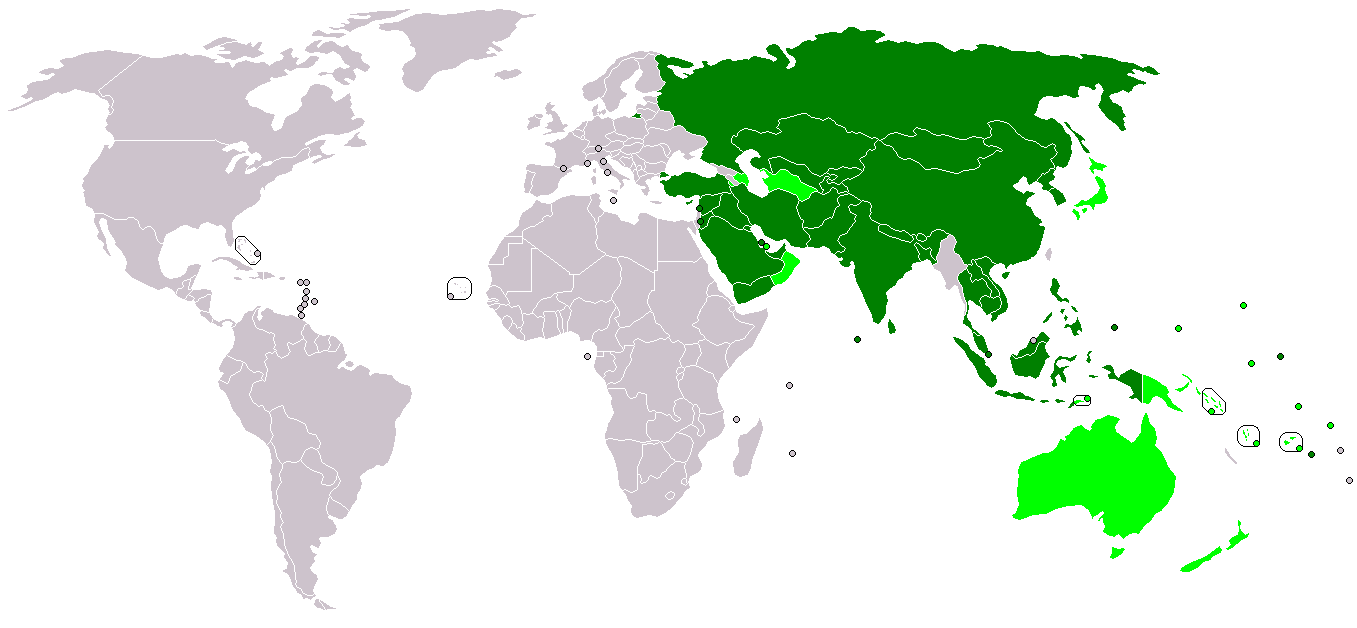
member states observer states

As of 2023, it consisted of 43 Member Parliaments and 30 observers.

=== Members and their votes in APA ===
- Afghanistan (4) House of Elders and House of the People
- Azerbaijan (4) National Assembly
- Bahrain (2) Council of Representatives and Shura Council
- Bangladesh (5) Parliament
- Bhutan (2) National Council and National Assembly
- Cambodia (4) Senate and National Assembly
- China (7) National People's Congress
- Cyprus (2) House of Representatives
- North Korea (4) Supreme People's Assembly
- India (7) Council of States and House of the People
- Indonesia (6) House of Representatives
- Iran (5) Islamic Consultative Assembly
- Iraq (4) Council of Representatives
- Jordan (4) Senate and House of Representatives
- Kazakhstan (4) Senate and House of Representatives
- Kiribati (2) House of Assembly
- Kuwait (4) National Assembly
- Kyrgyzstan (4) Supreme Council
- Laos (4) National Assembly
- Lebanon (4) National Assembly
- Malaysia (4) Senate and House of Representatives
- Maldives (2) People's Majlis
- Mongolia (4) State Great Hural
- Nepal (4) National Assembly and House of Representative
- Pakistan (6) Senate and National Assembly
- Palau (2) Senate and House of Delegates
- Palestine (4) Legislative Council and National Council
- Philippines (5) Senate and House of Representatives
- Qatar (4) Majlis Al-Shura
- Republic of Korea (4) National Assembly
- Russia (5) Council of the Federation and State Duma
- Saudi Arabia (4) Consultative Council
- Sri Lanka (4) Parliament
- Syria (4) People's Assembly
- Tajikistan (4) National Assembly and House of Representatives
- Thailand (5) Senate and House of Representatives
- Timor-Leste (4) National Parliament
- Tonga (2) Legislative Assembly
- Turkey (5) Grand National Assembly
- United Arab Emirates (4) Federal National Council
- Uzbekistan (4) Senate and Legislative Chamber
- Vietnam (5) National Assembly
- Yemen (4) Consultative Council and House of Representatives

=== Observers ===
- Australia Senate and House of Representatives
- Federated States of Micronesia Congress
- Fiji Parliament
- Japan House of Councillors and House of Representatives
- Marshall Islands Parliament
- Nauru Parliament
- New Zealand House of Representatives
- Oman Consultative Council and State Council
- Papua New Guinea National Parliament
- Samoa Legislative Assembly
- Solomon Islands National Parliament
- Turkmenistan Assembly and People's Council
- Tuvalu Parliament
- Vanuatu Parliament
- Arab IPU
- Arab Parliament
- AIPA
- ASEAN
- Council of Europe
- ICAPP
- Inter Parliamentary Assembly of the Eurasian Economic Community
- IPC
- Interparliamentary Assembly of Member Nations of the Commonwealth of Independent States
- Inter-Parliamentary Union
- Non-Aligned Movement Parliamentary Network
- Parliamentary Assembly of the Council of Europe
- Parliamentary Assembly of the Mediterranean
- TURKPA
- PUIC
- The League of Parliamentarians for Al Quds

== APA general Sessions ==
Date	Country	Location
September 1999	Bangladesh	Dhaka
5 - 10 November 2000	Cambodia	Phnom Penh
16-19 April 2002	China	Beijing and Chongqing
31 August - 4 September 2003	Philippines	Manila
29 November - 3 December 2004	Pakistan	Islamabad
2005	Thailand	Pattaya
12 - 14 November 2006	Iran	Tehran

== See also ==
- Asia Cooperation Dialogue
- Asian Development Bank
