= Assemblée parlementaire de la Francophonie =

International association of French-speaking parliaments

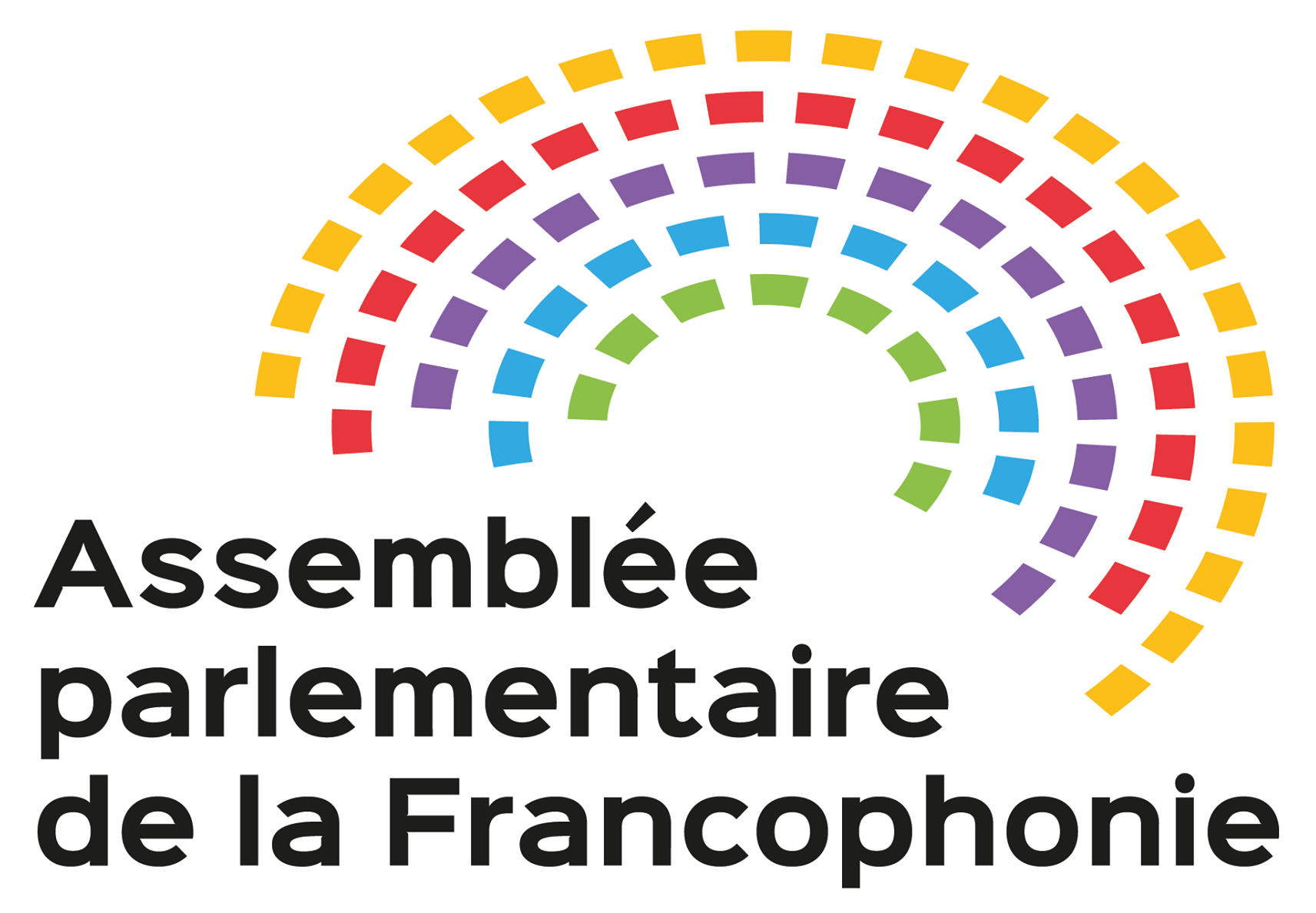
- Emblem
- Abbreviation: APF
- Formation: 1967
- Type: Inter-parliamentary institution
- Location: Paris, France
- Parent organization: Organisation internationale de la Francophonie
- Website: apf-francophonie.org

The Assemblée parlementaire de la Francophonie (APF) is an association of the parliaments of Francophone countries.

== History ==
It was established in Luxembourg in 1967, and was then known as the Association internationale des parlementaires de langue française. The assembly is a participating member of the Inter-Parliamentary Union.
