= Franco-German Parliamentary Assembly =

Inter-parliamentary institution of France and Germany

- French: Assemblée parlementaire franco-allemande; German: Deutsch-Französische Parlamentarische Versammlung
- Formation: 25 March 2019; 7 years ago
- Type: Inter-parliamentary institution
- Headquarters: Paris, France; Berlin, Germany
- Members: 100 members of parliament
- Official languages: French, German
- Chairpersons: Yaël Braun-Pivet; Bärbel Bas

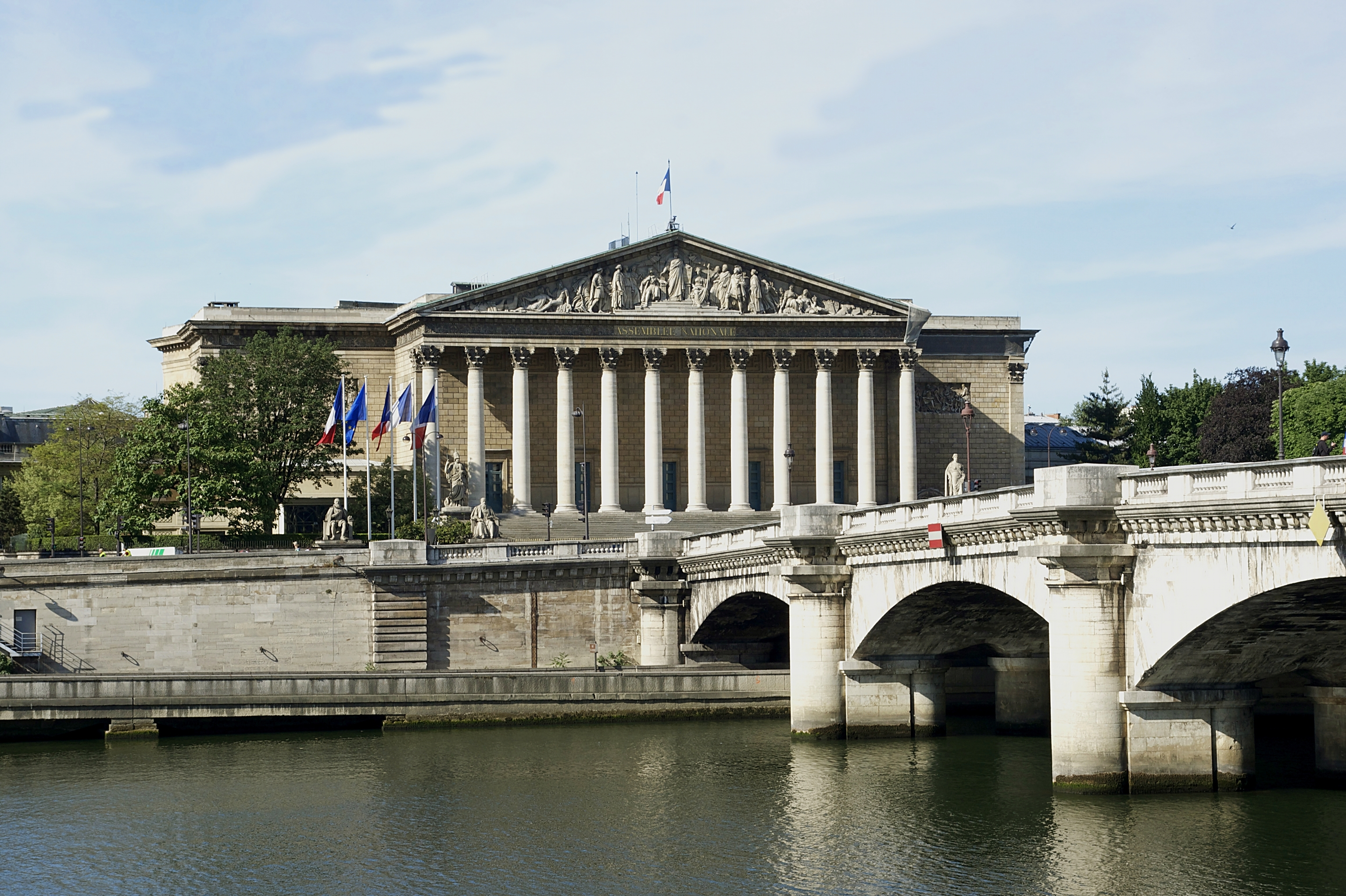
Palais Bourbon, Paris

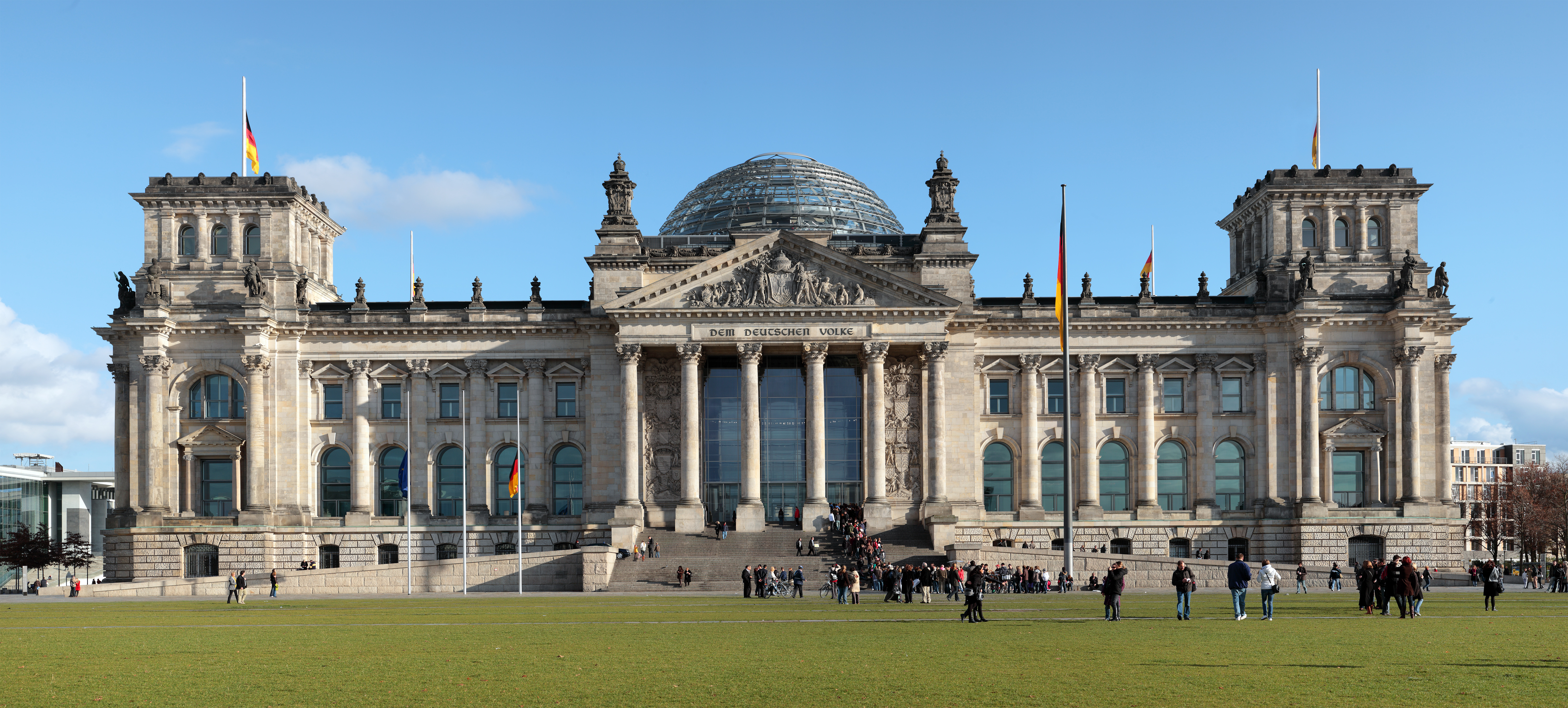
Reichstag building, Berlin

Meeting places of both parliaments

The Franco-German Parliamentary Assembly (French: Assemblée parlementaire franco-allemande, APFA; German: Deutsch-Französische Parlamentarische Versammlung, DFPV) is a joint body of the German Bundestag and the French National Assembly formed to enable cooperation between both houses.

== Background ==
The French and German parliaments had previously held a joint session on occasion of the 40th anniversary of the Élysée Treaty, a key document for France–Germany relations after World War II, in January 2003.

First steps for an inter-parliamentary organisation were laid with regular meetings of parliament committees during 2018. This led to the Aachen Treaty, signed by Angela Merkel and Emmanuel Macron on 22 January 2019. Subsequent talks between Bundestag and Assemblée nationale representatives ultimately resulted in an inter-parliamentary agreement to create a new parliamentary assembly, which was approved separately by both legislatures.

The assembly's first session was held on 25 March 2019 in Paris after the agreement was signed by Wolfgang Schäuble and Richard Ferrand, each parliament's president.

== Purpose ==
The parliamentary assembly does not have the capacity to make binding resolutions or legislation, nor any budgetary authority. Its goal is to discuss matters of French-German cooperation, such as the ratification of the Aachen Treaty, cross-border development projects, and the implementation of EU Directives. Other topics for discussion include foreign, defence and security policy.

Sessions are held twice per year, alternating between Paris and Berlin.

== Membership ==
The joint assembly is composed of 100 members, 50 sent by each parliament. The President of the Bundestag and President of the National Assembly are its chairpersons. An administrative bureau (French: bureau de l’Assemblée, German: Vorstand der Versammlung) led by Sabine Thillaye (France) and Andreas Jung (Germany) was formed.

== See also ==
- Franco-German Ministerial Council
