= ASEAN Inter-Parliamentary Assembly =

Parliamentary body in southeast Asia

- Logo of AIPA

Type
- Type: Inter-parliamentary institution

History
- Founded: 2 September 1977; 49 years ago
- Preceded by: ASEAN Inter-Parliamentary Organization

Leadership
- President: (Philippines) Bojie Dy since 23 September 2025
- Secretary General: (Cambodia) Chem Widhya since 1 January 2026

Structure
- Seats: 11 members: Brunei; Cambodia; Indonesia; Laos; Malaysia; Myanmar; Philippines; Singapore; Thailand; Timor-Leste; Vietnam
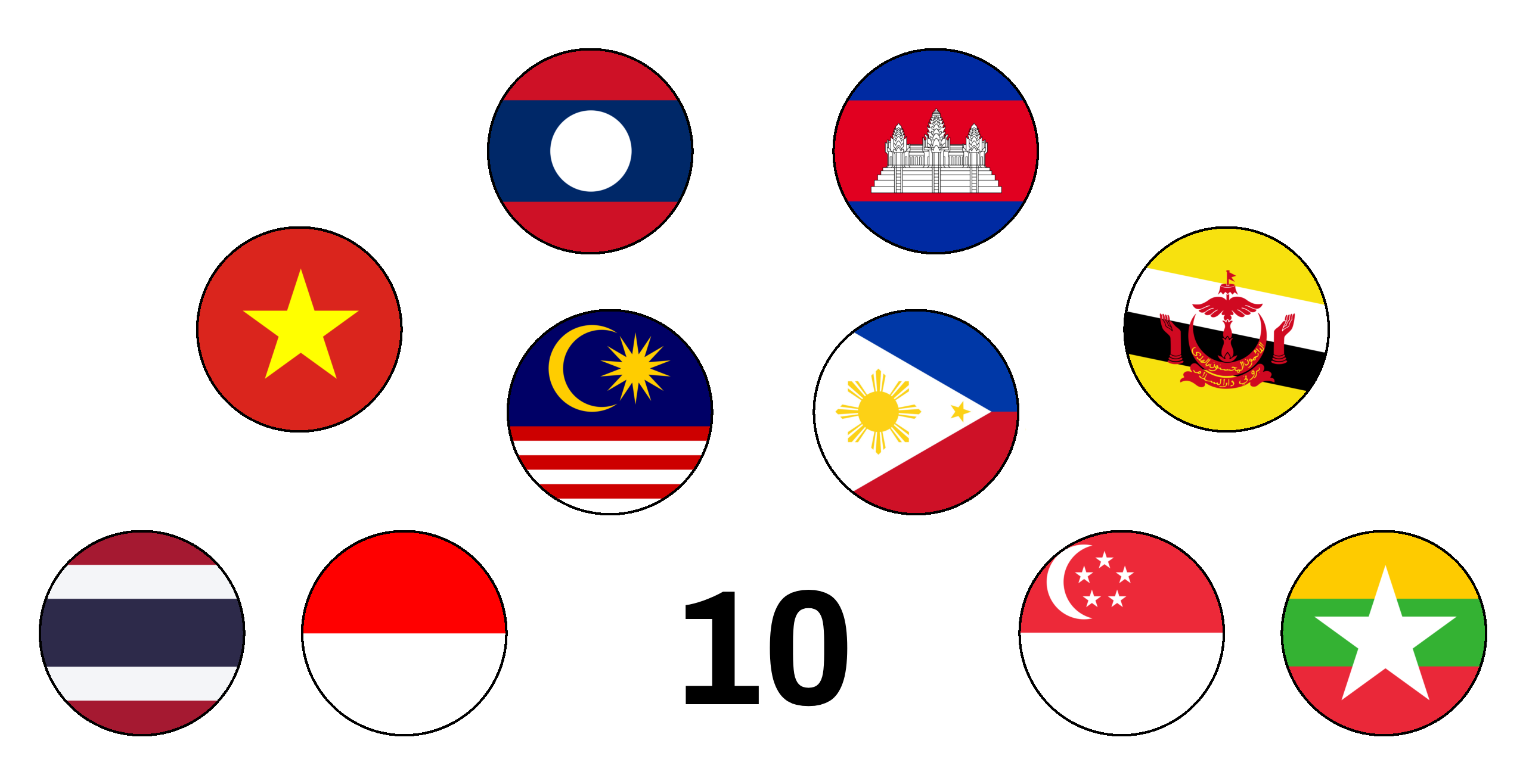
- Committees: 8 configurations: Standing Committees: Political Committee; Economic Committee; Social Committee; Organizational Committee; AIPA Women Parliamentarians Conference; Dialog Committee; Study and Ad-Hoc Committees: AIPA Advisory Council on Dangerous Drugs; AIPA Caucus

Motto
- One Vision, One Identity, One Community

Meeting place
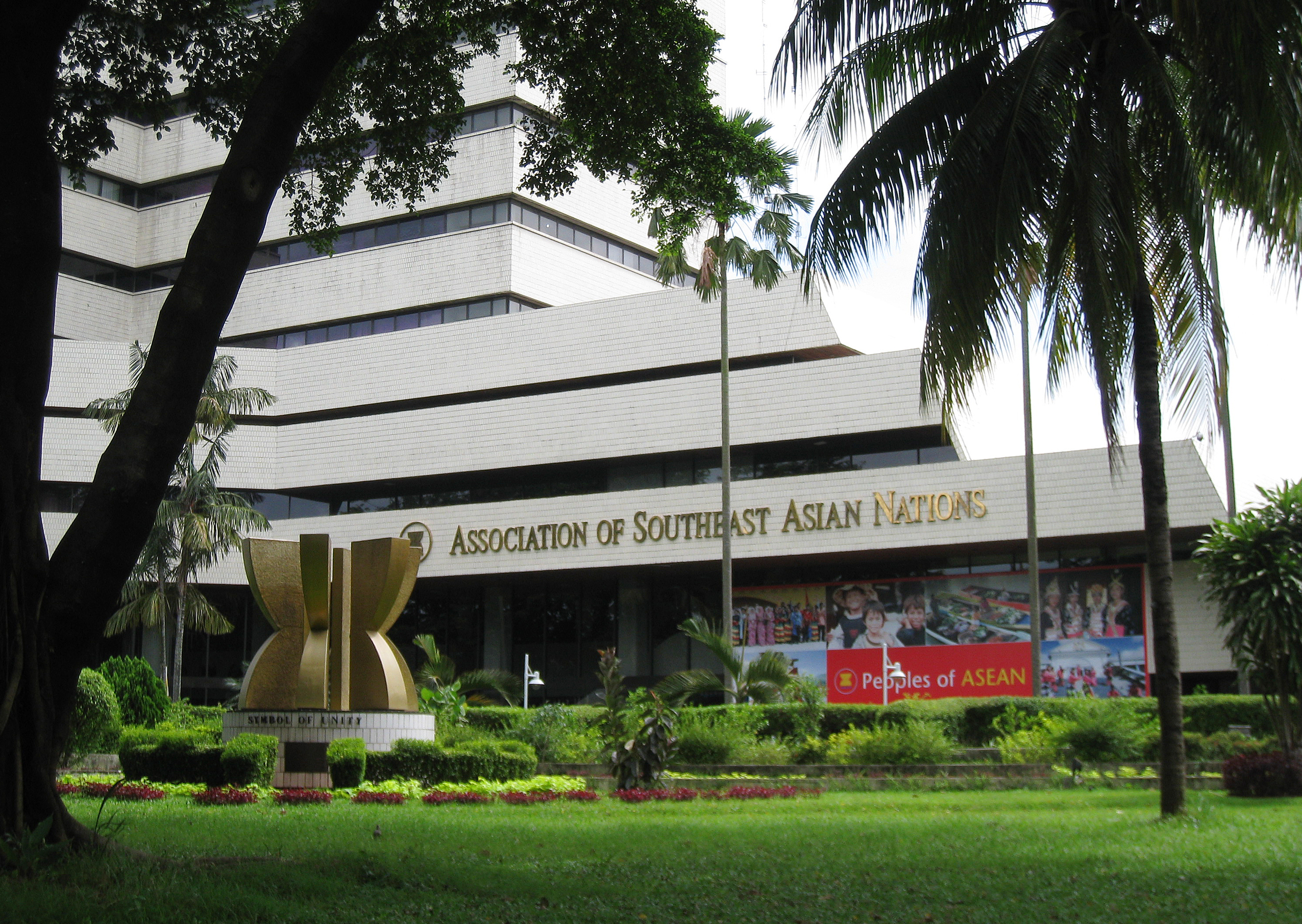
- ASEAN Secretariat Heritage Building; Jakarta, Indonesia

Website
- aipasecretariat.org

The ASEAN Inter-Parliamentary Assembly (AIPA) is a regional parliamentary body which acts as a primary point for communication and information sharing between member countries. Its primary objectives are to provide information to Southeast Asian citizens about policies aimed at establishing an ASEAN community by 2025 and to foster mutual understanding and collaboration among these parliaments.

Unlike the European Parliament, AIPA is a form of transnational parliamentary conference with weak constitutional power, holding only advisory power and lacking legislative and oversight powers over ASEAN itself and its members. Every year, ASEAN countries take turns holding the Presidency of the Assembly and taking on the responsibility of organizing the plenary meetings of the member parliaments in the General Assembly of the Association of Southeast Asian Nations (AIPA General Assembly).

== History ==
=== Establishment ===
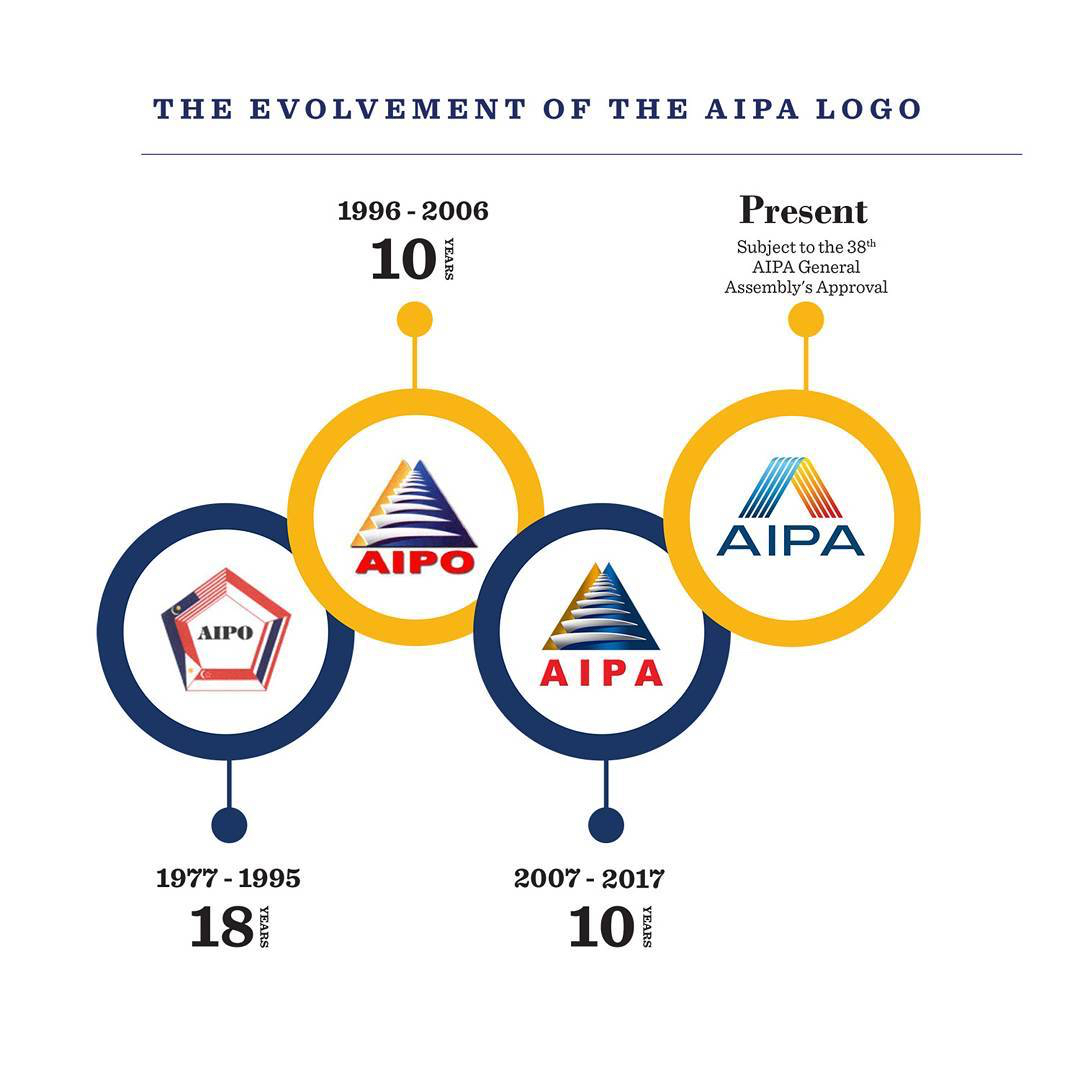
Timeline of the AIPA logo

In 1977, a decade after the founding of the Association of Southeast Asian Nations (ASEAN), the need to strengthen regional solidarity became increasingly apparent. Legislators recognized that the growth of ASEAN was closely tied to the cooperation between the parliaments of its member countries, which represent the will and aspirations of the people. This realization led to calls for closer inter-parliamentary collaboration to seek new sources of motivation for regional cooperation. Thus the organization's creation was initiated by Indonesia, with the support of other members of ASEAN's five founding-members. The heads of the parliamentary delegations from Indonesia, Malaysia, the Philippines, Singapore, and Thailand—who were attending the 3rd ASEAN Inter-Parliamentary Conference in Manila—originally created the ASEAN Inter-Parliamentary Organization (AIPO) on September 2, 1977, which is grouped with, but formally associated with ASEAN. AIPO was established to promote cooperation between member parliaments to achieve the goals and aspirations of ASEAN.

Met for the first time in 1978 in Singapore, AIPA today has over 300 members of parliamentarians and MPs that includes all ten members of ASEAN, namely the legislatures of Brunei, Cambodia, Indonesia, Laos, Malaysia, Myanmar, the Philippines, Singapore, Thailand and Vietnam. Brunei and Myanmar, which previously had no legislature, participated as special observers to AIPO. Then, in 1993, Brunei became a permanent observer. Later, Vietnam joined in 1995, Laos in 1997, Cambodia in 1999, Brunei in 2009, and Myanmar joined in 2011. In 2009, at the 30th AIPA General Assembly in Pattaya, Thailand, a resolution was considered and adopted to recognize the Legislative Council of Brunei as an official member of AIPA. Myanmar participated in AIPO activities as a special observer since 1997 and became a full member of AIPA at the 32nd AIPA General Assembly in Cambodia in September 2011 after the country promulgated a new constitution and held parliamentary elections. Since 1979, it has held semi-regular bilateral meetings with the European Parliament.

=== Reforms ===
On September 14, 2006, at the 27th General Assembly of the ASEAN Inter-Parliamentary Organization (AIPO) in Cebu, Philippines, all ten member countries agreed to change the organization's name to the Association of Southeast Asian Nations Inter-Parliamentary Assembly (AIPA). The adoption of the AIPA Charter on April 17, 2007, replacing the previous AIPO Charter, marked the completion of the transition. Then, Indonesia's parliament speaker, Agung Laksono, said that the transition from AIPO to AIPA was not simply a change of words, but had profound meaning, expressing the aspirations of ASEAN peoples for the bloc's parliamentary organization to operate more effectively, towards a model of effective inter-parliamentary cooperation and closer cooperation between ASEAN parliaments.

== Powers and functions ==
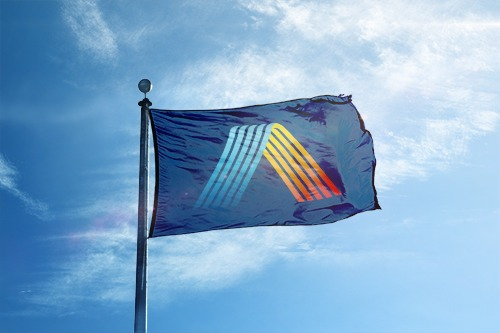
Flag of AIPA

The ASEAN Inter-Parliamentary Assembly (AIPA) is a form of transnational parliamentary conference with minimal legal status. Regarding the internal affairs of the parliaments of ASEAN member countries, the council only has advisory rights and lacks legislative and supervisory powers. Along with the renaming of the organization in 2006, AIPA also reformed its organizational structure such as: President, Executive Committee, Standing Committee, as well as strengthening the role of the AIPA Secretary General.

=== General Assembly of the ASEAN Inter-Parliamentary Assembly ===
The General Assembly of the ASEAN Inter-Parliamentary Assembly (AIPA) is the highest body of AIPA, the policy-making body of AIPA and meets at least once a year, unless otherwise decided by the Executive Board. The AIPA General Assembly consists of delegations from each member parliament, with each delegation comprising 15 members of parliament amounting to 150 MPs for each General Assembly meetings. Each may invite additional special-observers, observers, and guests. The AIPA General Assembly sessions are hosted by the parliaments of member countries, which rotate each year in the position of AIPA President of that country.

The president of the parliament of the country hosting the AIPA General Assembly will be the President of AIPA, as well as the President of that General Assembly. Normally, the term of office of the AIPA President is one year, equivalent to the time between two General Assembly sessions, and of course, it is also held by member countries in rotation. The AIPA President is responsible for promoting the goals and principles of AIPA, cooperating with the parliaments of member countries to strengthen parliamentary institutions and the role of parliamentarians in regional issues. The AIPA President is also the Chairman of the Executive Committee and has the power to convene the Executive Committee Meeting at the time and place required. The AIPA President, when invited, will attend each ASEAN Summit and has the power to invite the Chairman of the ASEAN Standing Committee to attend the AIPA General Assembly and other meetings of the Council.

==== Executive Committee ====
The Executive Committee is the advisory body of AIPA, consisting of no more than three parliamentarians from each member parliament. The term of the Executive Committee follows the term of each General Assembly session. The Executive Committee has the following tasks: to consider and introduce official members, special-observers and other observers; to propose new initiatives on activities; to organize the implementation of resolutions; to consider and decide on the agenda of the General Assembly sessions; to propose the establishment of Standing Committees, Research Committees and Special Committees; to direct, manage and supervise the work of the Permanent Secretariat; to propose the appointment of personnel of the Permanent Secretariat and to promulgate the operating regulations of the Executive Committee.

==== Standing committees ====
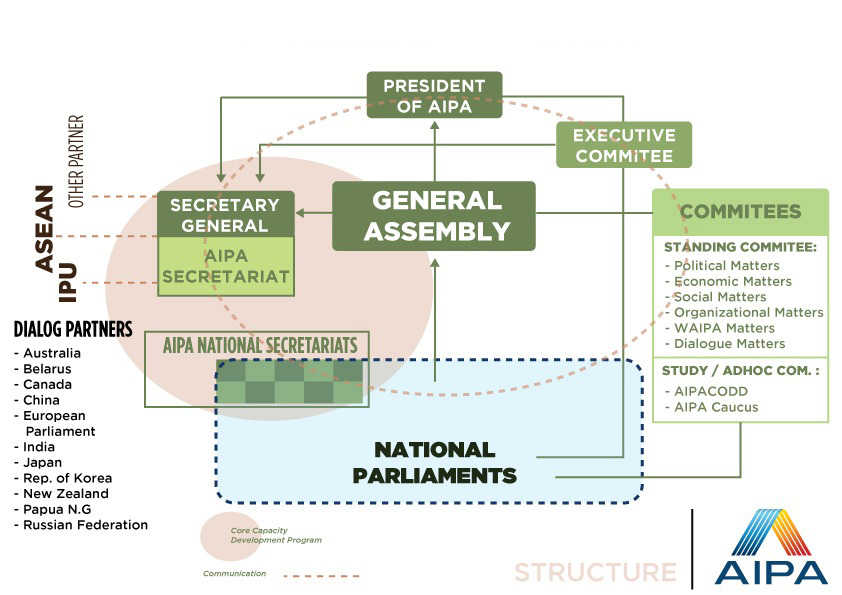
AIPA structure and organization

The General Assembly may establish Standing Committees, Study Committees and Ad-Hoc Committees or sub-committees of a Standing Committee on specific matters. Currently, the Assembly has the following Standing Committees:

- Political Committee
- Economic Committee
- Social Committee
- Organizing Committee
- AIPA Women Parliamentarians Conference (WAIPA)
- Committee dialogue with observers

There are also two Study Committee and Ad-Hoc Committee:

- AIPA Advisory Council on Dangerous Drugs (AIPACODD)
- AIPA Caucus

=== Secretariat and Secretary General ===
The Secretariat is the administrative organ of AIPA. The functions and tasks of the AIPA Secretariat are defined as the administrative office and information center for the work and activities of AIPA—the coordinating body and the channel of communication between AIPA and ASEAN—as well as with other regional and international organizations. The headquarters of the AIPA Secretariat is located in the same city as the headquarters of the ASEAN Secretariat, currently Jakarta. The Secretary General of the ASEAN Inter-Parliamentary Assembly is the head of the AIPA Secretariat, responsible for the operations of the secretariat and is elected for a term of three years.

== Parliamentary sessions ==
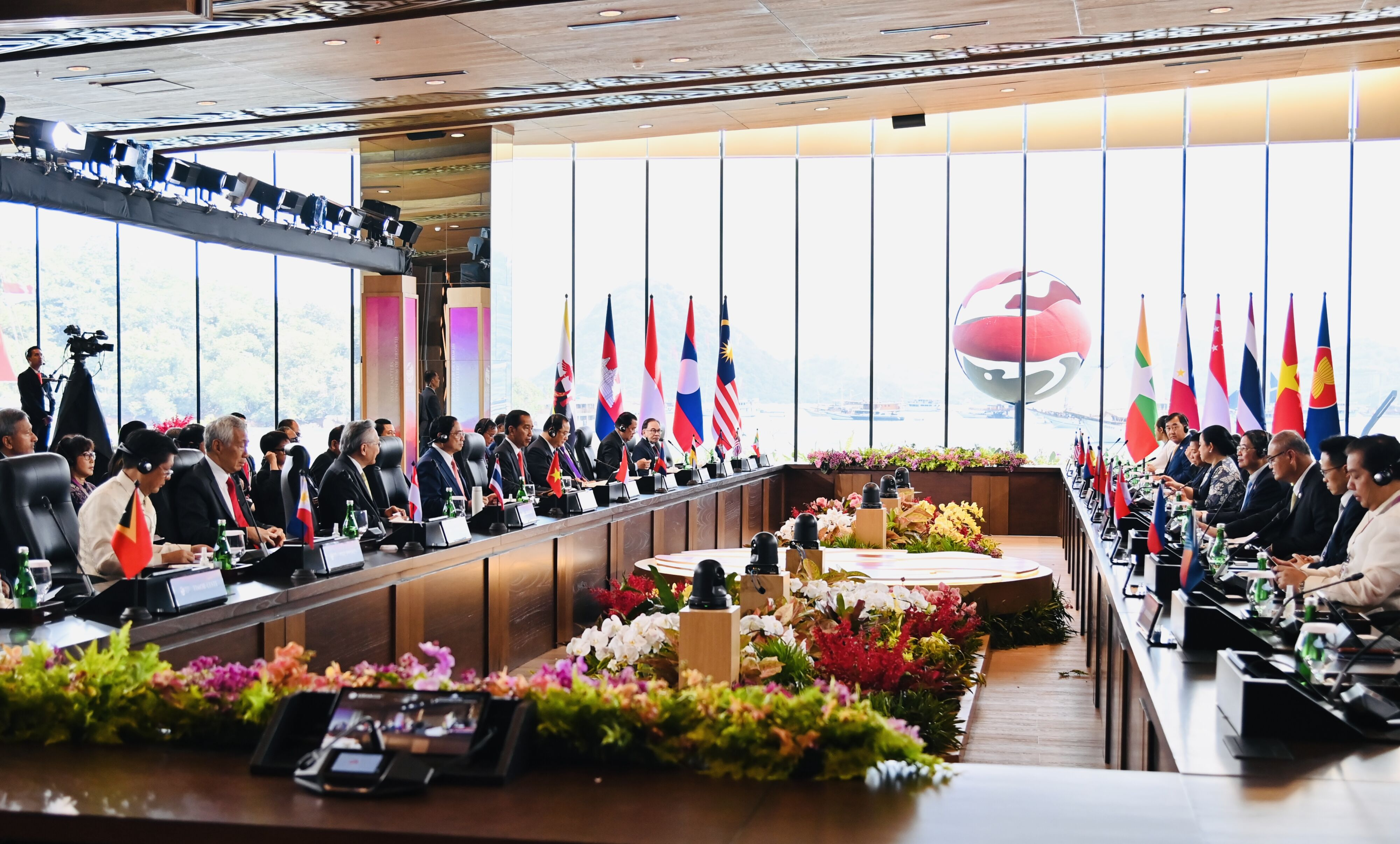
Leaders and parliamentary speakers of ASEAN at the 2023 AIPA–ASEAN Summit in Labuan Bajo, Indonesia.

According to the Charter of AIPO (and now the AIPA), the General Assembly of the ASEAN Inter-Parliamentary Assembly (AIPA) will meet once a year, hosted by the parliament of a member country in its country, on a rotational basis. As of 2017, there have been 38 AIPA General Assemblies. At each General Assembly, AIPA meets with dialogue partners such as Australia, Canada, China, Japan, South Korea, New Zealand, Papua New Guinea, Russia, India and the European Parliament. The first AIPO General Assembly in 1978 was held in Singapore.

During the 27th AIPO General Assembly held in Cebu, Philippines on September 14, 2006, at the closing session, the organization changed its name to the Association of Southeast Asian Nations Inter-Parliamentary Assembly (AIPA). In addition, AIPO-27 added new regulations such as AIPO having a professional Secretary General following the ASEAN model with a three-year term, the Executive Committee and specialized committees such as the Women's Committee, the Economic Committee, the Political Committee, the Social Committee, and the Organization Committee were enhanced in their roles and powers. For resolutions issued by AIPO, national parliaments are required to disseminate them to their parliaments and governments, and at the same time, member parliaments are responsible for reporting to AIPO on how AIPO resolutions have been and are being implemented. The AIPO President and the ASEAN Standing Committee President will attend each other's major activities.

In 2020, when the National Assembly of Vietnam was the President of AIPA, due to the impact of the COVID-19 pandemic, the Inter-Parliamentary Assembly was held online for the first time. At the 41st AIPA General Assembly, the parliaments of the countries developed a strategic vision for AIPA for the next five to ten years. At the same time, the 41st AIPA General Assembly also re-organized the meeting of the Political Committee of the Assembly after three consecutive general assemblies could not be held.

The most recent AIPA General Assembly was the 42nd ASEAN Inter-Parliamentary Assembly (AIPA-42) held in 2021, which was also held online, chaired by the President of the Legislative Council of Brunei, due to the continuing Covid-19 pandemic.

== Members and observers ==
=== Members ===
- Indonesia — People's Representative Council of Indonesia (September 2, 1977): founding member of AIPO.
- Malaysia — Parliament of Malaysia (September 2, 1977): founding member of AIPO.
- Philippines — Congress of the Philippines (September 2, 1977): founding member of AIPO.
- Singapore — Parliament of Singapore (September 2, 1977): founding member of AIPO.
- Thailand — National Assembly of Thailand (September 2, 1977): founding member of AIPO.
- Vietnam — National Assembly of Vietnam (September 19, 1995).
- Laos — National Assembly of Laos (1997).
- Cambodia — National Assembly of Cambodia (1999).
- Brunei — Legislative Council of Brunei (September 4, 2009).
- Myanmar — Union Assembly of Myanmar (September 20, 2011).
- Timor-Leste — National Parliament of Timor-Leste (November 18, 2026).

=== Observers ===
As of 2023, the ASEAN Inter-Parliamentary Council has 23 observer members, one of them being the European Parliament—a synonymous model regional parliament. The other 22 observers are national parliaments or lower chambers of governments. Most recently, the Ukrainian Parliament and the lower house of Pakistan were admitted during the 42nd AIPA General Assembly 2021 in Brunei. Followed by the Armenian National Assembly which was granted observer status at the 44th AIPA General Assembly in Jakarta in August 2023.

August 2023 marked the ASEAN Inter-Parliamentary Assembly's 44th General Session in Jakarta, which concluded with key document approvals and a handover of AIPA chairmanship. The session was joined by the Belarusian Deputy Chairman of the House of Representatives.

On September 16, 2024, the Serbian parliament formally requested an associate membership in the ASEAN Inter-Parliamentary Assembly (AIPA), citing historical cooperation in the Non-Aligned Movement.

On September 20, 2025, during the 46th AIPA General Assembly under Malaysian chairmanship, the Parliament of Algeria was granted observer status.
