= Parliamentary Assembly of the Mediterranean =

International organization of Euro-Mediterranean and Gulf region parliaments

- Abbreviation: PAM
- Formation: 2005
- Type: International organization
- Headquarters: San Marino
- Location: Mediterranean region
- Members: 32 member states: Albania; Algeria; Andorra; Bahrain; Bosnia-Herzegovina; Croatia; Cyprus; Egypt; France; Greece; Israel; Italy; Jordan; Lebanon; Libya; Malta; Mauritania; Monaco; Montenegro; Morocco; North Macedonia; Palestine; Portugal; Qatar; Romania; San Marino; Serbia; Slovenia; Syria; Tunisia; Turkey; United Arab Emirates; 3 associate members: Holy See; Order of Malta; Saudi Arabia; 2 observer states: Armenia; Azerbaijan; 11 partner states: Bulgaria; Georgia; Kazakhstan; Kuwait; Moldova; Oman; Slovakia; Switzerland; Ukraine; United Kingdom; United States
- President: Hon. Giulio Centemero
- Website: www.pam.int

The Parliamentary Assembly of the Mediterranean (PAM) is an international organization established in 2005 by the national parliaments of the countries of the Euro-Mediterranean region. It is the legal successor of the Conference on Security and Cooperation in the Mediterranean (CSCM), launched in the early 1990s.

The PAM was originally headquartered in Malta, in recognition of Malta's strategic role and commitment in organizing the PAM. The current headquarters is located in the Republic of San Marino. PAM also has offices in Naples, Italy.

PAM also has Permanent Observers to the UN in Geneva, New York and Vienna, a Liaison Officer with UNSCO and UNIFIL in Jerusalem, and a Permanent Representation to LAS in Cairo.

== Objectives ==
The main objective of PAM is to forge political, economic and social cooperation among the Member States in order to find common solutions to the challenges facing the Euro-Mediterranean and Gulf region, and to create a space for peace and prosperity for its peoples.

PAM is a centre for regional parliamentary diplomacy, whose members from Euro-Mediterranean and Gulf countries are represented on equal footing. This is reflected in the composition of the Bureau and the alternating Presidency. The current President of PAM is Enaam Mayara. Each national delegation has up to five members with equal voting rights and decision-making powers.

PAM conducts the bulk of its work within three Standing Committees. It convenes annually in a Plenary Session. It may also set up Working Groups, ad-hoc Committees or Special Task Forces to tackle a particular topic (i.e. Counter-Terrorism, Confidence Building, Peace Support, Conflict Resolution, Middle East Peace Process, Mass Migration, Free Trade and Investments, Economic Integration, Climate Change, Energy, Human Rights, Dialogue of Civilizations, Gender issues, etc…). The main operational and coordination instruments of PAM in these fields are Field Missions, Electoral Observation Teams, the Economic Panel on Trade and Investments, the Academic Platform and the Women Parliamentary Forum.

Although the reports and resolutions adopted by PAM are not legally binding, they function as a “soft diplomacy” tool when dealing with parliaments, governments and civil society in the region.

== Secretariat ==
The international Secretariat, an autonomous and independent body of the Assembly, assists and advises the PAM President, the PAM Bureau and all members in the execution of their mandate and is responsible for the follow-up on the decisions taken by the Assembly providing coordination, assistance and support to the work of the Committees and all other bodies established under PAM.

The Secretariat interacts with national delegations, as well as with regional and international bodies sharing an interest in the PAM region. It has the mandate to stimulate the activities of the Assembly. It also coordinates the awarding of the PAM Prize dedicated to individuals or institutions whose work is considered of great value for the PAM region.

The Secretary General, assisted by international and local staff, coordinates the activities of the Assembly

The PAM Secretariat is also entrusted with the parliamentary dimension of the 5+5 Western Mediterranean Forum and the MEDCOP.

== Relations with non-Mediterranean countries and international institutions ==
The membership criteria and geographical location of its members position PAM as a central actor in the Mediterranean region.

The General Assembly of the United Nations granted observer status to the Parliamentary Assembly of the Mediterranean, by the Resolution A/RES/64/124, at its 64th Session on 16 December 2009.

In order to ensure coherence and coordination in decision processes, including social peace, the PAM encourages parliamentarians to participate in today’s regional debates, contributing to the elaboration of policies that bear both an immediate impact and a long-term impact for future generations. According to the PAM, today’s challenges, which include mass migration, climate change and most importantly the resurgence of conflicts and the evolution of terrorism, require a collective effort, goodwill and confidence-building measures.

The political dialogue established among members of PAM, in particular with respect to the Middle East issues, Syria and Libya crises, and the Russian aggression against Ukraine, are of crucial importance.

To further its objectives, PAM encourages the inter-governmental support of the main actors in the region as well as regional institutions.

== Membership ==
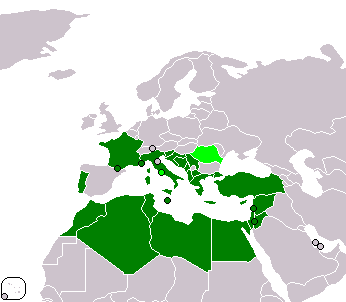
Member parliaments Associates and partners

As of February 2026, there are 31 member parliaments, 3 associate member states, 2 observer states, 59 partner states and organizations, and 13 observer organizations.

=== Member states ===
- Albania
- Algeria
- Andorra
- Bahrain
- Bosnia-Herzegovina
- Croatia
- Cyprus
- Egypt
- France
- Greece
- Israel
- Italy
- Jordan
- Lebanon
- Libya
- Malta
- Mauritania
- Monaco
- Montenegro
- Morocco
- North Macedonia
- Palestine
- Portugal
- Qatar
- Romania
- San Marino
- Serbia
- Slovenia
- Syria
- Tunisia
- Turkey
- United Arab Emirates

=== Associate members ===
- Holy See
- Order of Malta
- Saudi Arabia

=== Observer states ===
- Armenia
- Azerbaijan

=== Candidate members ===
- Hungary
- Russia (suspended)
- Spain

=== Partner states and organizations ===
- Bulgaria
- Georgia
- Kazakhstan
- Kuwait
- Moldova
- Oman
- Slovakia
- Switzerland
- Ukraine
- United Kingdom
- United States
- African Parliamentary Union
- Arab IPU
- Arab Parliament
- Asian Parliamentary Assembly
- Baltic Sea Parliamentary Conference
- Conseil Consultatif de l’UMA
- European Parliament
- IPA CIS
- Interparliamentary Assembly on Orthodoxy
- Inter-Parliamentary Union
- NATO-PA
- OSCE-PA
- PABSEC
- Parliamentary Assembly of the Council of Europe
- Parliamentary Assembly of the Francophonie Pan-African Parliament
- PA-UfM
- PUIC
- Parliamentary Network of the World Bank and IMF
- SEECP PA
- African Union
- CTBTO
- EBRD
- European Investment Bank
- EUROMED
- European Court of Human Rights
- European Union
- European Commission
- FEMISE
- Gulf Cooperation Council
- International Monetary Fund
- IRENA
- League of Arab States
- NATO
- North-South Centre of the Council of Europe
- Organization of the Islamic Cooperation
- OECD
- Union du Maghreb arabe
- UfM
- UN System
- UNEP
- FISPMED
- UNCTAD
- UNODC
- UNOCT
- World Bank
- WHO
- WTO
- Anna Lindh Foundation
- ASCAME, BUSINESS MED
- Euro-Mediterranean University (EMUNI)
- FIDU
- Mediterranean Citizens’ Assembly Foundation
- MEDREG
- MED-TSO
- Women Political Leaders

=== Observers ===
- Arab Inter-parliamentary Union
- Preparatory Commission for the Comprehensive Nuclear-Test-Ban Treaty Organization
- Euro-Mediterranean University of Slovenia
- Fondazione Mediterraneo
- Arab League
- Maghreb Consultative Council of the Arab Maghreb Union
- Mediterranean Citizens Assembly Foundation
- Mediterranean Energy Regulators (MEDREG)
- Parliamentary Assembly of the Union for the Mediterranean
- Parliamentary Assembly of the Organisation of the Black Sea Economic Cooperation
- Organization of Islamic Cooperation
- UNESCO
- World Meteorological Organisation

== Cooperation with other organizations ==
In addition to the above, PAM also cooperates (to various degrees) with other international organizations, including the:

- Arab Parliament
- Council of Europe
- European Bank for Reconstruction and Development
- European Investment Bank
- Interparliamentary Assembly on Orthodoxy
- Parliamentary Assembly of the Commonwealth of Independent States

== See also ==
- Parliamentary Assembly of the Union for the Mediterranean
