= Chem Widhya =

Cambodian ambassador

Chem Widhya has been the ambassador of the Kingdom of Cambodia (rank of a minister since September 2009) to Germany, Cyprus (2009), the Czech Republic, Malta (2008–2010), Poland, Slovenia, and then France (2016–2020).

== Education ==
Chem holds a Ph.D. degree in political science and a doctorate in political affairs from the Institute of International Relations in Potsdam, Germany.

== Career ==
Dr. Chem began his diplomatic career in 1990 with a two-year tenure as private secretary to Cambodian Prime Minister Hun Sen. He then became secretariat of Cambodia's Supreme National Council for two years, and then deputy secretary-general to Cambodia's Constituent Assembly. Since 1993 he has served as permanent secretary of Cambodia's Ministry of Foreign Affairs and International Cooperation. In 1996 he was appointed undersecretary of state, and then secretary of state in 1997.

In addition to his political appointments, Chem has also served on the board of directors of the Royal School of Administration since 1995, and on the board of directors of the Cambodia Development Resource Institute since 2000. In 2003 he was awarded the orders of Chevalier and Commandeur in the Royal Order of Mony Saraphoan. He was ambassador and permanent representative of Cambodia to the United Nations from 2004 to 2006. He was also non-resident ambassador of his country to Canada in from 2005 to 2006.

From 2007 to 2014, he was ambassador of Cambodia in the German Federal Republic. He was then ambassador of the Kingdom to the French Republic from 2016 to 2020.
