= CIS Interparliamentary Assembly =

Consultative parliamentary body

Interparliamentary Assembly of Member Nations of the Commonwealth of Independent States
- Межпарламентская Ассамблея государств — участников Содружества Независимых Государств

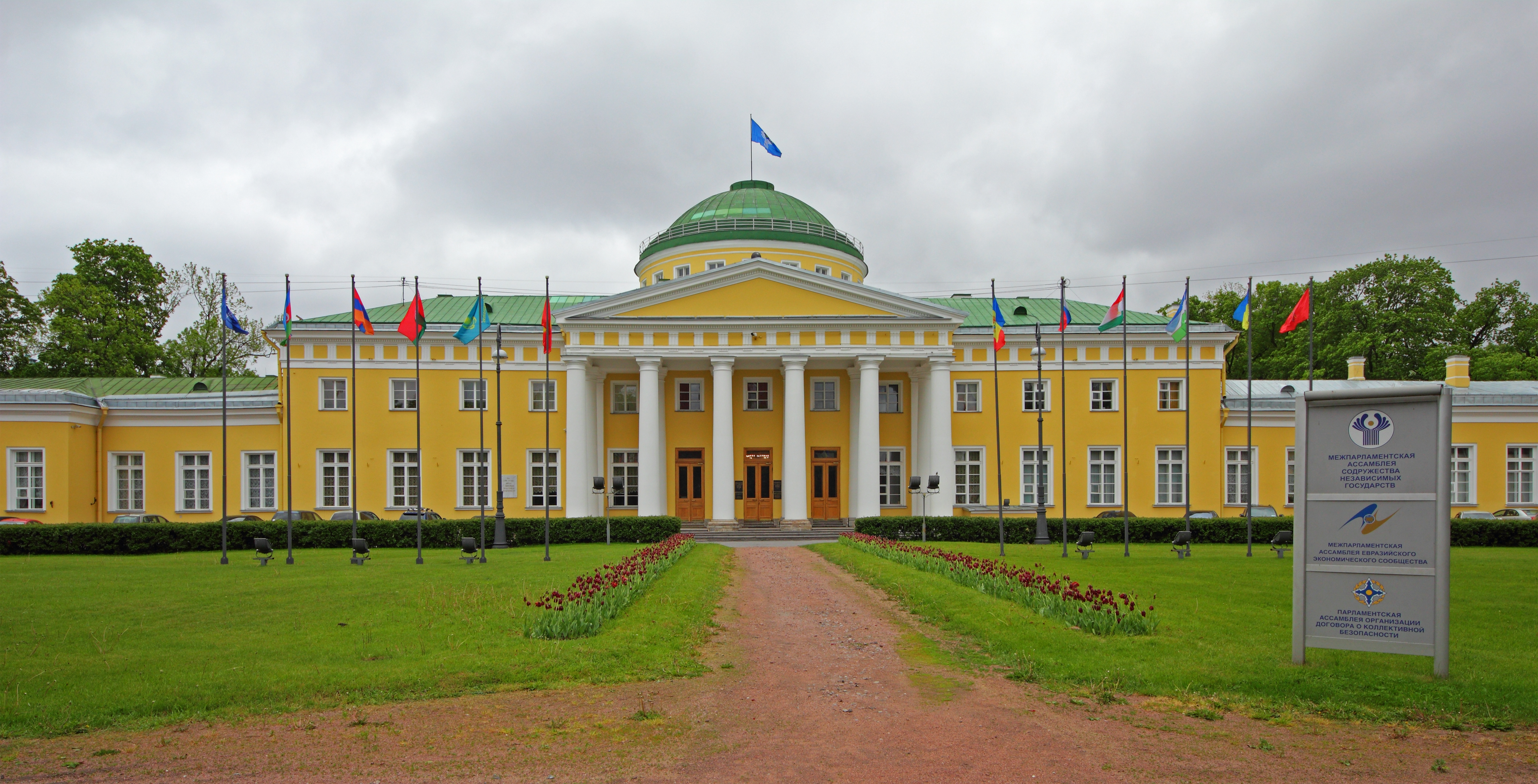
- Abbreviation: IPA CIS
- Predecessor: Supreme Soviet of the Soviet Union
- Formation: Almaty Protocol 1992
- Type: Regional inter-parliamentary organisation
- Headquarters: Saint Petersburg, Russia
- Members: 8 parliaments
- Official languages: Russian
- Secretary General: Dmitriy Kobitskiy
- Chairperson: Valentina Matviyenko
- Website: iacis.ru

The Interparliamentary Assembly of Member Nations of the Commonwealth of Independent States (IPA CIS) is a parliamentary assembly for delegations from the national parliaments of the member countries of the Commonwealth of Independent States (CIS) established in 1992.

The overarching mission is law-making and alignment of national laws in the CIS. The IPA CIS is housed in the Tauride Palace in a historical landmark of Saint Petersburg.

Member states maintain their sovereignty and independence, and any present or future agreements and associations within the CIS are based on equality and consensus.

Meetings of the Council of the Inter-Parliamentary Assembly of the Commonwealth of Independent States take place twice yearly.

== Creation ==
The IPA CIS had its origins in the Supreme Soviet of the Soviet Union and was established on 27 March 1992 in Alma-ata (Kazakhstan) under the terms of the Alma-Ata Protocol signed by heads of founding parliaments.

On 26 May 1995, CIS leaders signed the Convention on the Interparliamentary Assembly of Member Nations of the Commonwealth of Independent States eventually ratified by nine CIS parliaments. Georgia was the only member of the CIS that did not sign the Convention.

== Mission ==
The IPA CIS acts as the consultative parliamentary body of the CIS established to discuss problems of parliamentary cooperation.

The activity of the IPA concentrates on the development of the model legislation, which could then be implemented by the Member States on the voluntary basis, and serve as a tool of dissemination of the best practices across the CIS. The Assembly is involved in the development of integration processes in the CIS. The IPA CIS regularly hosts specialized conferences, seminars and symposiums, which provide a platform for debate of the governmental and non-governmental actors.

Another mission of the IPA CIS is election monitoring. Monitoring is organized by the International Institute for the Monitoring of Democratic Development, Parliamentarism and Suffrage Protection of Citizens of IPA CIS Member Nations (IIMDD IPA CIS). It was established by the decision of the IPA CIS Council of 10 February 2006. In accordance with the invitation of the national election commission the IPA CIS form an international Observer Team in order to perform long- and short-term monitoring of the preparation and holding of the presidential and parliamentary elections. Together with experts, international observers from the IPA CIS analyze the electoral legislation to assess its consistency with international democratic elections standards, check availability and readiness of technical means necessary for the voting process, visit polling stations and summarize the results.

== Membership ==
Member parliaments:

- Milli Mejlis of the Azerbaijan Republic
- National Assembly of Armenia
- National Assembly of the Republic of Belarus
- Kuryltai of the Republic of Kazakhstan
- Jogorku Kenesh of the Kyrgyz Republic
- Federal Assembly of the Russian Federation
- Majlisi Oli of the Republic of Tajikistan
- Oliy Majlis of the Republic of Uzbekistan

Former member parliament:

- Parliament of the Republic of Moldova

In July 2023, Moldova passed a law on denunciation of the agreement on Moldova's membership in the Inter-Parliamentary Assembly of the CIS countries which Moldova had become a full member of on 2 June 1998. Moldova formally withdrew from the assembly on 8 February 2024.

Former founding state:

- Ukraine, as a signatory of the Alma-Ata Protocol in 1992, was a founding state, but had not signed or ratified the 1995 convention, so had not become a member. In 2014 Ukraine stopped its cooperation with the Inter-Parliamentary Assembly. On 3 May 2023 Ukraine formally withdrew from the 1992 agreement.

== Composition ==
The IPA CIS includes the delegations of the parliaments of its Member States and operates on the basis of consensus (each delegation is assigned one vote). A Parliamentary Delegation consists of representatives elected or appointed by the Parliament of a Member Nation.

IPA CIS Council consists of Heads of Chambers of National Parliaments and is responsible for the organization of work of the Assembly. The Council is presided over by the Chairperson.

On 12 April 2018, the Speaker of the Federation Council of the Federal Assembly of the Russian Federation Valentina Matvienko was reelected the Chairperson of the IPA CIS Council. The IPA CIS Council Secretariat is the permanent administrative body to assist the Assembly, the Assembly Council, permanent and ad hoc commissions. Secretary General – Head of the IPA CIS Council Secretariat is Yury Osipov.

The IPA CIS has 10 Permanent Commissions:

- on Social Policy and Human Rights
- on Economy and Finance
- on Practices of State-Building and Local Government
- on Political Issues and International Cooperation
- on Agrarian Policy, Natural Resources and Ecology
- on Defense and Security Issues
- on Culture, Information, Tourism and Sport
- on Legal Issues
- on Science and Education
- Budget Oversight Commission

and a Joint Commission at the IPA CIS for the Harmonization of National Laws Related to Security, Countering Emerging Threats and Challenges.

Their mandate is to draft model laws, recommendations and other legislative instruments for subsequent approval at the sessions of the IPA CIS Council and the Assembly.

Partnerships and cooperation agreements

The Assembly has established partnership and signed cooperation agreements with leading international bodies, such as the United Nations, Parliamentary Assembly of the Council of Europe, Parliamentary Assembly of the Organization for Security and Co-operation in Europe, Organization of the Black Sea Economic Cooperation, Parliamentary Assembly of the Mediterranean, World Intellectual Property Organization, International Federation of Red Cross and Red Crescent Societies, UNESCO, UNIDO, the Latin American Parliament, the Central American Parliament, the Pan-African Parliament, the Inter-Parliamentary Union and several others.

== See also ==
- Commonwealth of Independent States
