= African Parliamentary Union =

Continental interparliamentary organization

- Union des Parlements Africains اتحاد البرلمانات الإفريقية União dos Parlamentos Africanos

Parliamentary Union overview
- Formed: February 13, 1976
- Headquarters: 30 Boulevard Roume, Plateau district, Abidjan, Côte d'Ivoire.
- Motto: For the promotion of democracy and stable development
- Parliamentary Union executives: Nzi Koffi, Secretary General; Rachid Talbi el-Alami (Morocco), Chairperson of the Executive Committee
- Website: www.apunion.org/english/

The African Parliamentary Union, formerly the Union of African Parliaments, is a continental interparliamentary organization first established in Abidjan on 13 February 1976. The Union aims to bring together the parliamentary institutions of all the nations of Africa, to encourage contacts among African and world parliamentarians, and to strengthen and promote democracy and peace. Forty parliaments are members of the APU.

The APU holds annual conferences in order to further its goals and also organizes parliamentary meetings in cooperation with International Organizations or Institutions.

The working languages of the Union are English, Arabic, French and Portuguese.

== Members ==

Non-members are Eritrea, Seychelles, Comoros, Mauritius, Madagascar, Tanzania, Zimbabwe, Malawi, Mozambique, Botswana, South Africa, Eswatini, Lesotho, and the Sahrawi Arab Democratic Republic.

== See also ==
- Pan-African Parliament
