= Parliamentary Union of the OIC Member States =

Association of Islamic parliaments

- Logo

History
- Founded: 17 June 1999

Leadership
- Secretary General: Mouhamed Khouraichi Niass

Meeting place
- Tehran, Iran

Website
- http://en.puic.org/

The Parliamentary Union of the OIC Member States (PUIC, PUOICM) is composed of the parliaments of the member states of the Organisation of Islamic Cooperation (OIC). It was established in Iran on 17 June 1999, with its head office situated in Tehran.

== Member states ==
A clickable Euler diagram showing the relationships between various multinational organisations within the Organisation of Islamic Cooperation

Member state	Year joined
Afghanistan	2008
Albania	1999
Algeria	1999
Azerbaijan	1999
Bahrain	1999
Bangladesh	1999
Benin	1999
Burkina Faso	1999
Cameroon	1999
Chad	1999
Comoros	2013
Côte d'Ivoire	1999
Djibouti	1999
Egypt	1999
Gabon	1999
Gambia	2009
Guinea	1999
Guinea-Bissau	1999
Guyana	1999
Indonesia	1999
Iran	1999
Iraq	1999
Jordan	1999
Kazakhstan	1999
Kuwait	1999
Kyrgyzstan	1999
Lebanon	1999
Libya	1999
Malaysia	1999
Maldives	2012
Mali	1999
Mauritania	1999
Morocco	1999
Mozambique	1999
Niger	1999
Nigeria	2015
Oman	1999
Pakistan	1999
Palestine	1999
Qatar	1999
Saudi Arabia	1999
Senegal	1999
Sierra Leone	1999
Somalia	2007
Sudan	1999
Syria	1999
Tajikistan	2006
Togo	1999
Tunisia	1999
Turkey	1999
Turkmenistan	1999
Uganda	1999
United Arab Emirates	1999
Yemen	1999

== Non-participating states ==
Non-participating state
Brunei
Suriname
Uzbekistan

== Observers ==
Inter-Parliamentary Union (IPU)
Arab Parliamentary Union] Arab IPU
African Parliamentary Union
Asian Parliamentary Assembly
The Consultative Council of the Maghreb Arab Union
The Organization of the Islamic Conference (OIC)]
League of Arab States
African Union
International Committee of the Red Cross (ICRC)
Northern Cyprus (Turkish Cypriot State)
The Inter-Parliamentary Assembly of the Commonwealth for the Independent States(IPA CIS)
Parliamentary Assembly of the Mediterranean (PAM)
Islamic Conference Youth Forum for Dialogue and Cooperation (ICYF – DC)
Research Center For Islamic History, Art And Culture (IRCICA)
Islamic World Educational, Scientific and Cultural Organization (ICESCO)
Parliamentary Assembly of The Black Sea Economic Cooperation (PABSEC)
Parliamentary Assembly of Turkic-Speaking Countries (TURKPA)
The Statistical, Economic and Social Research and Training Centre for Islamic Countries (SESRIC)
Parliamentary Assembly Union of Belarus And Russia
Arab Parliament

== Secretary General ==
The first Secretary General was Egyptian diplomat Mr. Ibrahim Ahmed Auf, who served for two terms from 1 March 2000 to 30 April 2008. On 1 May 2008, Prof. Dr. Mahmud Erol Kilic from Turkey was appointed as the second Secretary General, who served two terms from 1 May 2008 to 31 July 2018. Mr. Cheikh Mouhamed Khouraichi Niass from Senegal is the Secretary General of the PUIC from 1 August 2018. He was elected at the 13th PUIC Conference held in Tehran.

PUIC Standing Specialized Committees:

- Committee on Political and Foreign Relations
- Committee on Economic Affairs and Environment
- Committee on Human Rights, Women and Family Affairs
- Committee on Cultural and Legal Affairs and Dialogue of Civilizations and Religions
