= International parliament =

Branch of an intergovernmental organization tasked with legislative powers

An international parliament or world parliament or supranational legislature is a theoretical or hypothetical concept that envisions a legislative body with representatives from different countries or sovereign entities, similar to a parliament but at international level for global governance, thus establishing a world government. It is a hybrid system of intergovernmentalism and supranationalism which could be based on a predecessor inter-parliamentary institution or a newly established organization-level legislature.

== Supranational parliament ==
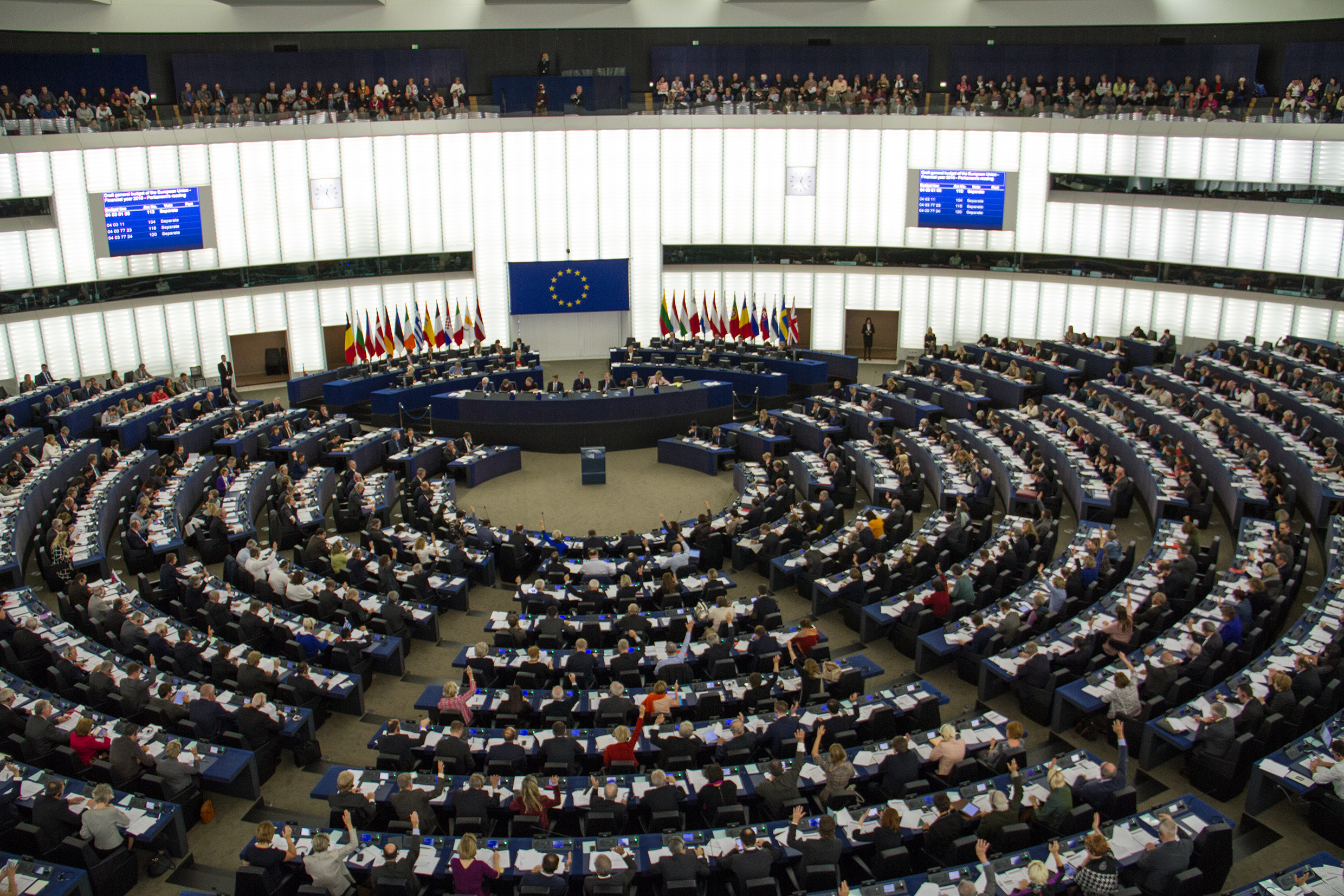
The European Parliament

European Parliament is the closest thing to an International parliament in current systems. Inter-parliamentary institutions generally do not have legislative powers; an exception is the European Parliament, which has legislative powers in the European Union. While the European Parliament does represent citizens from different EU member states, it is not a global or international parliament in the sense of representing countries from all over the world. So, while the European Parliament is a type of supranational parliament at the regional level, the broader idea of an international parliament that encompasses all countries globally is yet to be realized.

== Proposals ==
The idea of an international parliament or a world parliament has been around for many years, and various organizations and movements advocate for its establishment. The ultimate goal is to have a directly elected or representative global body that can address global challenges and promote peace, security, and sustainable development on a worldwide scale. Following are the few prominent proposals:

=== United Nations Parliamentary Assembly ===
The relationship between the UNPA and the concept of an "International Parliament" is that the UNPA would effectively serve as a form of international parliamentary body. It would bring together representatives from different countries to discuss global issues, propose resolutions, and offer recommendations to the existing UN bodies such as the General Assembly, the Security Council, and other specialized agencies.

=== Provisional World Parliament ===
The Provisional World Parliament (PWP) is an irregular meeting of activists aimed at establishing an actual world parliament and a democratic world government, operating under the "Constitution for the Federation of Earth", which emerged from conventions fostered by the world federalist movement since the 1950s. No country has ratified this constitution, or become a member of the PWP so far.

== See also ==
- Inter-Parliamentary Union
- Parliamentary assembly
- International Parliament for Safety and Peace
- List of legislatures by country
