= Noora bint Hathal Al Dosari =

Qatari royal

Consort to the Emir of Qatar
- Tenure: 25 February 2014 –
- Born: 1995 (age 30–31)
- Spouse: Tamim bin Hamad Al Thani (m. 2014)
- Issue: Sheikh Joa'an bin Tamim Al Thani; Sheikh Mohammed bin Tamim Al Thani; Sheikh Fahad bin Tamim Al Thani; Sheikha Hind bint Tamim Al Thani
- House: Thani (by marriage)
- Father: Hathal Al Dosairi

Noora bint Hathal Al Dosari (Arabic: نورة بنت هذال الرجباني الدوسري) is a Qatari royal and the third wife of Sheikh Tamim bin Hamad Al Thani, the emir of Qatar.

== Biography ==
On 25 February 2014, Noora bint Hathal Al Dosari married Sheikh Tamim bin Hamad Al Thani, the Emir of Qatar. She is the Emir's third wife, after Sheikha Jawaher bint Hamad bin Suhaim Al Thani and Sheikha Al-Anoud bint Mana Al Hajri.

They have four children, three sons and one daughter:

- Sheikh Joa'an bin Tamim bin Hamad Al Thani (born 27 March 2015)
- Sheikh Mohammed bin Tamim bin Hamad Al Thani (born 17 July 2017)
- Sheikh Fahad bin Tamim bin Hamad Al Thani (born 16 June 2018)
- Sheikha Hind bint Tamim bin Hamad Al Thani (born 5 February 2020)

In February 2023, Al Dosari accompanied her husband on an official visit to Spain. She visited the Nasrid palaces of Alhambra while they were in Spain.

Styles of Sheikha Noora
- Reference style: Her Highness
- Spoken style: Your Highness
- Alternative style: Sheikha
