= Tamim bin Hamad Al Thani =

Emir of Qatar since 2013

Tamim bin Hamad Al Thani; تؘمؚيم بؚن حؘمؘد آل ثَانِي
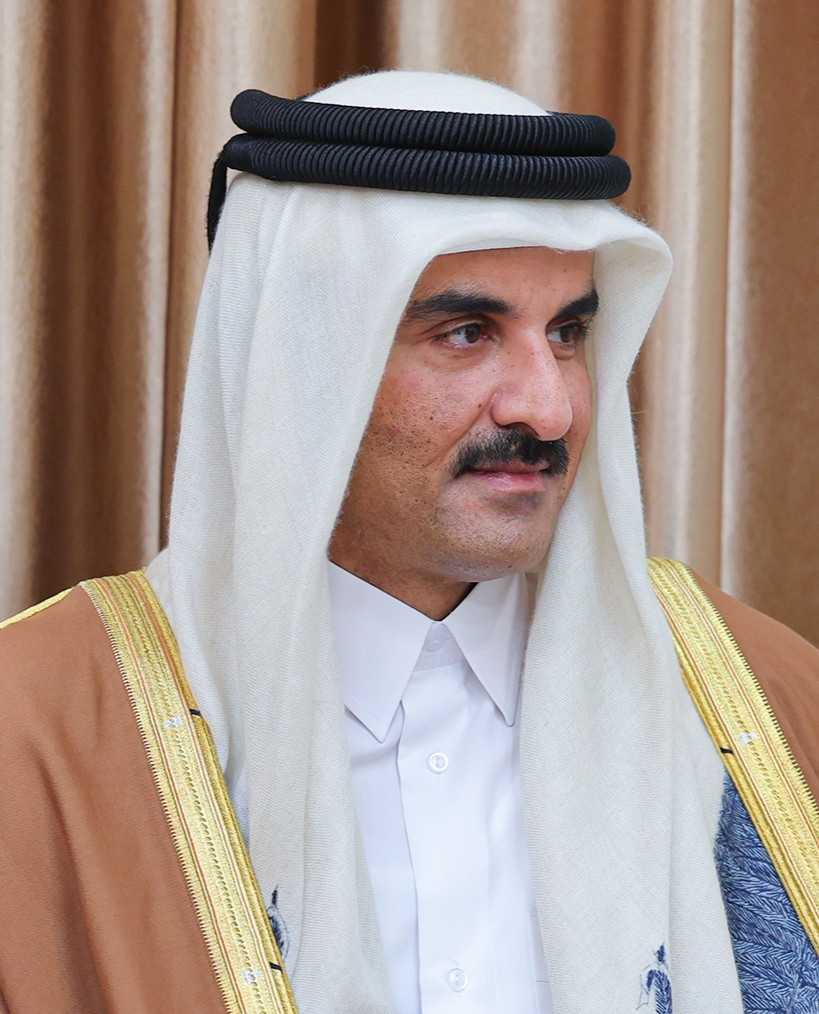
- Tamim in 2025

Emir of Qatar
- Reign: 25 June 2013 – present
- Predecessor: Hamad bin Khalifa Al Thani
- Deputy Emir: Abdullah bin Hamad Al Thani
- Born: 3 June 1980 (age 46); Doha, Qatar
- Spouse: Jawaher bint Hamad Al Thani (m. 2005) Al-Anoud bint Mana Al Hajri (m. 2009) Noora bint Hathal Al Dosari (m. 2014)
- Issue Detail: Sheikha Al Mayassa; Sheikh Hamad; Sheikha Aisha; Sheikha Naylah; Sheikh Jassim; Sheikh Abdullah; Sheikha Rodha; Sheikh Joa'an; Sheikh Alqaqa'a; Sheikh Mohammed; Sheikha Moza; Sheikh Fahad; Sheikha Hind
Names
- Tamim bin Hamad Al Thani
- House: Al Thani
- Father: Sheikh Hamad bin Khalifa Al Thani
- Mother: Sheikha Moza bint Nasser al-Misnad
- Military career
- Allegiance: Qatar
- Branch: Qatar Armed Forces
- Service years: 2013–present

Styles of Emir of Qatar
- Reference style: His Highness
- Spoken style: Your Highness
- Alternative style: Sheikh

Tamim bin Hamad bin Khalifa Al Thani (Arabic: تؘمؚيم بؚن حؘمؘد بؚن خَلِيفَة آل ثَانِي, romanized: Tamīm bin Ḥamad bin Khalīfa Āl Thānī; born 3 June 1980) is the Emir of Qatar, reigning since 25 June 2013. He became the heir apparent in 2003 after his elder brother Sheikh Jassim renounced his claim. He is the fourth son of the former emir, Hamad bin Khalifa Al Thani. After his father abdicated in 2013, Tamim became one of the world's youngest monarchs. He received his education in the UK and graduated in 1998 from the Royal Military Academy Sandhurst.

Tamim has total executive and legislative power in Qatar. The 2022 FIFA World Cup and major infrastructure improvements under the Qatar National Vision 2030 mark two developmental milestones of his reign. Although his administration has been under constant scrutiny from human rights organizations regarding the conditions of migrant workers, his government has started a number of labor reforms pertaining to the traditional Kafala system. In 2021, he also instituted the first legislative elections for the Shura Council in Qatar, which were later changed after a 2024 constitutional referendum.

Under Tamim, Qatar has acted as a frequent diplomatic mediator, maintaining active relationships with distinct geopolitical factions. He led Qatar through a three-year diplomatic crisis after neighboring Gulf states severed ties with the country. As head of the House of Thani, he oversees the State of Qatar’s sovereign wealth fund, the Qatar Investment Authority.

== Early life and education ==
Tamim bin Hamad was born on 3 June 1980 in Doha, Qatar. He is the fourth son of Sheikh Hamad bin Khalifa Al Thani, and second son of Sheikha Moza bint Nasser Al-Missned, Hamad's second wife. Tamim was educated at the UK's Sherborne School (International College) in Dorset, and at Harrow School, where he sat his A-Levels in 1997. He then attended the Royal Military Academy Sandhurst, graduating in 1998.

== Career ==
Sheikh Tamim was commissioned as a second lieutenant in the Qatar Armed Forces upon graduation from Sandhurst. He became the heir apparent to the Qatari throne on 5 August 2003, when his elder brother Sheikh Jassim renounced his claim to the title. Since then he was groomed to take over rule, working in top security and economics posts. On 5 August 2003, he was appointed deputy commander-in-chief of Qatar's armed forces.

Sheikh Tamim promoted sport as part of Qatar's bid to raise its international profile. In 2005 he founded Oryx Qatar Sports Investments, which owns Paris Saint-Germain F.C. among other investments. In 2006, he chaired the organizing committee of the 15th Asian Games in Doha. Under his leadership, all member countries attended the event for the first time in its history. That year's Al Ahram voted Tamim "the best sport personality in the Arab world". Under his guidance, Qatar won the rights to host the 2014 FINA Swimming World Championships and the 2022 FIFA World Cup. Tamim is chairman of the National Olympic Committee. At the 113th session of the International Olympic Committee (IOC) in February 2002, he was elected as a member of the IOC. He headed Doha's bid for the 2020 Olympics. The country hosted the 2022 FIFA World Cup. Qatar is estimated to have spent around $200 billion on infrastructure in preparation for the event.

The Olympic Council of Asia (OCA) Evaluation Committee completed its tour to Doha in November 2020, and confirmed that the city will have much to offer for the Asian Games, and that they were satisfied with the prioritizing and support from Tamim. At the 39th General Assembly of the OCA, President Ahmed Al-Fahad Al-Ahmed Al-Sabah announced that Doha would host the 2030 Asian Games.

Sheikh Tamim heads the Qatar Investment Authority board of directors. Under his leadership, the fund has invested billions in British businesses. It owns large stakes in Barclays Bank, Sainsbury's, and Harrods. The fund also owns a 95% share of Europe's fourth tallest building, the Shard, a skyscraper in London.

Tamim has also held a number of other posts, including:

- Head of the Upper Council of the Environment and Natural Sanctuaries.
- Chairman of the Supreme Council for the Environment and Natural Reserves.
- Chairman of the Supreme Education Council.
- Chairman of the Supreme Council of Information and Communication Technology.
- Chairman of the board of directors of Public Works Authority (Ashghal) and the Urban Planning and Development Authority (UPDA).
- Chairman of the board of regents of Qatar University.
- Deputy chairman of the Ruling Family Council.
- Vice president of the Supreme Council for Economic Affairs and Investment.
- Deputy chairman of the High Committee for Coordination and Follow Up.
- Member of "Sports for All".

== Reign ==
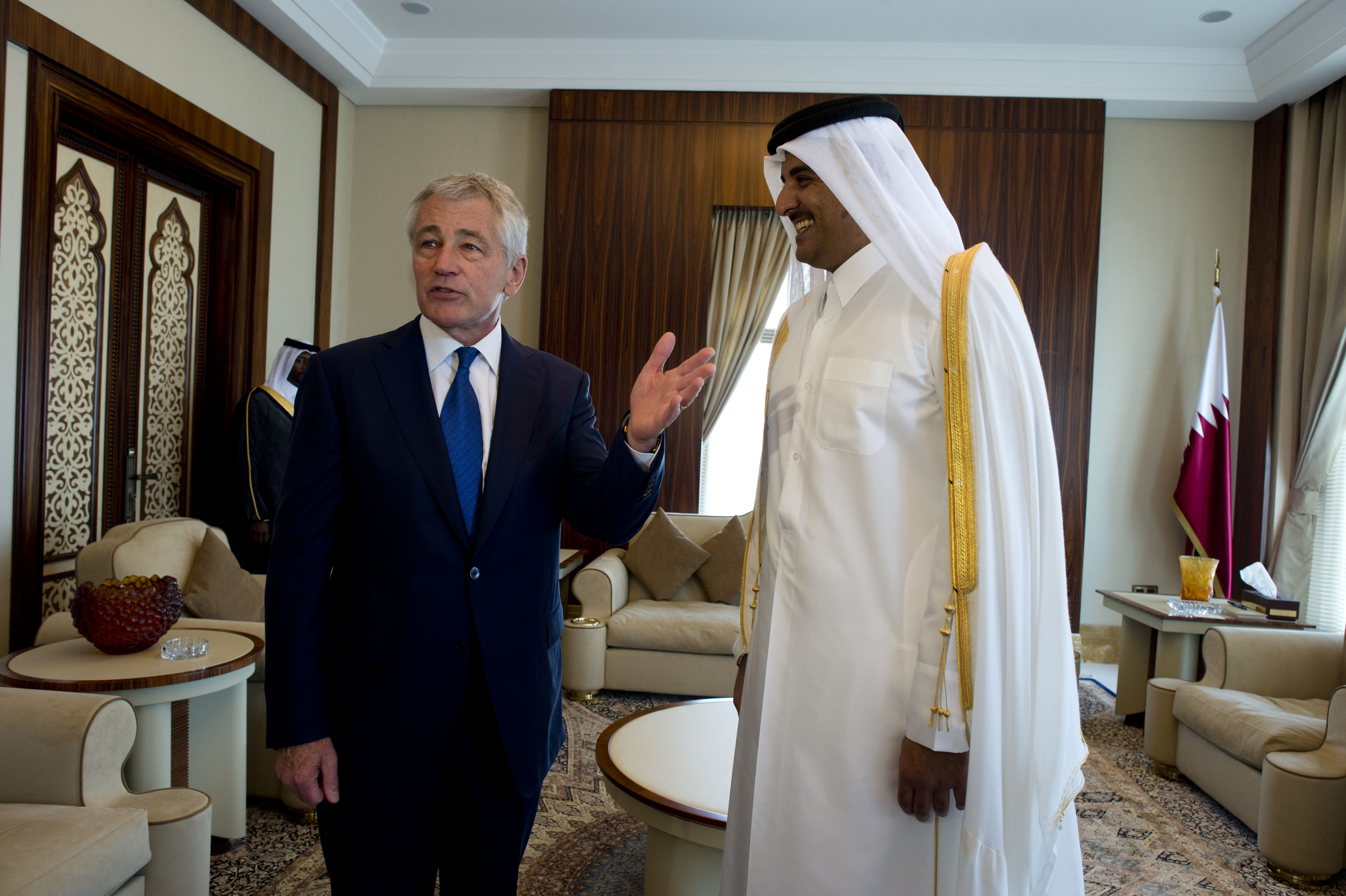
Sheikh Tamim with U.S. Secretary of Defense Chuck Hagel, 10 December 2013

On 25 June 2013, Tamim's father, Sheikh Hamad bin Khalifa Al Thani, revealed to close relatives and aides that he planned to step down as the Emir of Qatar. Tamim then became the Emir of Qatar after his father handed over power in a televised speech. While the previous two Qatari rulers from the Al Thani family ascended to power in bloodless coups, Tamim was the first to ascend to power via an abdication. According to The Economist, of his siblings who had previously contended for the throne, "One played too much, the other prayed too much." The transition of power went smoothly, as family members hold many of Qatar's top posts.

According to a diplomatic source close to the Al Thani family, Sheikh Tamim has "a strong personality" that allowed him to "establish himself within" the ruling House of Thani. He became crown prince on 5 August 2003, after his brother Sheikh Jassim had stepped down. Diplomats quoted by the BBC argued that Jassim, who served as crown prince for eight years, had hoped to expand his political powers. In 2003, Sheikh Jassim stepped down from the position of crown prince. According to Qatar News Agency Jassim sent a letter to his father saying, "The time is appropriate to step down and prepare for a successor". In the letter, Jassim stated, "I did not want, as I have told you from the start, to be appointed as crown prince" and said that he had only accepted the position in October 1996 because of "sensitive circumstances". According to a report by Stratfor, Jassim had no allies among the military forces or secret police at the time of the 2013 political transition, and thus had few chances to overturn Hamad's decree.

=== Domestic policy ===
Tamim rules an authoritarian regime. He holds all executive and legislative authority in Qatar; political parties are forbidden, and elections are not free and fair. The citizens of Qatar have limited political rights and civil liberties.

One of Tamim's first moves after coming to power was to merge bureaucracies, such as the Qatar National Food Security Program, which was incorporated into the Ministries of Economy and Agriculture. He lowered the budget of the Qatar Foundation and Qatar Museums Authority and other institutions.

Since his accession to power, the government has expanded the roads around the capital, developed the new Doha Metro system, and completed the construction of a new airport, the Hamad International Airport. During the Arab Spring, Tamim promised to establish a directive to lower the price of foodstuffs sold by companies working with the country's National Food Security Programme and anticipated social allowances and pension increases.

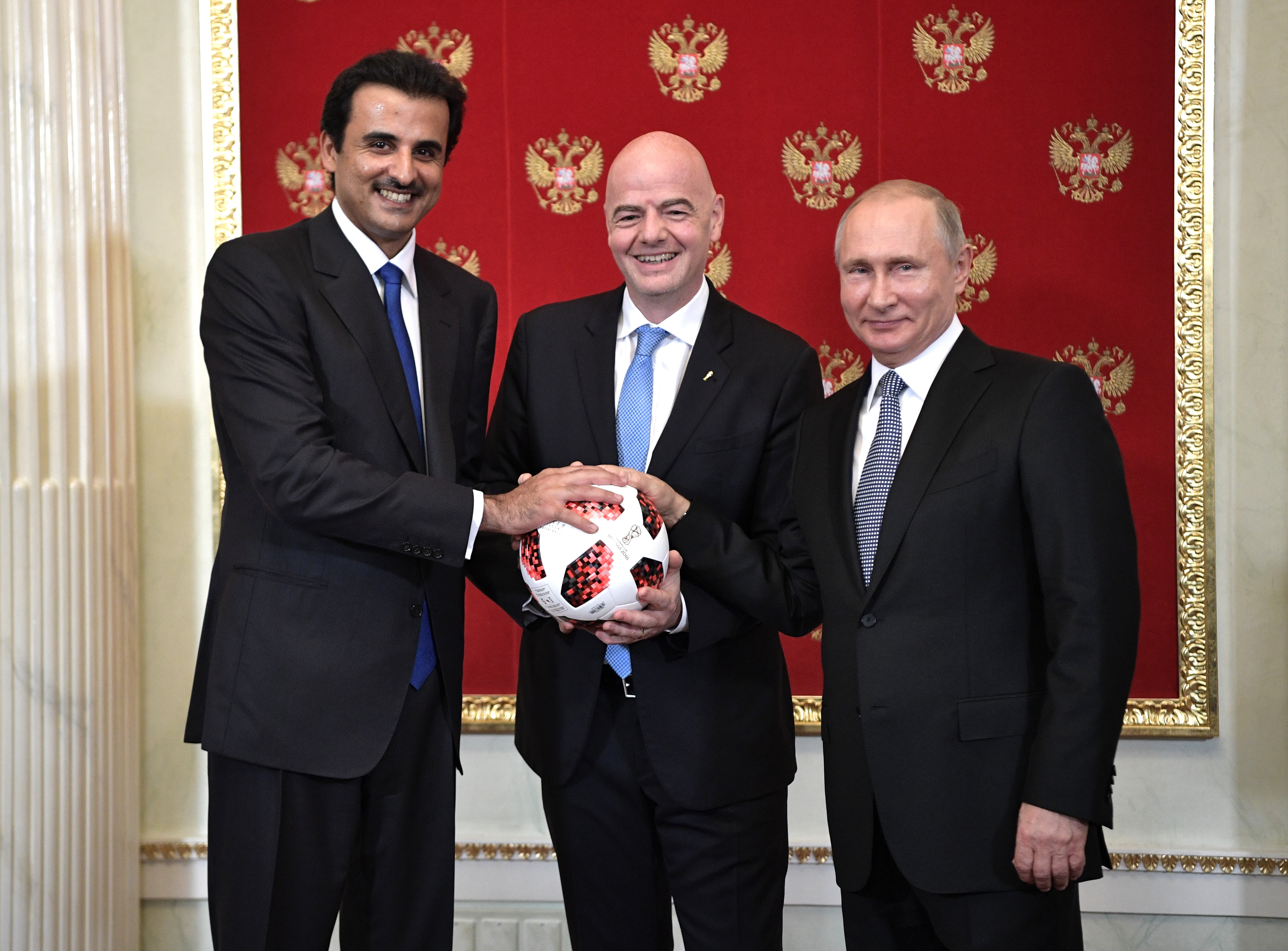
Russia handing over the symbolic relay baton for the hosting rights of the 2022 FIFA World Cup to Qatar in June 2018

In his inaugural speech on 26 June 2013, Sheikh Tamim pledged to continue to diversify Qatar's economy away from hydrocarbons.

In June 2013, Sheikh Tamim unveiled his new cabinet. Khalid bin Mohammad Al Attiyah was named foreign minister. Unlike previous appointees to this post, Al Attiyah was a non-royal. Tamim made Hessa Al Jaber the first ever Minister of Information and Communications Technology in Qatar in 2013. She was the third female minister to be named to the cabinet.

In 2014, Tamim passed new "cybercrime" legislation, which was said to be part of an agreement among Gulf states to criminalize online insults of the region's royal families. The law outlawed the spreading of "false news" as well as digital material that violates the country's "social values" or "general order". The legislation made it illegal to incite, aid and facilitate the publication of offensive material. The law was criticized as being intended by the authoritarian regime to silence dissent in Qatar. Amnesty International called the law "a major setback for freedom of expression in Qatar" and other critics suggest that the new law will violate provisions of the country's constitution that protect civil liberties.

In January 2016, Tamim made additional changes to his cabinet. He named a new foreign minister, Mohammed bin Abdulrahman bin Jassim Al Thani, moving the previous foreign minister, Khalid bin Mohammad Al Attiyah, to the position of Minister of State for Defense Affairs. Tamim also merged several ministries, including communication and transport, culture, youth and sports. Journalists have speculated reasons behind the cabinet changes. Some have come to the conclusion that the reorganization was either an economic move, meant to save the country money at a time when the falling price of gas had forced the country to scale back its workforce or for reasons of political stability. Eurasia Group indicated in a report that the cabinet change aimed to increase efficiency in government operations and would not negatively impact political or economic stability. According to others the appointments showed that Tamim was trying to make the government his own by bringing in a new, younger generation of ministers that were more loyal to him than to his father.

==== First legislative election and scrapping thereof ====
On 2 October 2021, elections for 30 out of 45 seats of the Shura Council were held for the first time, after many postponements since 2005. The other 15 remained appointed by the Emir, giving this minority group and his cabinet overwhelming power of decision making on issues of defense, foreign policy and other critical issues of the state. The Assembly's powers are limited. The body can only question the prime minister, who is appointed by the Emir of Qatar, on his policies if two-thirds of the members agree, which was unlikely given that one third of its members were appointed by the Emir. Some observers, especially after the abolishment of further elections in 2024, noted that the timing of the election, after many delays, shortly before the 2022 FIFA World Cup, suggested that the election had more to do with Qatar wanting to improve its international image than with genuine political liberalization.

Eligibility for the vote was limited to people aged 18 years and up who had a grandfather born in Qatar; candidates were required to be at least 30 years of age and of Qatari origin. Some members of the seminomadic Al Murrah tribe were barred from the election, causing discontent among some members of the tribe, and drawing criticism from international human rights organisations, who characterised it as "arbitrary voter disenfranchisement. Some members and supporters of the Al Murrah tribe were arrested after protesting the law. Human rights organisations criticised this as repression of the right to free expression and freedom of assembly. After the vote controversy, Tamim pledged equal citizenship and ordered legal amendments.

In November 2024, the initial experiment of legislative elections that took place in the 2021 general poll was formally discontinued. The electoral component for the advisory assembly was eliminated, scrapping the planned "general election" process for its seats and returning the appointment power to the Emir.

==== Labour rights ====
During Tamim's rule, Qatar's abuse and exploitation of foreign migrant labourers (mostly Indians and Nepalese) has been a subject of international controversy, in particular in the lead-up to the 2022 FIFA World Cup. Despite several steps of reform, in their reports for 2025 both Human Rights Watch and Amnesty International have found that foreign labourers continue to face widespread abuses under a "restrictive" and "exploitative" Kafala system.

Two laws protecting workers' rights, which included clauses on maximum working hours and rights to annual leave, were passed by Sheikh Tamim in 2017. The next year, Sheikh Tamim passed Law No. 13 of 2018, abolishing exit visas for roughly 95% of the country's migrant workers. The remaining 5% of workers, which amount to approximately 174,000 people, still require their employer's permission to exit the country. Amnesty International described the step taken by the Emir as an "important first step towards meeting the authorities' promise to fundamentally reform the exploitative sponsorship system" but called on the government to follow through with more reforms.

In November 2017, Qatar and the International Labour Organization (ILO) started a technical cooperation programme to improve working conditions and labour rights. The ILO opened its first project office in Qatar in April 2018.

Following the adoption on 30 August 2020 of Law No. 19 of 2020, migrant workers can now change jobs before the end of their contract without first having to obtain a no objection certificate (NOC) from their employer. In March 2021, Qatar implemented a monthly minimum wage of 1,000 riyals (USD 275) for all workers, making it the first country in the region to do so.

=== Foreign policy ===
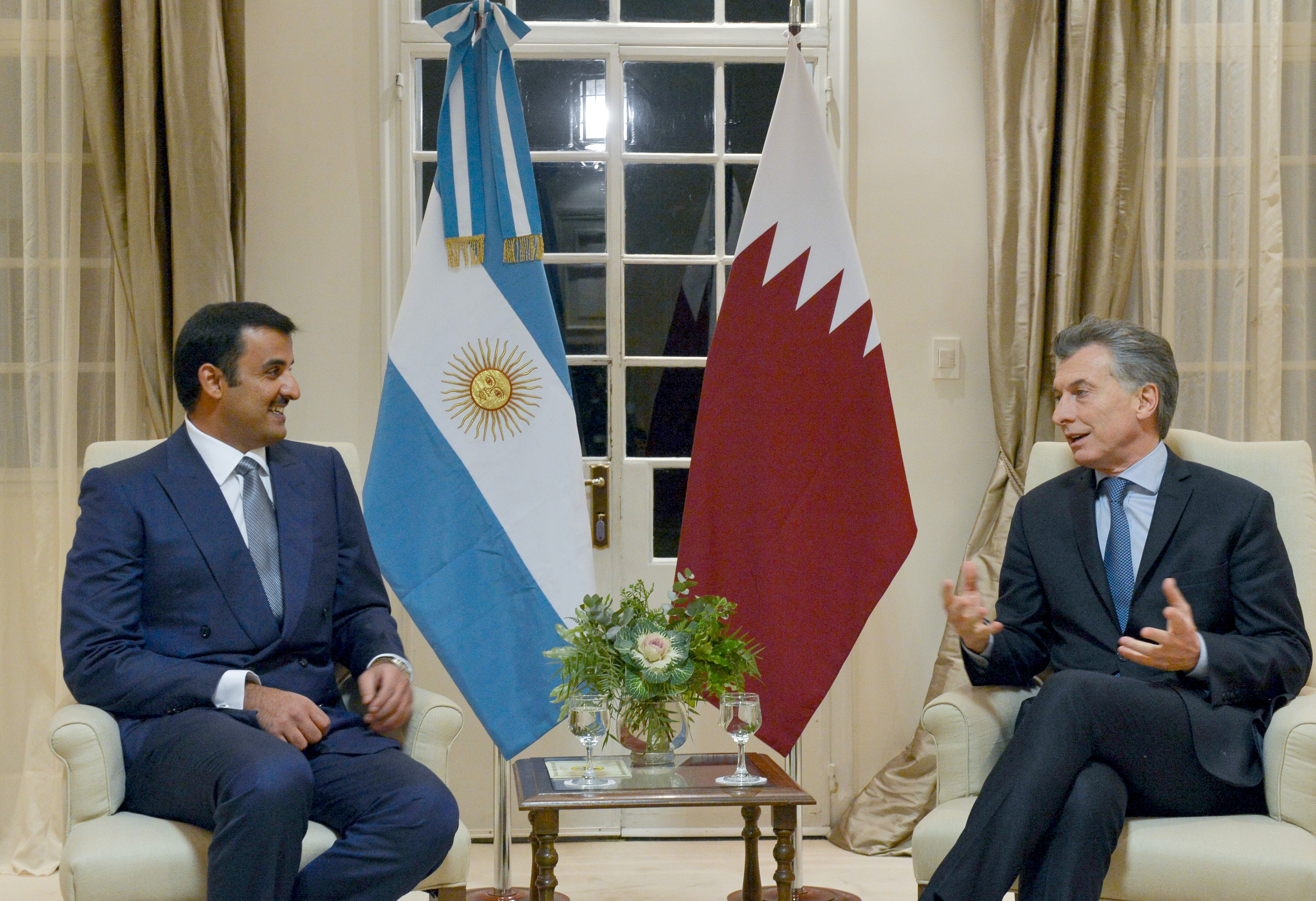
Sheikh Tamim with Argentinian president Mauricio Macri at the Presidential Residence of Olivos in Buenos Aires, July 2016

Tamim's transition to power was welcomed by leaders across the world, who expected him to continue to work in his father's footsteps and increase Qatar's role in vital international affairs, including the Syrian crisis and Darfur agreement.

Analysts said he would be tasked with overseeing substantial upgrades to the national infrastructure, which have recently gotten underway. While some view Tamim as more religious than his father, most analysts expect him to retain his father's largely pragmatic habits of governing – using Islam to further objectives where useful, but not pushing strictly Islamic agenda items such as outlawing alcohol. In 2020, the Qatari government condemned "populist rhetoric inciting the abuse of religions" and "hate speech based on belief, race or religion." From 2020 onward, Qatar took gradual steps to remove hateful or violent content from school textbooks.

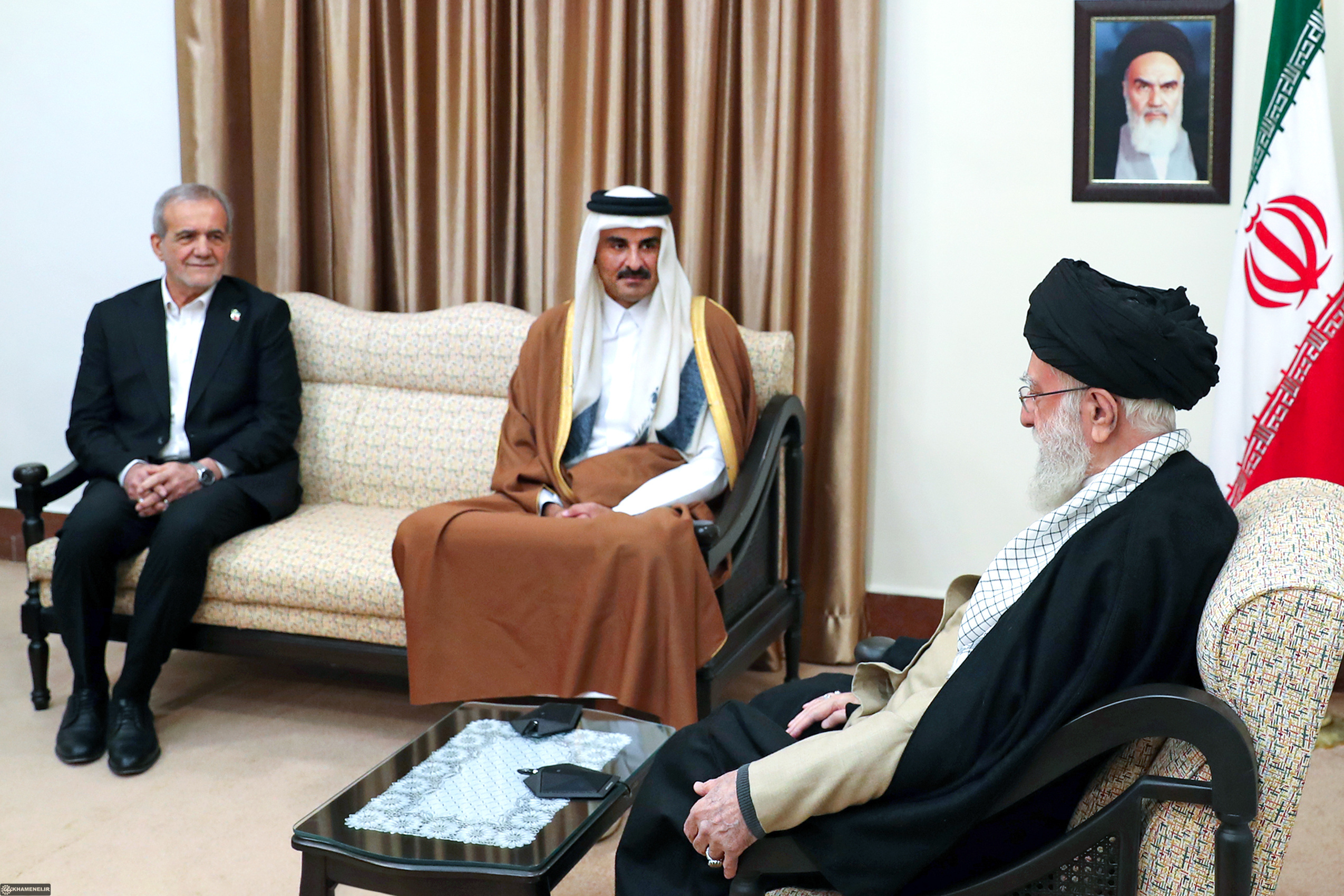
Tamim with Iran's Ayatollah Ali Khamenei and President Masoud Pezeshkian in Tehran, 19 February 2025

In his inaugural speech to the nation, Tamim vowed that he would continue to pursue a central role for Qatar in the region but that he will not "take direction" in foreign affairs. He committed to the "highest possible level of integration" with his Gulf neighbors.

In May 2022, Tamim met in Iran with Ayatollah Ali Khamenei and Iranian president Ebrahim Raisi. Tamim expressed satisfaction with his second visit to Iran and pointed to the prominent position of the Leader of the Islamic Revolution in the Islamic world and said: "The crimes of the Zionist regime in Palestine are horrible and we must all stand against the events in Palestine". Tamim also discussed the solution to the problems of the countries in the region, including Syria, Iraq and Yemen, and also mentioned the economic relations between Iran and Qatar, saying: "The Economic Committee between the two countries has become active, and we hope that economic cooperation will significantly improve by next year".

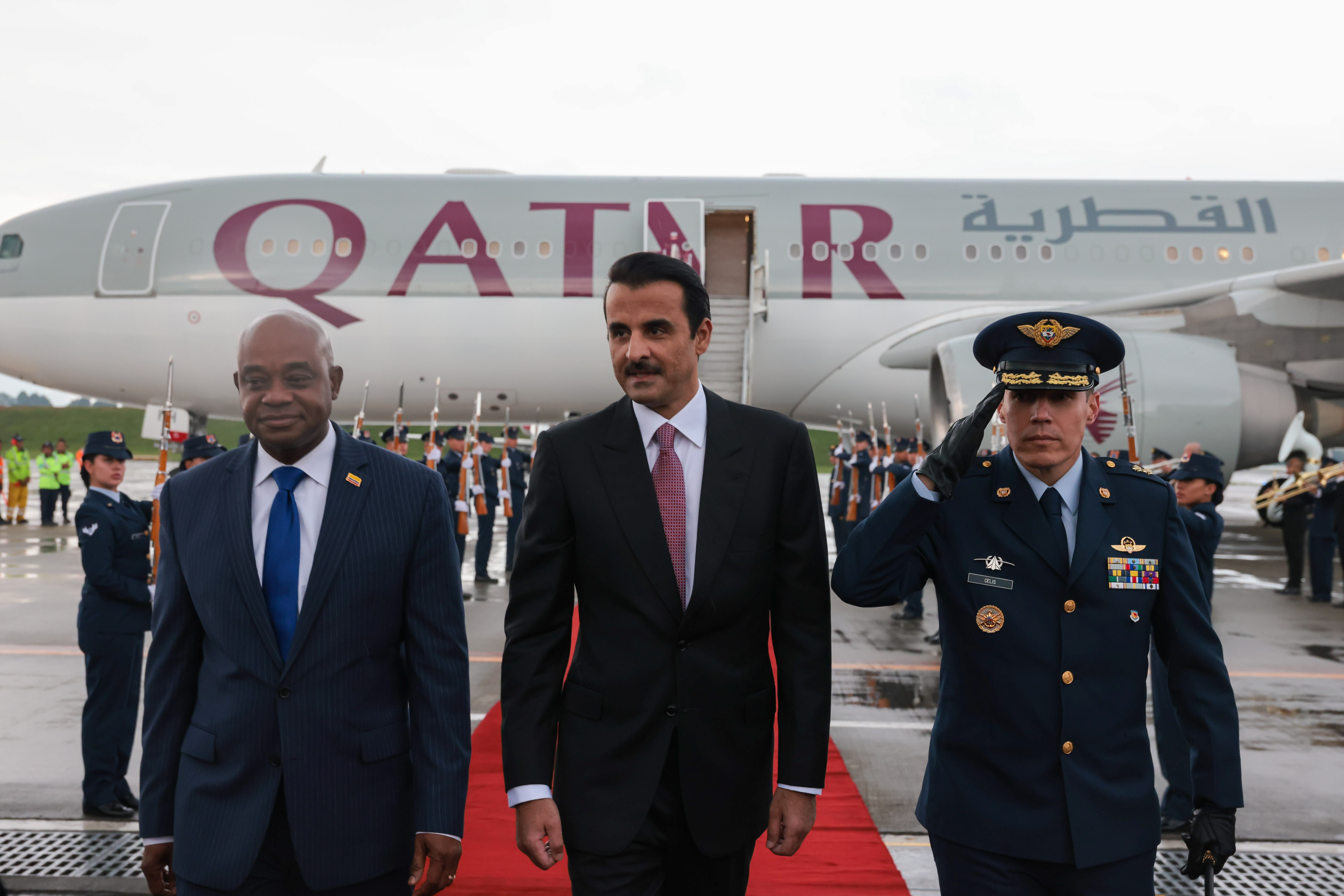
Tamim in Colombia, November 2024

In late October 2013, a few months after taking charge, Sheikh Tamim took a regional tour of the Gulf. Even before his accession to power, he formally represented his father at the annual Gulf Cooperation Council (GCC) Summit in Bahrain in December 2012 and welcomed delegates to the Arab League Summit in Doha in March 2013.

Working in a government security post, he promoted stronger ties with Saudi Arabia, a neighbour and often contentious rival to Qatar. Tamim considers Qatar's rivalry with Saudi Arabia unproductive, as has been the case in the so far unsuccessful attempt to build a cohesive Syrian opposition. Despite this, Tamim worked within the GCC to support the Syrian opposition.

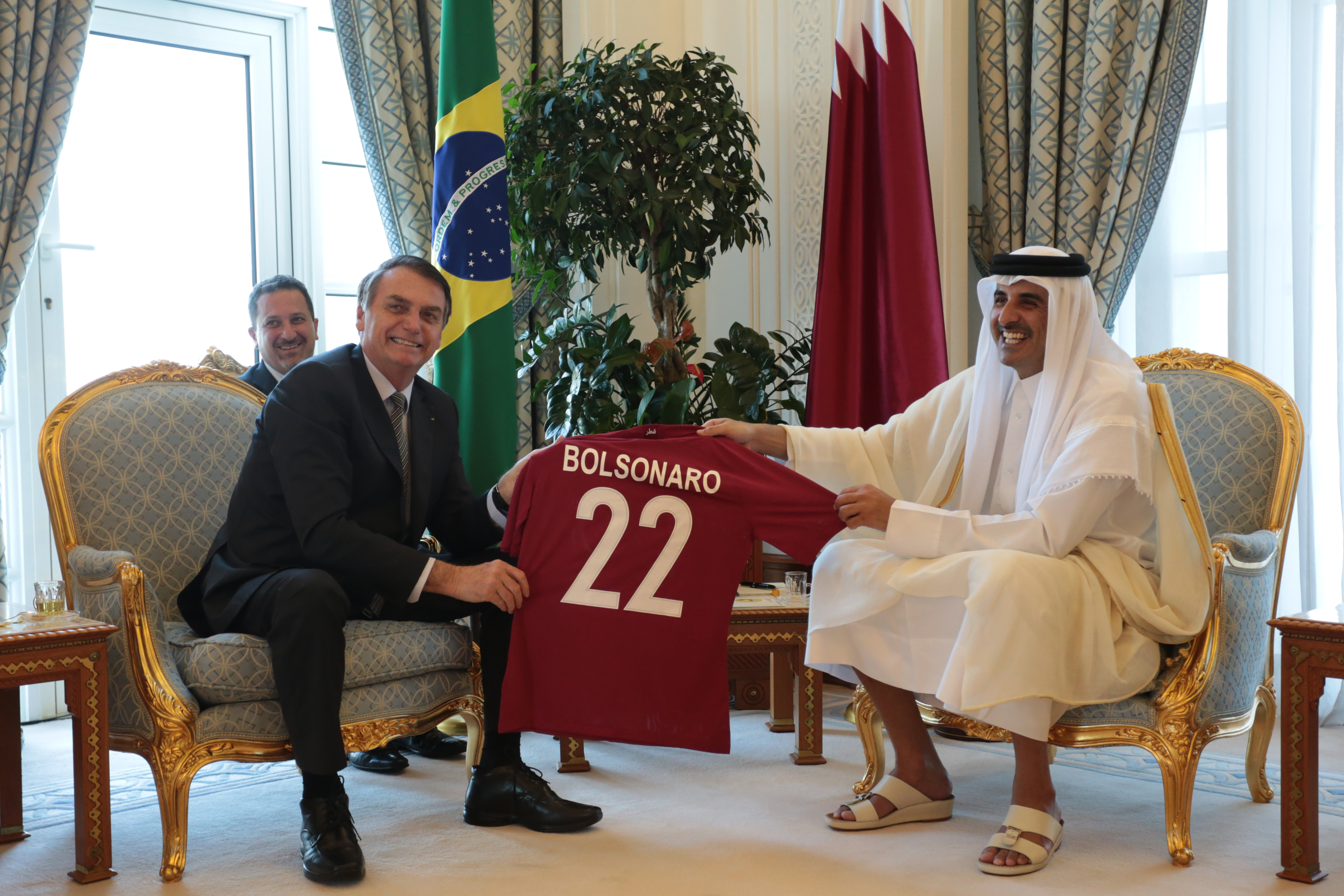
Thani with Brazilian President Jair Bolsonaro on 28 October 2019

Qatar has also provided aid through loans and investments to the democratically elected Ennahdha Party in Tunisia, and to parties in Yemen and Morocco.

==== Relations with Arab countries ====
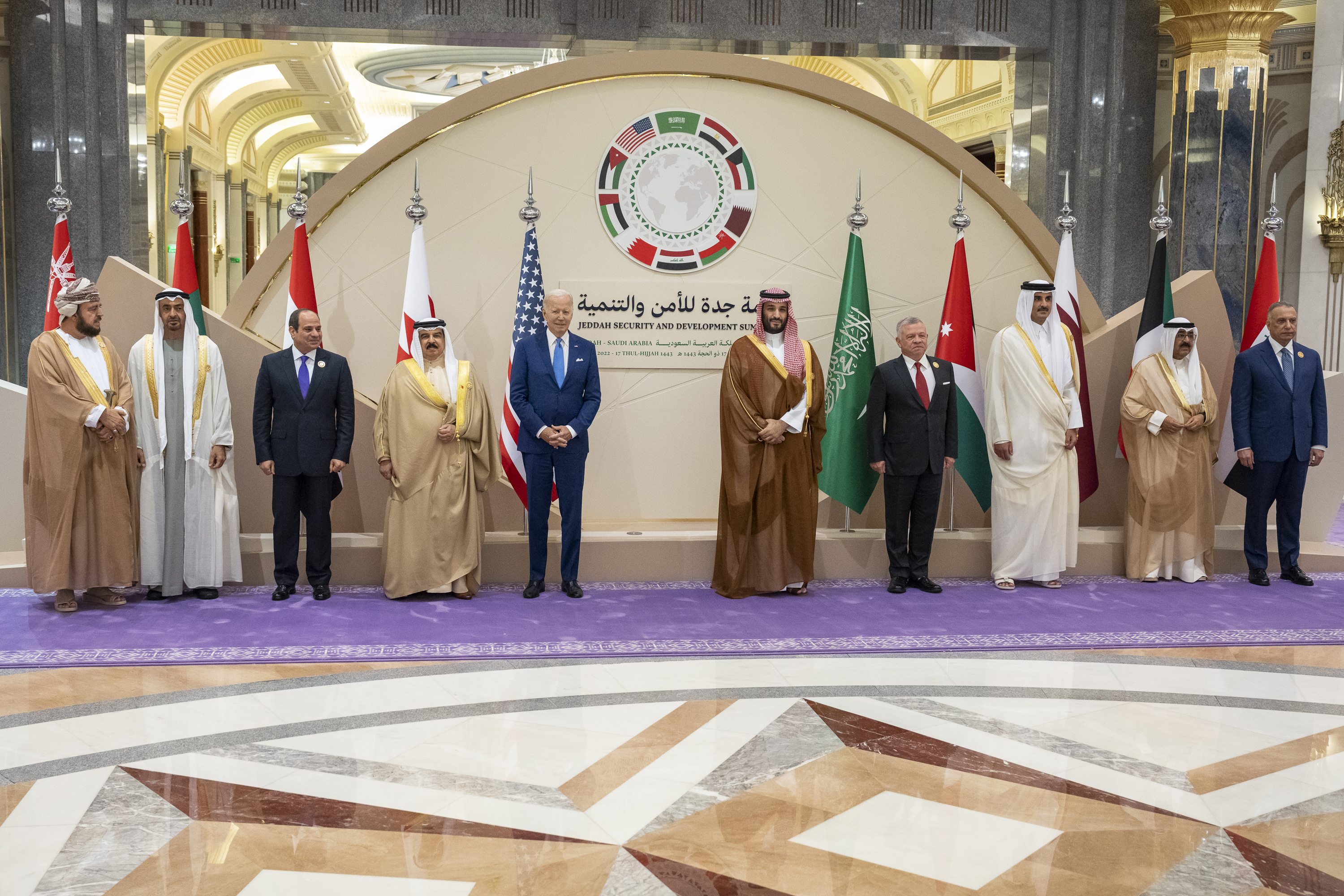
Arab leaders, U.S. president Joe Biden and Tamim (third from right) at the GCC+3 summit in Jeddah, 16 July 2022

Since the 2011 Arab Spring, Qatar vied with Saudi Arabia and the United Arab Emirates for influence in the Middle East and North Africa, including in Egypt, Libya and Tunisia. Qatari support for Islamist causes and for organizations that oppose the absolute rule of the Gulf's hereditary rulers provoked tensions with the GCC countries.

In March 2014, Saudi Arabia, the UAE, and Bahrain withdrew their ambassadors to Qatar for nine months; diplomatic relations were restored following the November 2014 Riyadh Agreement.

The officially cited reason for the 2014 diplomatic crisis was Qatar's alleged refusal to ratify the agreements of non-interference in domestic policy within the GCC in December 2013, but the underlying causes was a long-term degeneration in Qatar's relationships with other Arab states, precipitated by Qatari's backing of Islamists during Arab Spring revolts. Qatar and Turkey supported the Egyptian government of Mohammed Morsi of the Muslim Brotherhood, while the other Gulf Arab statements supported the military coup that ousted Morsi from power. As part of the 2014 agreement, Qatar expelled seven senior Muslim Brotherhood figures and agreed to stop al-Jazeera broadcasts critical of the Egyptian government. The 2014 agreement was vague and lacked verification provisions, however, and both sides later claimed that the other had breached the agreement.

On 5 June 2017, the Qatar diplomatic crisis began, with Saudi Arabia, Egypt, the UAE, and Bahrain severing diplomatic ties to Qatar and blockading Qatar, citing Qatar's support for the Muslim Brotherhood, its continued harboring of key Muslim Brotherhood figures within Qatar, and support for the International Union of Muslim Scholars, the Brotherhood's clerical affiliate, which is linked to Hamas. In January 2020, following a summit in Al-Ula, Saudi Arabia, Qatar reconciled with its neighbors, with a statement issued at the conclusion of the statement signed by Saudi Arabia, members of the Gulf Cooperation Council, and Egypt, although the statement did not specifically address the rift or its causes. In January 2021, Tamim signed an agreement ending the 43-month air, land and sea blockade of Qatar by Saudi Arabia, the United Arab Emirates, Bahrain and Egypt. The nations reopened their land border and airspace to Qatar.

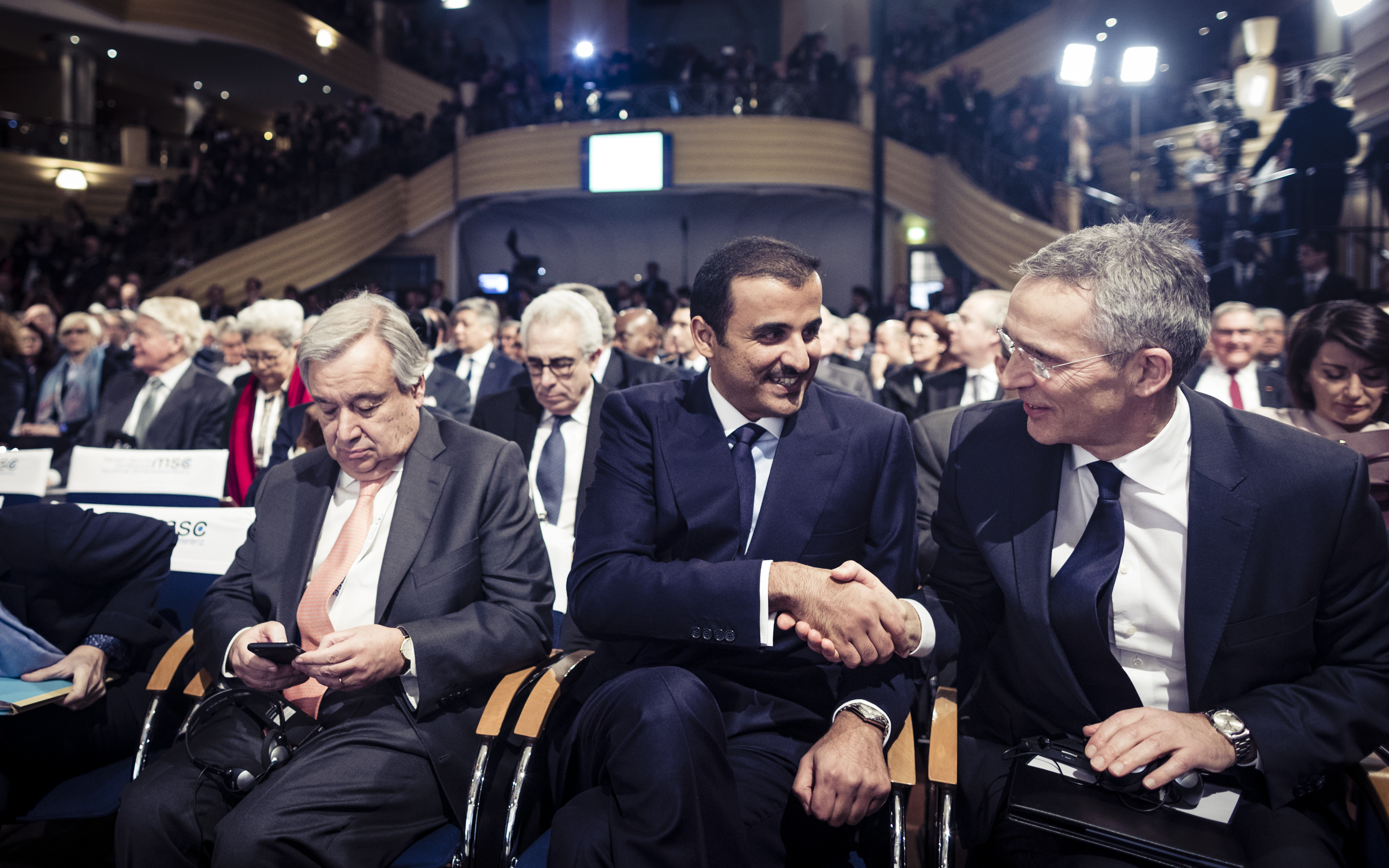
Sheikh Tamim, UN Secretary-General António Guterres and NATO Secretary General Jens Stoltenberg, 16 February 2018

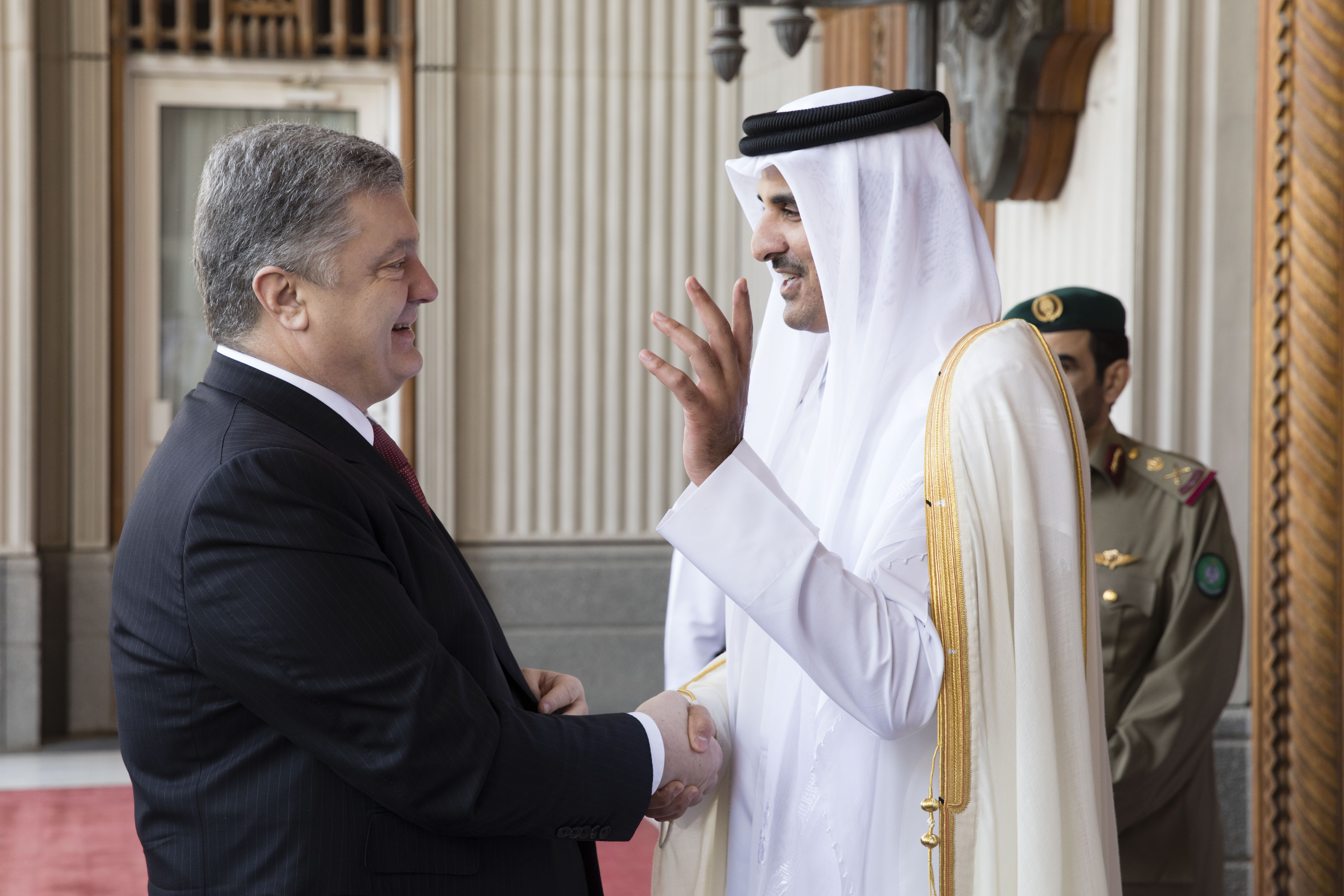
Sheikh Tamim bin Hamad Al Thani with Ukrainian President Petro Poroshenko in Qatar, 20 March 2018

===== Egypt =====
Qatar heavily invested in loans and aid to Egypt during the Muslim Brotherhood's government. According to documents obtained by Al Arabiya, Qatar had agreed to stop providing support to the Muslim Brotherhood. In August 2013, Qatar joined a U.S.-led attempt to mediate the escalating tension between the Muslim Brotherhood and the military. Speaking at Georgetown University during his first visit to the United States, Tamim reiterated that Qatar would not interfere in Egypt but condemned what happened in Egypt after the 2013 coup. Since Mohamed Morsi's removal from office, the new government has turned down Qatari offers for financial aid. Qatar's continued support for the Muslim Brotherhood resulted in a diplomatic rift between Qatar and Saudi Arabia, Bahrain and the UAE in 2014, culminating in the withdrawal of the latter three countries' ambassadors in March of that year. Qatar has continuously denied allegations of support for the Muslim Brotherhood, with the Foreign Minister stating in 2017: "In Egypt, when the Muslim Brotherhood assumed power, some linked this to Qatar's support, even though nearly 70 percent of the assistance program provided by Qatar was during the era of Essam Sharaf, during the period of the military council". In June 2016, Morsi was given a life sentence for passing state secrets to Qatar.

On 20 January 2021, Qatar and Egypt agreed to resume diplomatic relations. In March 2021, during a visit to Cairo, Qatari foreign minister Mohammed bin Abdulrahman bin Jassim Al Thani handed over Sheikh Tamim's invitation for Egypt's president Abdel Fattah el-Sisi. Sheikh Tamim named the Qatari ambassador to Egypt in July 2021 and met with el-Sisi in Baghdad on 28 August 2021. On 24 June 2022, Tamim met with el-Sisi in Cairo. They discussed diplomatic and economic relations after Qatar and Egypt had signed investments contracts worth more than US$5 billion in March 2022.

Qatar allegedly provided a financial boost to Morsi's Freedom and Justice Party, and Brotherhood opponents allegedly argued that Morsi's narrow election victory was achieved through Qatari funding. After Morsi's election, Qatar contributed a total of US$5.5 billion to the Muslim Brotherhood administration. Qatar has repeatedly denied that it supports the Muslim Brotherhood, saying it supports "the legitimate peoples and governments elected whatever the ideology of the ruling group as long as it works on the prosperity and welfare of its people." Tamim himself has also repeatedly denied that Qatar supports extremists.

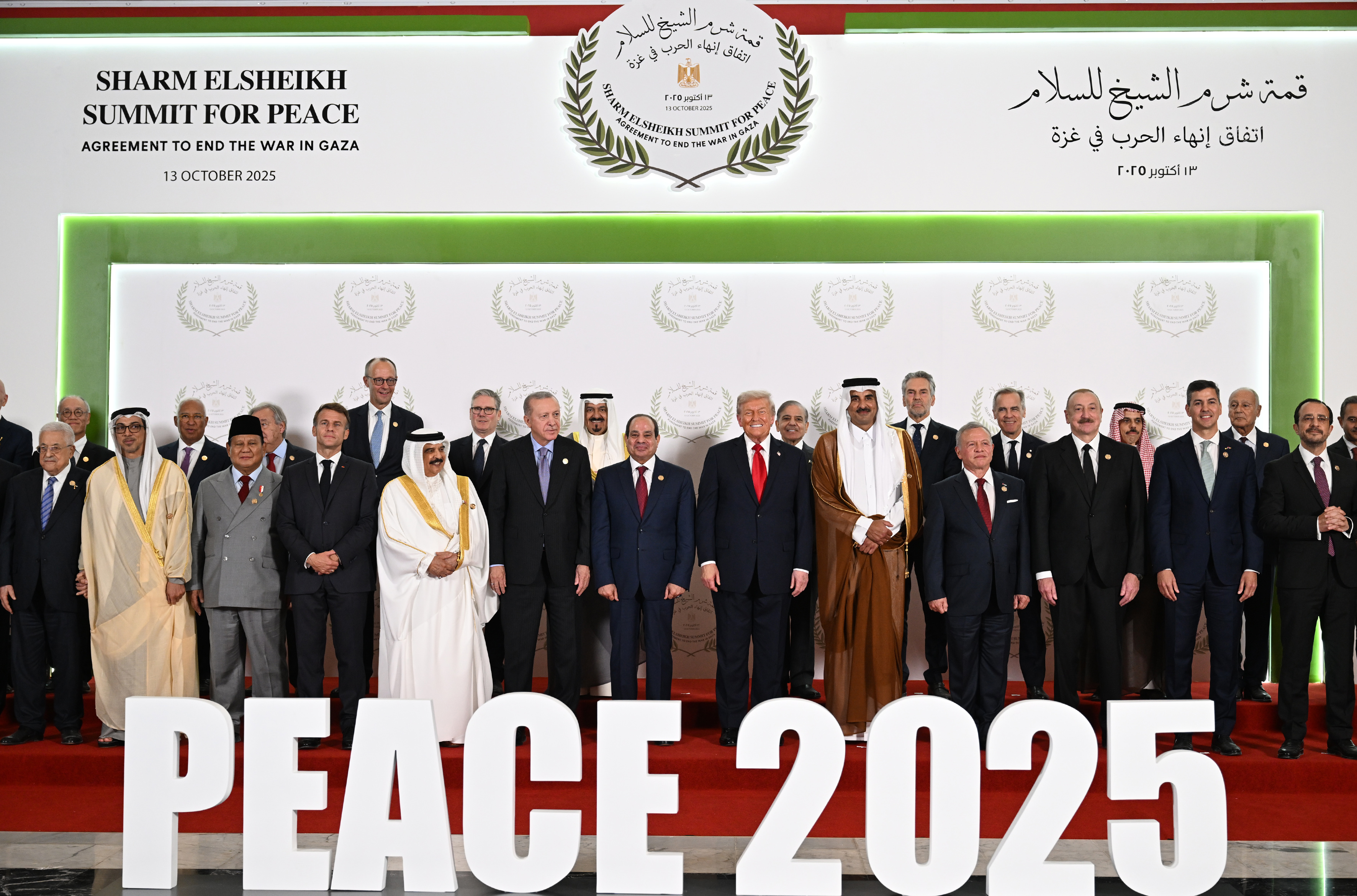
Sheikh Tamim with guests at the Gaza peace summit in Sharm El Sheikh, Egypt, 13 October 2025

Some countries and regional analysts have claimed that Qatar has supported a spectrum of Islamist groups around the region. Especially since the beginning of the Arab Spring in 2011, the country has provided diplomatic and medical initiatives, and warnings to Islamist groups. There have also been claims that the Qatar-based pan-Arab satellite television channel Al Jazeera promoted the narratives of the Islamist parties and causes supported by Qatar, thereby contributing to the electoral success of some of these movements during national polls. However, Al Jazeera maintains that it was under pressure because "it is the most transparent, balanced and unbiased of all Arab channels". The channel previously hosted a talk-show, "al-Sharīʿa wa al-Ḥayāh" ("Shariah and Life"), featuring the controversial Brotherhood-associated Egyptian cleric Yusuf al-Qaradawi.

On 1 November 2023, Qatar facilitated an agreement among Egypt, Israel, and Hamas. This agreement, in collaboration with the U.S., allowed for the safe evacuation of civilians from the besieged Gaza. In February 2024, Hamas proposed a deal with the mediation of Qatar and Egypt, aiming for the release of all Israeli hostages in Gaza and hundreds of Palestinians held in Israeli prisons, along with an end to the conflict. However, Israeli Prime Minister Netanyahu declined the proposal. Furthermore, the humanitarian actions of Emir Tamim Bin Hamad Al Thani and Mohammed bin Abdulrahman bin Jassim Al Thani received accolades from global leaders such as US Secretary Antony Blinken, Canadian prime minister Justin Trudeau, US President Joe Biden, and the EU's High Representative for Foreign Affairs Josep Borrell. On 23 May 2024, the U.S. official William J. Burns, the C.I.A. director leading American negotiation efforts for a Gaza cease-fire, plans to visit Europe for discussions with Israeli and Qatari and Egyptian leaders to reinvigorate talks on halting the conflict and releasing hostages.

===== Syria =====
Qatar called for a military intervention by Arab countries to end the bloodshed in Syria in 2012. Analysts expected that Tamim would have been under immediate pressure to reduce Qatar's support for the rebels in the Syrian Civil War, which he had previously supported. Sheikh Tamim took a step back after taking charge, primarily in response to the irritation voiced by Western powers at Qatar's operation to arm Syrian rebel groups which had been directed haphazardly. However, Qatar has continued to provide support to Syrian opposition groups, with Tamim declaring in a speech to the UN in September 2020 that Qatar would continue to support efforts to achieve justice and hold perpetrators of atrocities, war crimes, and crimes against humanity in Syria accountable. In 2015, under the aegis of a joint initiative with Saudi Arabia and Turkey promoted by Sheikh Tamim, Qatar has provided Syrian rebels with new weapons and forged a new opposition coalition in Syria known as the "Army of Conquest". Tamim also renewed his country's support for the Syrian people's demands for justice and freedom during a meeting with the chief of the Syrian National Coalition Khaled Khoja and his delegation in April 2015.

The Syrian rebel group Al-Rahman Legion was supported by Qatar in 2018. Since 2017, Qatari-backed Al-Rahman Legion has been fighting Saudi Arabian-backed Jaysh al-Islam rebel coalition.

On 7 May 2023, Sheikh Tamim unexpectedly left an Arab League summit before Syrian president Bashar al-Assad's scheduled speech. In September 2022, in an interview with the French news outlet Le Point, he highlighted that the factors that resulted in Syria's suspension from the Arab League in 2011 continue to be significant as the regime has been attributed to a prolonged period of conflict within the country, resulting significant refugee crisis on a global scale. According to various reports, the Assad regime has been accused of grave human rights violations such as employing distressing torture methods and shelling civilians.

Qatar and Western countries, such as the United States, the United Kingdom, and the United Nations, have expressed opposition to Bashar al-Assad's reinstatement into the Arab League. Their concerns primarily revolve around safeguarding the well-being and security of Syrian refugees across the Middle East. On 30 January 2025, Sheikh Tamim became the first head of state to visit Damascus since the fall of the Assad regime, discussing post-conflict reconstruction in Syria and other topics.

===== United Arab Emirates =====
In January 2019, a Reuters investigation revealed that a team of former US government intelligence operatives working on behalf of the United Arab Emirates had hacked the iPhones of activists, diplomats and foreign leaders, including Sheikh Tamim bin Hamad Al Thani. Beginning in 2016 the spying tool, code named 'K4RM4', enabled the UAE to monitor hundreds of individuals identified as potential critics of, or threats to, the Emirati government and its ideology. The hacking unit using the tool, known as 'Project Raven', was based in Abu Dhabi and composed of local security officials and former US intelligence operatives working for the UAE's intelligence services. Ex-Project Raven operatives described how Karma was able to remotely gain access to iPhones, including that of Sheikh Tamim's, by uploading numbers or email addresses into an automated targeting system. According to Reuters the phones of Sheikh Tamim's brother as well as several associates were also hacked by the Project Raven team.

===== Palestine =====
In November 2024, Sheikh Tamim bin Hamad Al Thani affirmed Qatar's support for a two-state solution to the Israeli-Palestinian conflict, advocating for the establishment of an independent Palestinian state based on the 1967 borders with East Jerusalem as its capital. His statement, emphasizing the importance of international resolutions and the Arab Peace Initiative, was delivered during the United Nations' "International Day of Solidarity with the Palestinian People" event in Vienna.

==== Russia ====
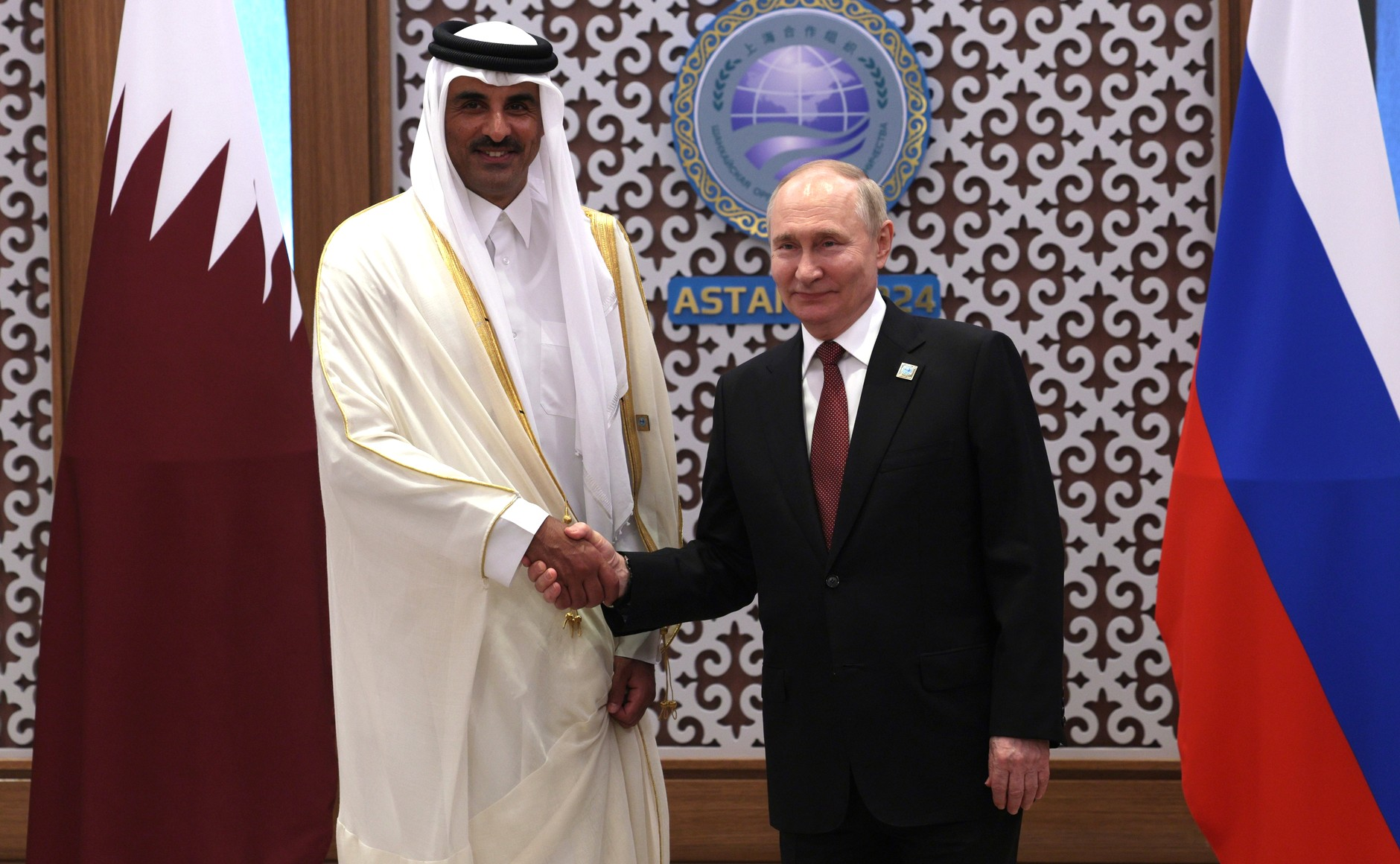
Tamim had a meeting with Russian President Vladimir Putin on the sidelines of the SCO summit in Astana, Kazakhstan, 4 July 2024

On 13 October 2022, Tamim met with Russian president Vladimir Putin in the capital of Kazakhstan, Astana. At the time, Putin was a political pariah over Russia's invasion of Ukraine. Tamim praised Putin, saying he was "proud" of the relationship between Qatar and Russia. Qatar acted as a mediator in negotiations between Russia and Ukraine.

==== Turkey ====
Tamim signed a military cooperation agreement with Turkey during an official visit to the country in December 2014. The agreement aims to promote cooperation in military training and the defense industry, and allows for the deployment of the Turkish Armed Forces to Qatar and the Qatari military to Turkey.

Donald Trump, Tamim bin Hamad Al Thani, and Recep Tayyip Erdoğan with other regional leaders at a multilateral meeting at the United Nations.

On 2 December 2015, Tamim signed a number of agreements with President Recep Tayyip Erdoğan. Cooperative agreements in education, maritime transport and correspondence pacts between intelligence agencies were signed. An agreement was also reached by Turkey to purchase liquefied natural gas from Qatar over a lengthy duration. The two leaders also announced the planned creation of a Turkish military base in Qatar; a first for Turkey in the Persian Gulf.

In August 2018, Qatar pledged $15 billion investment in Turkey, during currency crisis amid a diplomatic standoff with US. The investment package was announced after Tamim met Erdoğan in Ankara, on 15 August 2018.

On 6 December 2021, Tamim received Erdoğan for a state visit in Doha. During the two-day visit, they signed 15 agreements regarding culture, economy, defense and security. In addition, several memoranda of understanding were signed between the countries' ministries. Tamim and Erdoğan also agreed to extend the $15 billion currency swap agreement between Qatar and Turkey.

On 4 December 2023, Erdoğan and Tamim chaired the 9th meeting of the Turkey-Qatar Supreme Strategic Committee; and signed 12 cooperation agreements in various fields.

==== United Kingdom ====
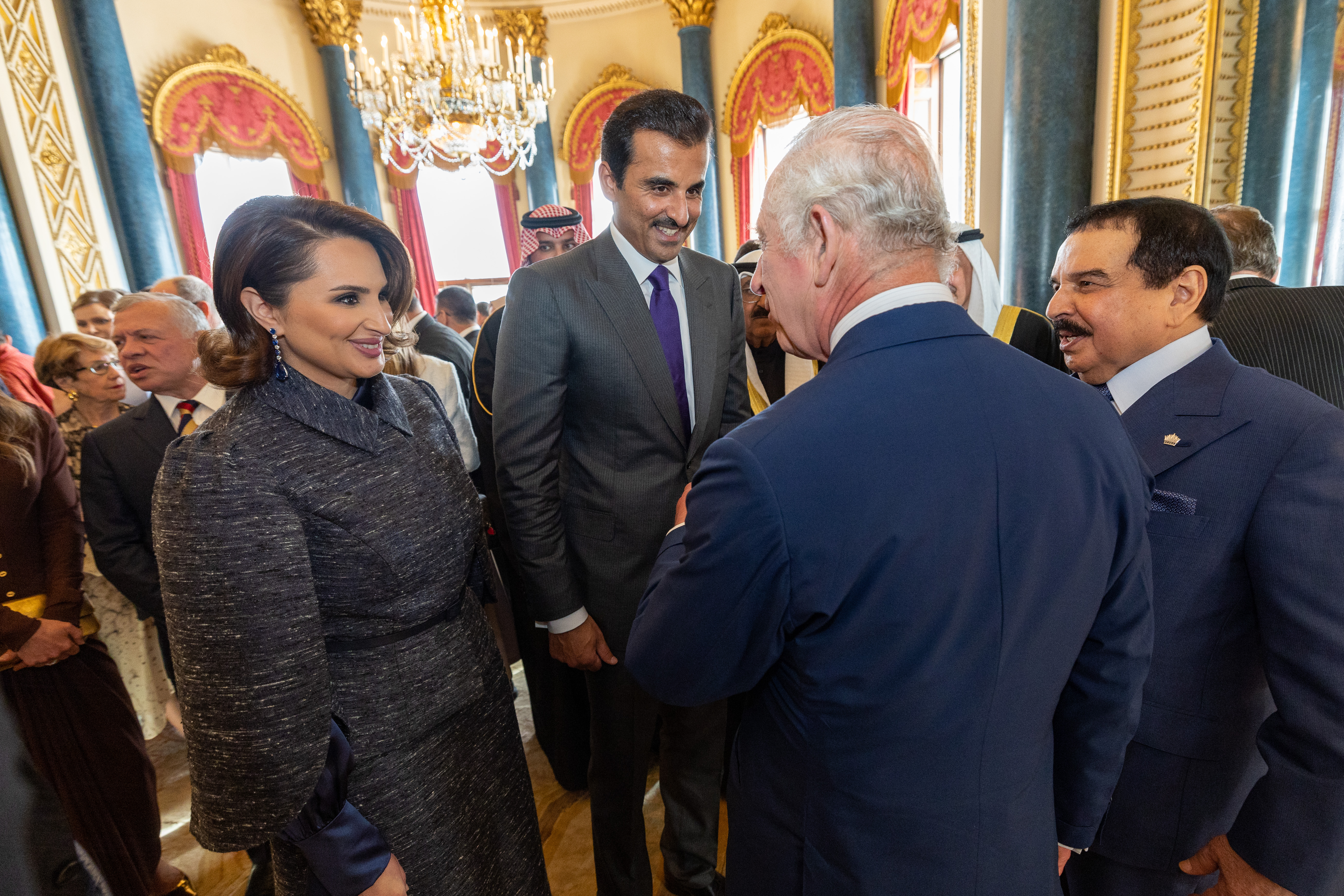
Tamim and his wife Sheikha Jawaher at a reception for the coronation of Charles III in 2023

Tamim met UK prime minister David Cameron and Queen Elizabeth II in October 2014 on his first official visit to the UK. Qatar and the UK anticipated a Qatari-British Economic Forum to explore mutual investment opportunities. Up to and during this meeting The Telegraph newspaper launched a campaign to urge Cameron to discuss Qatar's funding of Islamic extremists with Tamim. The Conservative MP, Stephen Barclay, repeatedly called for transparency in Britain's dealings with Qatar and said it was "essential" for Cameron to raise the issue of terror finance. "I welcome the fact that the Prime Minister is meeting with the Emir," he said. "As part of these discussions it is essential that the issue of financing Sunni tribes in Syria and Iraq is raised."

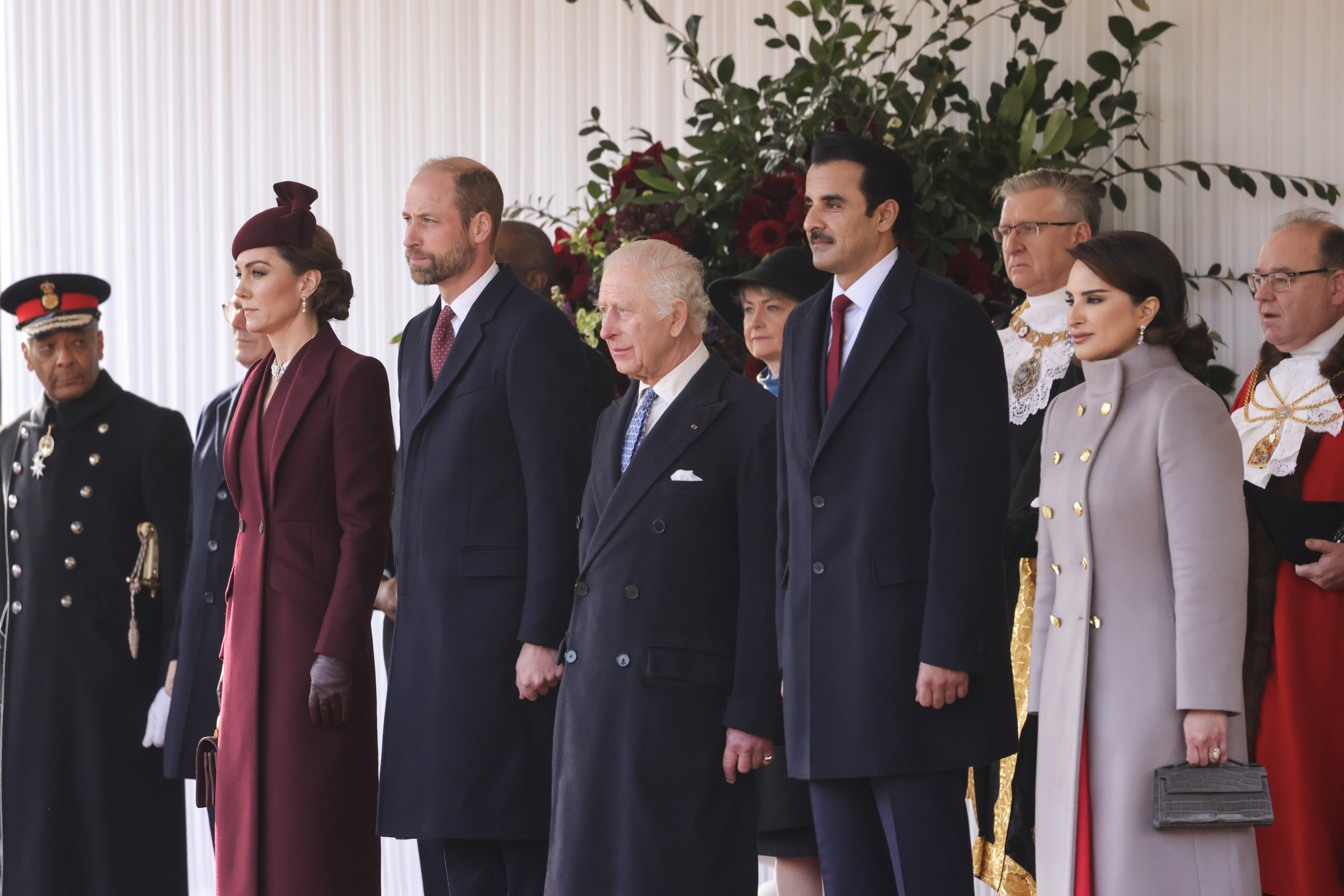
Tamim and King Charles III during the Emir's state visit to the UK, December 2024

In July 2018, Tamim and UK prime minister Theresa May signed a letter of intent between the governments of Qatar and the United Kingdom. Both agreed to exchange information and intelligence on terrorism, to cooperate in the areas of law enforcement related to terror activities and security of the transport sector, including airports and aviation, and to fight financial crime.

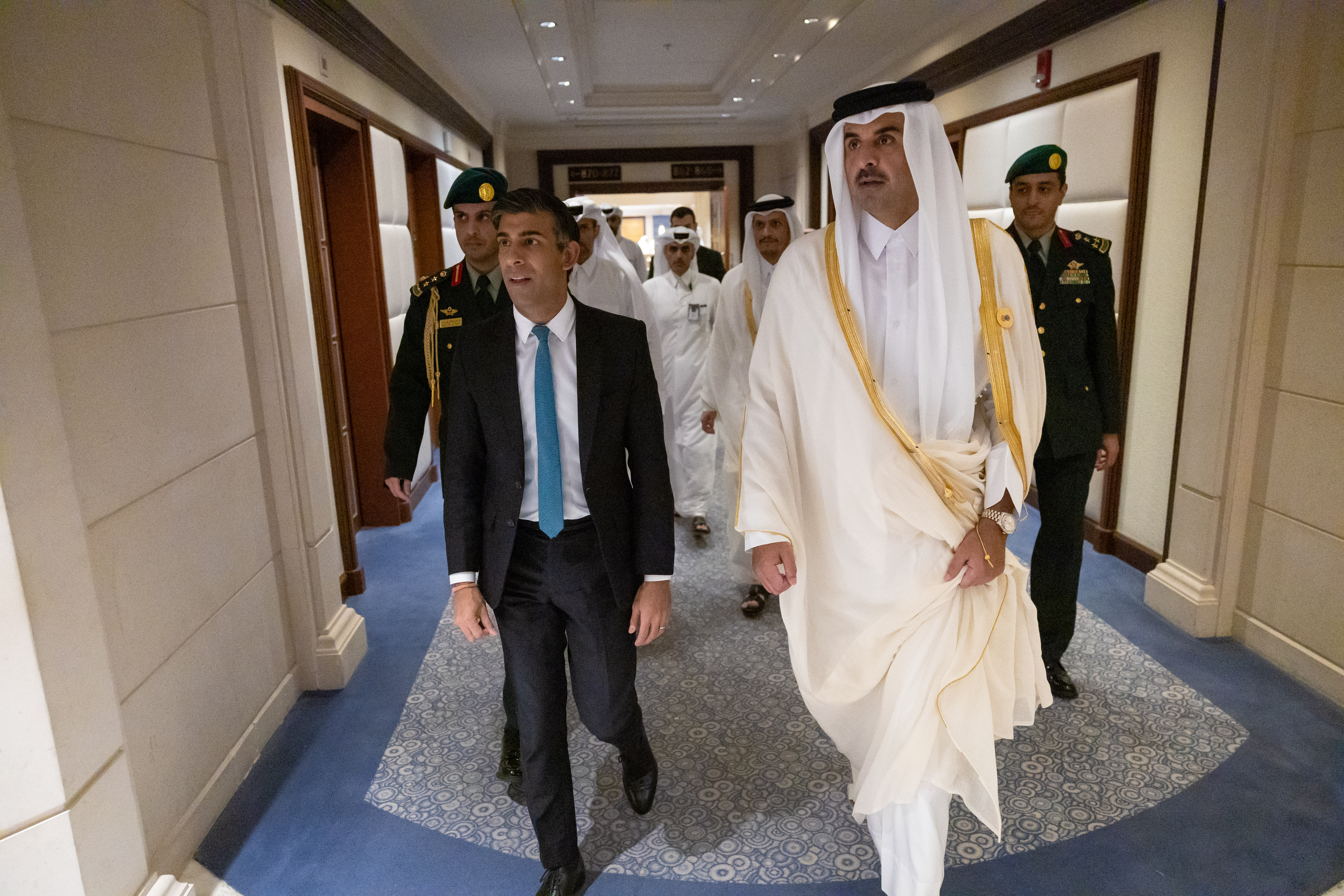
Tamim with British Prime Minister Rishi Sunak, 20 October 2023

Sheikh Tamim and Sheikha Jawaher bint Hamad Al Thani attended the state funeral of Queen Elizabeth II on 19 September 2022, and the coronation of King Charles III on 6 May 2023, both held in Westminster Abbey, London.

King Charles III and Queen Camilla hosted Tamim at Buckingham Palace for a state visit on 3 and 4 December 2024. This followed their most recent meeting at the COP28 climate summit in Dubai in December 2023.

==== Europe ====
Tamim met French president François Hollande twice in 2014 and 2015. In the latter meeting, they signed an agreement for the sale of Rafale jets to Qatar.

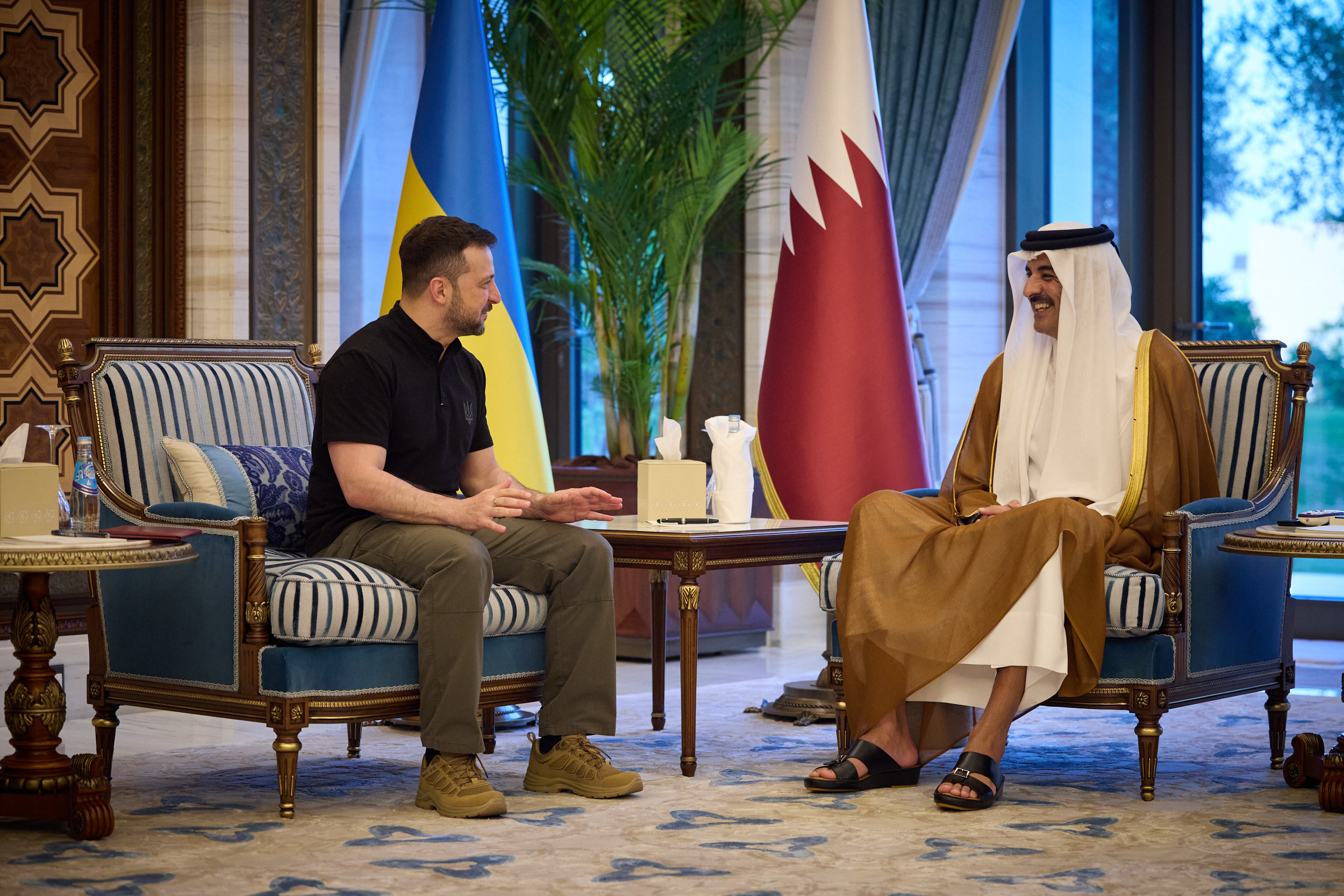
Tamim with Ukrainian President Volodymyr Zelenskyy, 5 June 2024

Tamim met French president Emmanuel Macron twice in 2017. In the latter meeting, they signed commercial contracts worth more than US$14 billion. During their 2018 meeting, Tamim thanked Macron for his support for Qatar in the Gulf crisis. They met again in 2021. In 2024, Macron and Tamim signed a €10 billion agreement on investment in the French economy.

In May 2022, during his first visit to Europe after the Russian invasion of Ukraine, Tamim signed energy and investment projects with several countries, including Spain and Germany, and for the first time spoke at the World Economic Forum annual meeting in Davos.

In March 2024, Qatar facilitated negotiations between Russia and Ukraine on reuniting children with their families who were separated during the conflict. Russia returned six children to Ukraine with the assistance of Qatari mediators in May 2024. In June, President of Ukraine Volodymyr Zelenskyy visited Qatar and met with Tamim. Zelenskyy expressed gratitude for Qatar's assistance in the return of Ukrainian children. Zelenskyy also highlighted the importance of Qatar's support for Ukraine's Peace Formula, which was held in 15 and 16 June.

==== United States ====
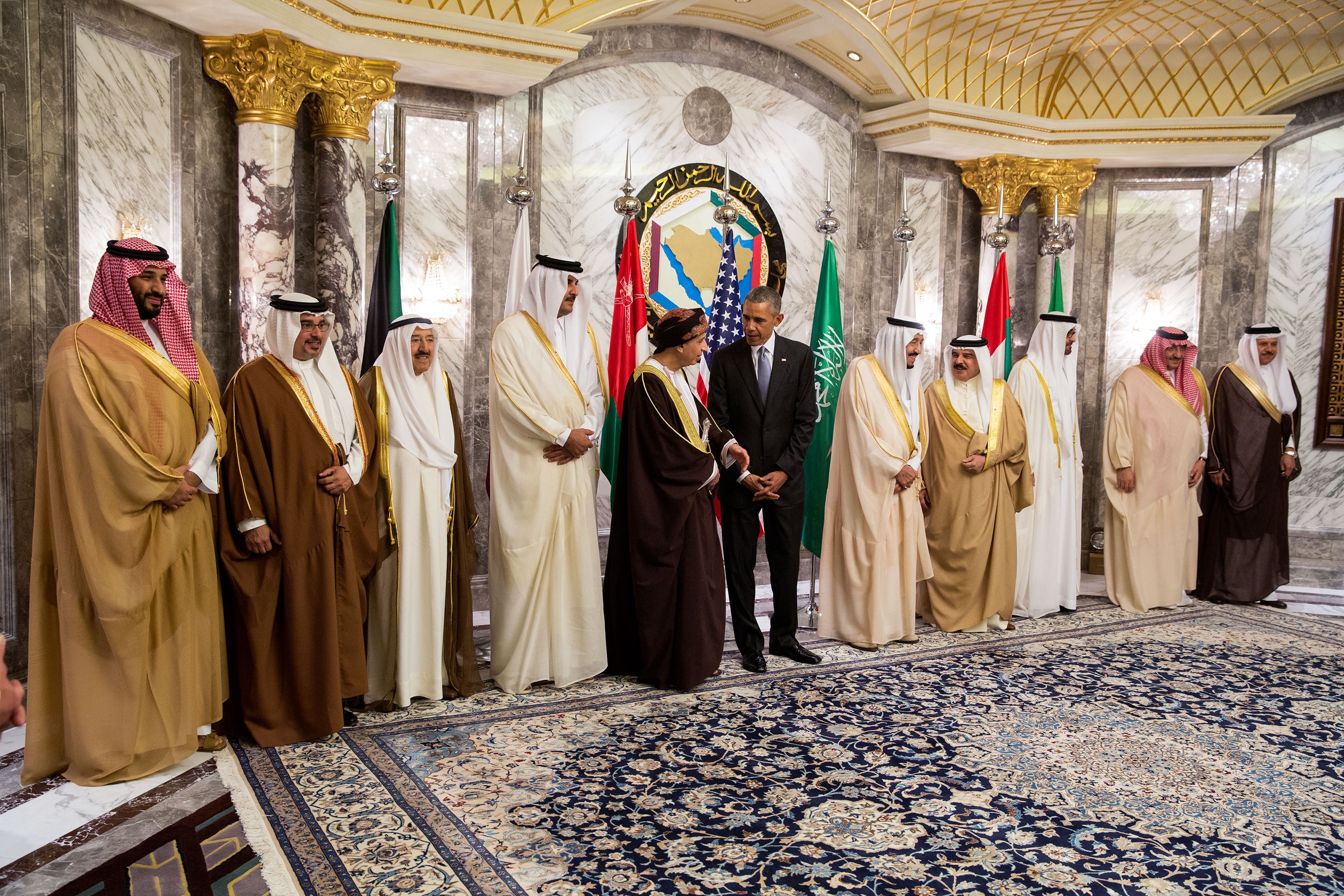
President Barack Obama and Tamim at the GCC summit in Saudi Arabia, 21 April 2016

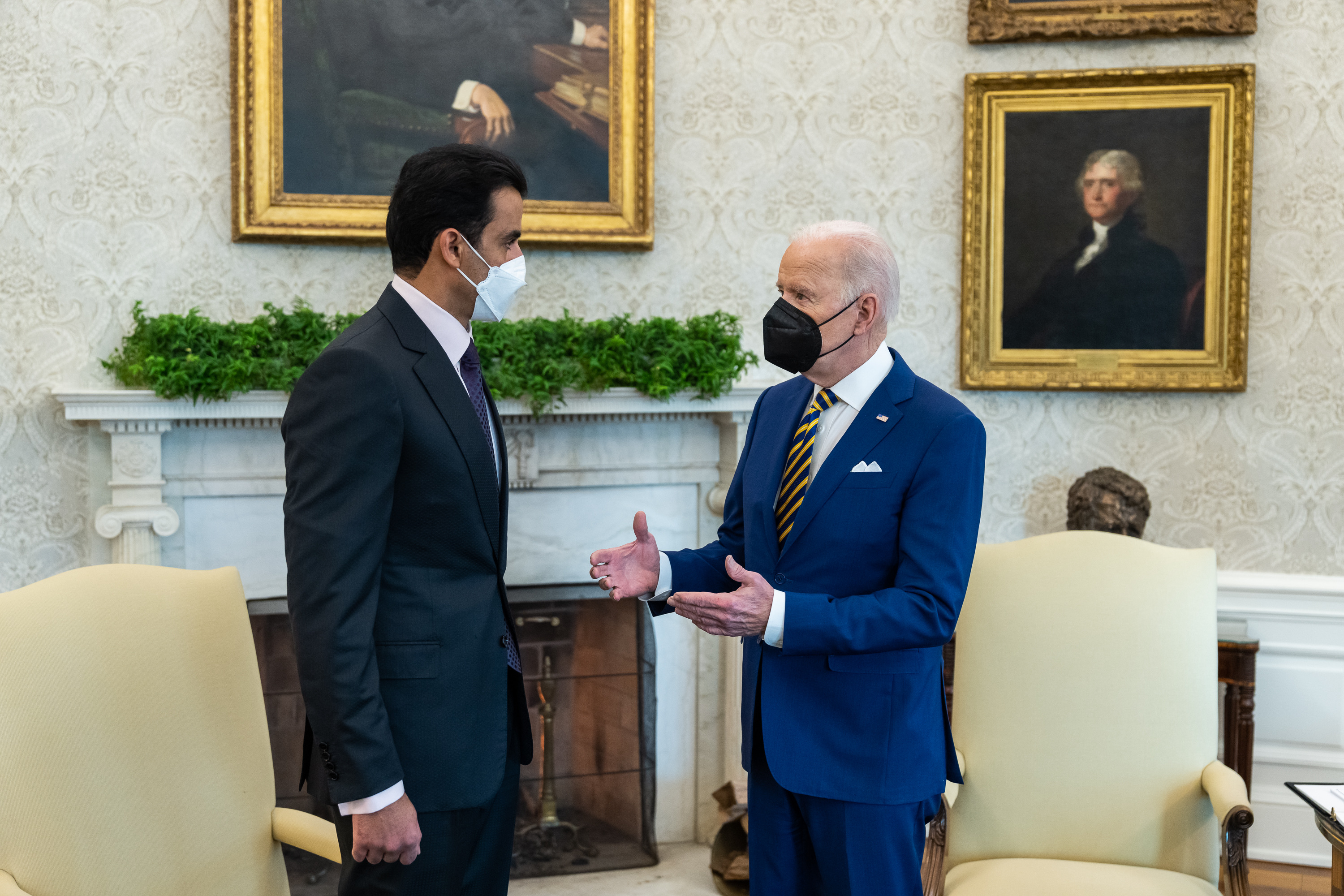
Sheikh Tamim meets with President Joe Biden, 31 January 2022

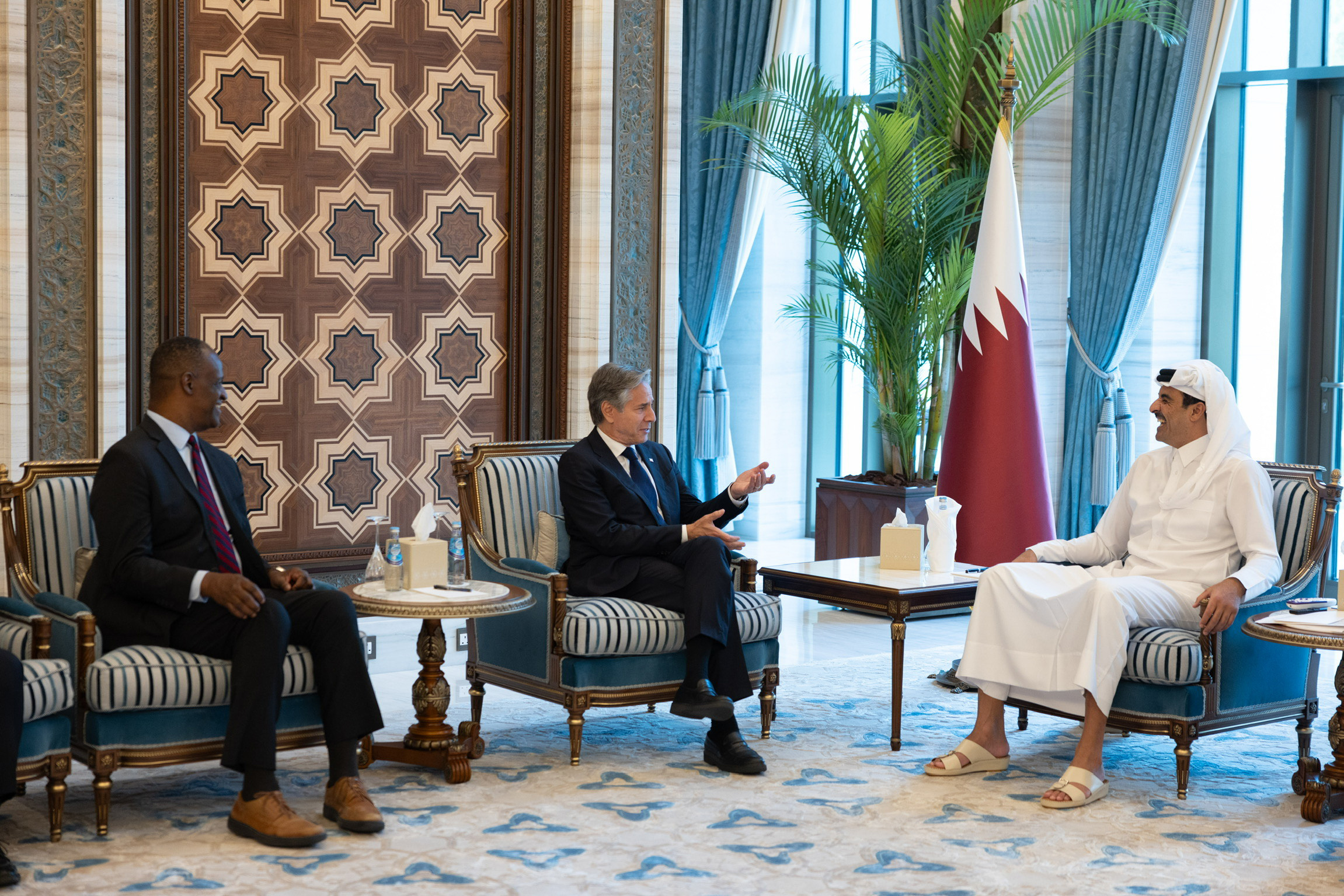
Sheikh Tamim meets with US Secretary of State Antony Blinken, 12 June 2024

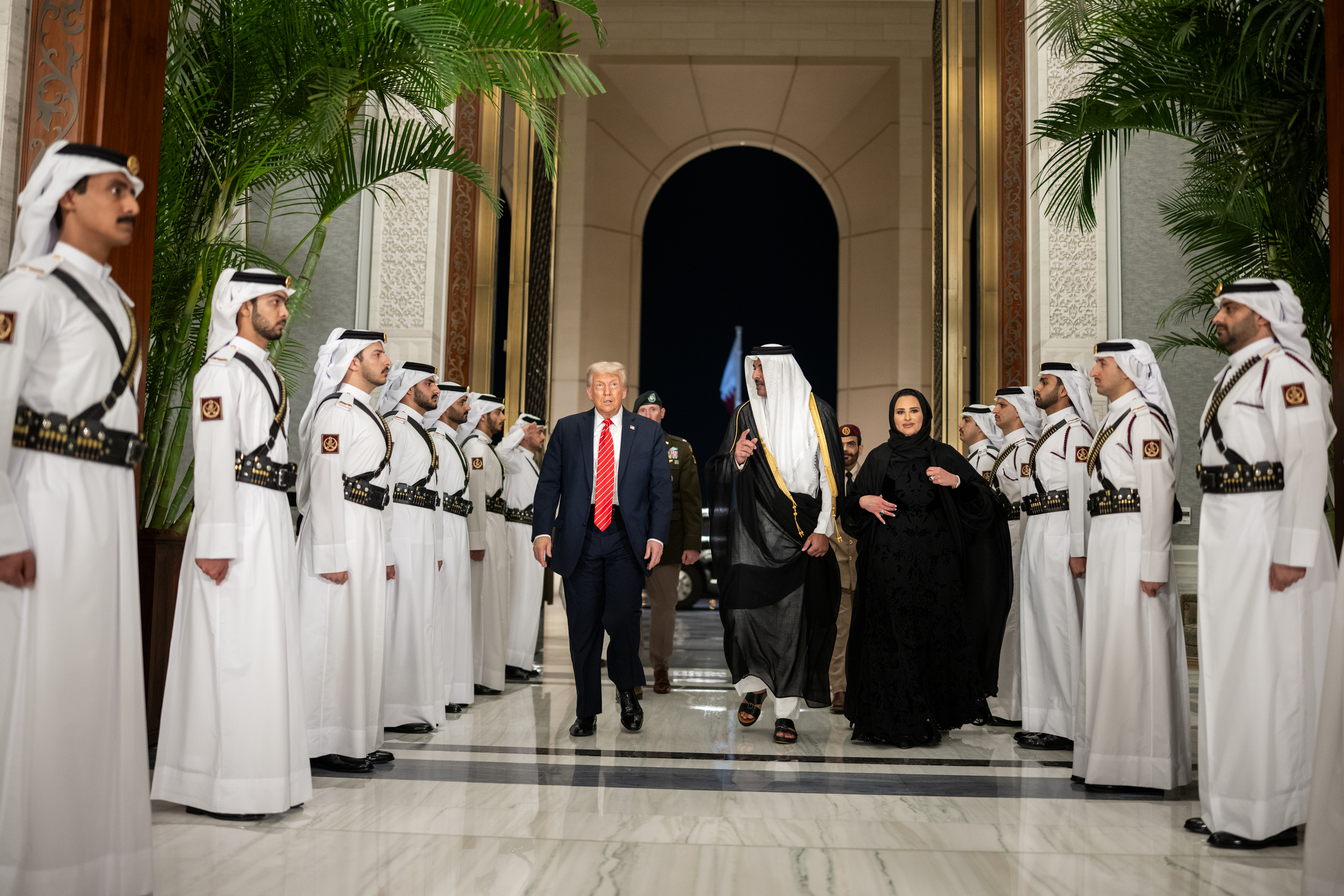
Sheikh Tamim and Sheikha Jawaher with President Donald Trump, in Lusail Palace 14 May 2025

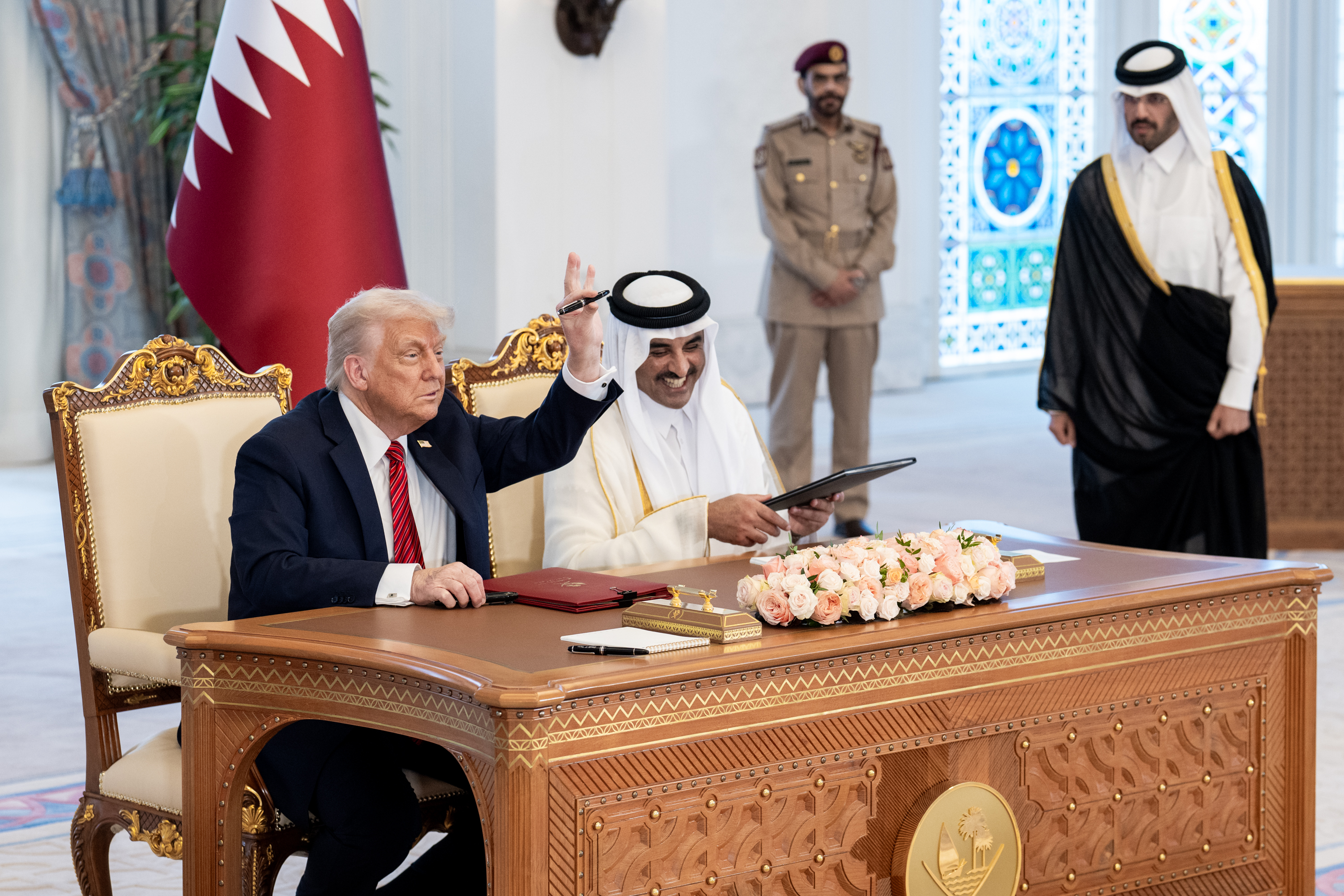
Sheikh Tamim with President Donald Trump, 14 May 2025

In July 2014, Tamim renewed the defence agreement with the U.S. and confirmed Qatar's cooperation with the U.S. in the Combined Air Operations Center at Al Udeid Air Base.

After visiting U.S. President Barack Obama at the White House in February 2015, Tamim wrote an editorial saying the U.S.–Qatari "strategic partnership has deepened in recent years, in spite of the regional unrest" and reiterated his commitment to support a more comprehensive approach to the strategic challenges facing the Middle East.

Sheikh Tamim was a personal friend of U.S. President Donald Trump prior to the latter's presidency. He visited the United States several times during Trump's presidency and has held bilateral meetings at the White House in Washington, D.C.

Tamim in particular played a role in the mediation with Taliban leaders, with whom he initiated contacts under his father's government. The United States requested the establishment of a Taliban office in Doha. In June 2013, the Taliban opened their first official overseas office in the Qatari capital as part of the long-standing attempt to broker a long-term Afghan peace agreement. In June 2015, Qatar successfully mediated efforts to free four Tajikistan soldiers kidnapped in December 2014 in Afghanistan by a Taliban group.

In July 2017, the US and Qatar signed a memorandum of understanding to combat the financing of terrorism. In the same year, U.S. secretary of state Rex Tillerson said that "The emir of Qatar has made progress in halting financial support and expelling terrorist elements from his country".

In July 2019, Sheikh Tamim visited the U.S. to meet President Donald Trump, who attended a dinner with him hosted by Treasury Secretary Steve Mnuchin and attended by Robert Kraft, Christine Lagarde, and others.

On an August 2021 telephone conversation, U.S. President Joe Biden thanked Tamim for Qatar's support regarding the US evacuations from Afghanistan, which according to Biden, the airlifts "would not have been possible without the early support from Qatar". Sheikh Tamim visited Biden at the White House on a visit to Washington, D.C., on 31 January 2022. He was the first leader from the Gulf Cooperation Council to visit the White House since Biden took office. They discussed bilateral relations, stability of global energy supplies, the situation in Afghanistan, and peace in the Middle East. Biden called Qatar a "good friend and reliable and capable partner", and announced the designation of Qatar as a major non-NATO ally.

Qatar hosted the historic signing of a peace deal between the US and the Taliban in February 2020 which called for the full withdrawal of US troops from Afghanistan. Beginning in September 2020, Qatar has hosted the peace talks between the Afghan government and the Taliban to end decades of war in the country.

Qatar mediated a deal between the United States and Iran, which saw the release of five prisoners in each country and the unfreezing of US$6 billion of Iranian funds in September 2023, which had been frozen due to sanctions imposed by the United States. U.S. President Biden thanked Tamim and Qatari officials for their role in the mediation as well as establishing a "Humanitarian channel" for Iran.

==== Israel ====
In 1996, Qatar established trade relations with Israel, the first amongst all nations of the Arabian Peninsula and has continued to maintain its "working relationship" with Israel. Qatar cut commercial ties with Israel in 2009, after the first of four wars between Israel and Hamas in Gaza (Gaza War (2008–2009), 2012 Gaza War, 2014 Gaza War, 2021 Gaza War). In 2021, Qatar abstained from entering diplomatic agreement with Israel brokered by the United States, the country only maintained "working relationship" in order to aid Palestinians. It stated that it would normalize diplomatic ties when Israel commits to the Arab Peace Initiative. In May 2021, it was reported that Qatar had within a period of 10 years provided over $3 billion in aid to Gaza and West Bank with Israeli approval. In 2022, Israeli military officials were secretly dispatched to Qatar's Al Udeid Air Base, forward operating headquarters of all US forces in the West Asia, also known as CENTCOM as part of a security reshuffle.

The Gaza war disturbed large parts of the world – even countries in the Arab world that had good contacts with Israel and were on the path to rapprochement with Israel, such as Qatar. Tamim stressed that his country, in which Hamas had a representative for years, blamed the Israeli government alone for the lack of success of the ceasefire and hostage negotiations and stated that the Israeli government was not a partner for peace: "We are currently not experiencing a peace process, but a genocide."

== Personal characteristics and views ==
Sheikh Tamim is described as friendly, confident, and open by those who know him. He is also described as savvy, careful, and conservative. In addition, he is considered to be a pragmatist, and to have "excellent relations" with the West, including the United States and France.

Political analysts expected Tamim to be more conservative and risk-averse than his father. Because Tamim is very close to the Muslim Brotherhood, preserving a national identity grounded in Islamic traditional values has been Tamim's first priority.

A sketch of Tamim entitled Tamim al-Majd (Tamim the Glorious) by advertiser Ahmed al-Maadheed became extremely popular as a nationalistic symbol in Qatar following the beginning of the 2017 Qatar diplomatic crisis.

== Personal life ==
- Sheikh Tamim married his first wife and second cousin, Sheikha Jawaher bint Hamad Al Thani, on 8 January 2005. They have four children, two sons and two daughters:
  - Sheikha Al Mayassa bint Tamim bin Hamad Al Thani (born 15 January 2006)
  - Sheikh Hamad bin Tamim bin Hamad Al Thani (born 20 October 2008)
  - Sheikha Aisha bint Tamim bin Hamad Al Thani (born 24 August 2010)
  - Sheikh Jassim bin Tamim bin Hamad Al Thani (born 12 June 2012)
- Sheikh Tamim married a second wife, Sheikha Al-Anoud bint Mana Al Hajri, on 3 March 2009. She is the daughter of Mana bin Abdul Hadi Al Hajri, former Qatari Ambassador to Jordan. They have five children, three daughters and two sons:
  - Sheikha Naylah bint Tamim bin Hamad Al Thani (born 27 May 2010)
  - Sheikh Abdullah bin Tamim bin Hamad Al Thani (born 29 September 2012)
  - Sheikha Rodha bint Tamim bin Hamad Al Thani (born January 2014)
  - Sheikh Alqaqa'a bin Tamim bin Hamad Al Thani (born 3 October 2015)
  - Sheikha Moza bint Tamim bin Hamad Al Thani (born 19 May 2018)
- On 25 February 2014, Sheikh Tamim married a third wife, Sheikha Noora bint Hathal Al Dosari. They have four children, three sons and one daughter:
  - Sheikh Joa'an bin Tamim bin Hamad Al Thani (born 27 March 2015)
  - Sheikh Mohammed bin Tamim bin Hamad Al Thani (born 17 July 2017)
  - Sheikh Fahad bin Tamim bin Hamad Al Thani (born 16 June 2018)
  - Sheikha Hind bint Tamim bin Hamad Al Thani (born 5 February 2020)

In total he has thirteen children born between 2006 and 2020; seven sons and six daughters, from three wives.

Tamim participates in competitive sport. He was a tennis player who won the GCC Tennis Championship for Juniors under 16, hosted by Qatar in 1993. He has been filmed playing badminton and bowling with former Egyptian military chief Mohamed Hussein Tantawi. He has a strong interest in history and his nation's heritage. He is fluent in Arabic, English and French.

== Succession ==
The present constitution of Qatar, established in 2005, dictates that the rule is hereditary and limited to descendants of Hamad bin Khalifa Al Thani. The order of succession in Qatar is determined by appointments within the House of Al Thani.

On 11 November 2014, Emir Tamim appointed his younger half-brother Abdullah bin Hamad Al Thani to the post of Deputy Emir, making him de facto heir presumptive to the throne of Qatar. Emir Tamim is one day expected to appoint one of his own sons as crown prince.

== Honours ==
=== National ===
- Qatar
  - Grand Master of the Order of Independence (25 June 2013)
  - Grand Master of the Order of Merit (25 June 2013; Collar 5 August 2003)

=== Foreign ===
- Bahrain
  - Member Exceptional Class of the Order of Sheikh Isa bin Salman Al Khalifa (23 February 2004)
- Brazil
  - Grand Collar of the Order of the Southern Cross (12 November 2021)
- Chad
  - Grand Cross of the National Order of Chad (13 August 2022)
- Croatia
  - Grand Cross of the Grand Order of King Tomislav (23 April 2017)
- Ecuador
  - Grand Collar of the National Order of Merit (30 October 2018)
- France
  - Grand Cross of the Order of the Legion of Honour (27 February 2024)
  - Grand Officer of the Order of the Legion of Honour (4 February 2010)
- Italy
  - Knight Grand Cross with Collar of the Order of Merit of the Italian Republic (16 October 2024)
  - Knight Grand Cross of the Order of Merit of the Italian Republic (16 November 2007)
- Jordan
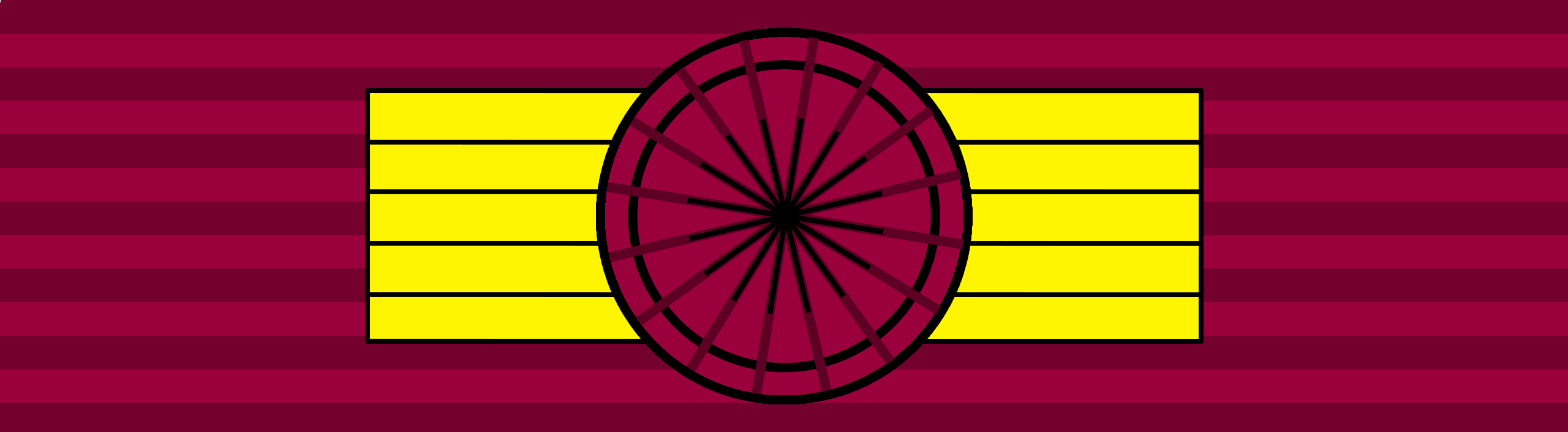
  - Collar of the Order of Al-Hussein bin Ali (17 September 2025)
- Kazakhstan
  - Collar of the Order of the Golden Eagle (12 October 2022)
- Kuwait
  - Collar of the Order of Mubarak the Great (28 October 2013)
- Oman
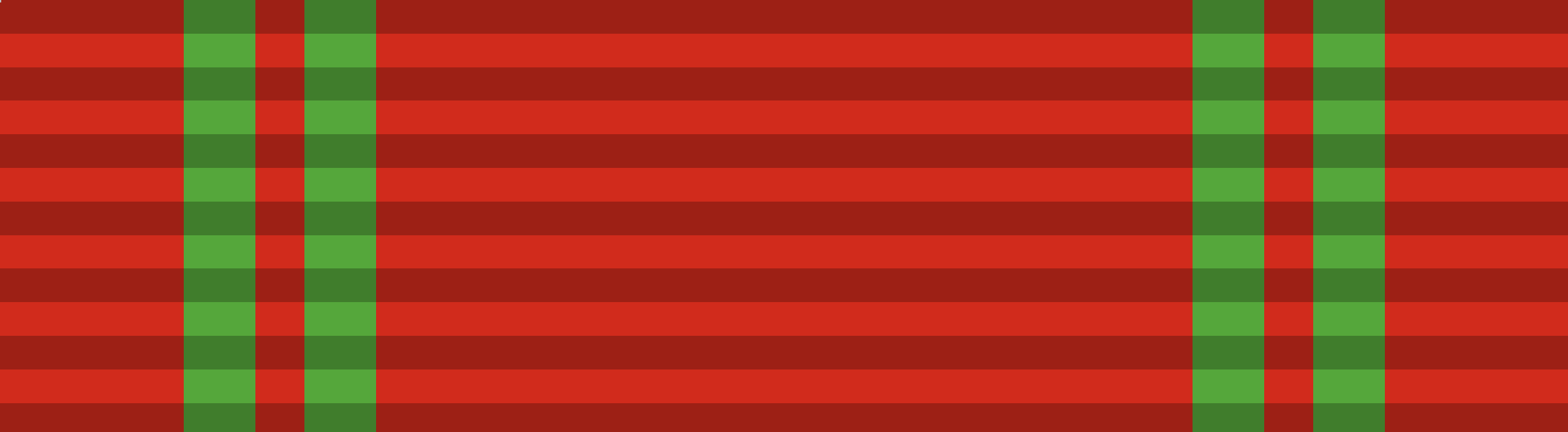
  - Member 1st Class (Civil division) of the Order of Oman (22 November 2021)
- Pakistan
  - Recipient of the Nishan-e-Pakistan (23 June 2019)
- Peru
  - Grand Collar of the Order of the Sun of Peru (13 February 2014)
- Poland
  - Knight of the Order of the White Eagle (5 July 2024)
- Singapore
  - Member 1st Class of the Order of Nila Utama (16 March 2009)
- Spain
  - Knight of the Collar of the Royal Order of Isabella the Catholic (10 May 2022)
- Sudan
  - Collar of Honour (2 April 2014)
- Tunisia
  - Grand Cordon of the Order of the Republic (3 April 2014)
- United Arab Emirates
  - Collar of the Order of Zayed (6 January 2005)
- United Kingdom
  - Honorary Knight Grand Cross of the Most Honourable Order of the Bath (GCB, 3 December 2024)

=== Awards ===
- Egypt
  - Al-Ahram Newspaper: "Best Sports Personality in the Arab World" – 2006
- International Olympic Committee
  - Olympic Council of Asia: Recipient of the "OCA Award of Merit" – 2007

Tamim bin Hamad Al Thani House of Thani Born: 3 June 1980
Regnal titles
| Preceded by Hamad bin Khalifa Al Thani | Emir of Qatar; 2013–present | Incumbent; Deputy Emir: Abdullah bin Hamad Al Thani |
