= Abdullah bin Hamad Al Thani =

Qatari royal and politician (born 1988)

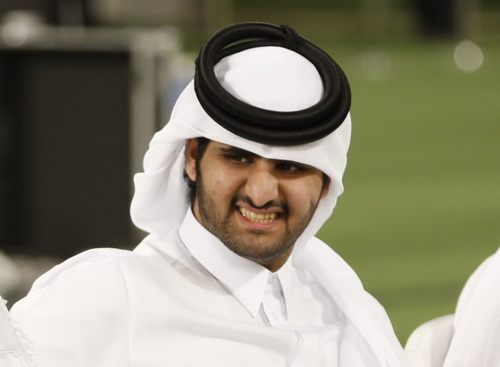

Deputy Emir of Qatar
- In office: 11 November 2014 – present
- Monarch: Tamim bin Hamad Al Thani
- Born: 9 February 1988 (age 38); Doha, Qatar
- Spouse: Al Maha bint Muhammad Al Attiyah (m. 2012)
- Issue: Sheikh Hamad bin Abdullah Al Thani; Sheikh Tamim bin Abdullah Al Thani
- House: Thani
- Father: Hamad bin Khalifa Al Thani
- Mother: Noora bint Khalid Al Thani

Abdullah bin Hamad bin Khalifa Al Thani (Arabic: عبد الله بن حمد آل ثاني; born 9 February 1988 in Doha) is the Deputy Emir of Qatar and unofficial heir presumptive to the Emir of Qatar. Prior to his appointment as Deputy Emir he was chief of the Amiri Diwan of the State of Qatar.

== Early life and education ==
Abdullah bin Hamad Al Thani was born in Doha, Qatar, on 9 February 1988, as the son of the future Emir of Qatar Hamad bin Khalifa Al Thani and Sheikha Noora bint Khalid Al Thani, his third wife. He graduated with a Bachelor of Science in Foreign Service from Georgetown University in 2010.

From 20 December 2011 to 10 November 2014, Abdullah was the chief of the Amiri Diwan of the State of Qatar. On 11 November 2014, Emir Tamim bin Hamad Al Thani appointed his younger half-brother Abdullah to the post of Deputy Emir, unofficially making him heir to the throne of Qatar. Emir Tamim is one day expected to appoint one of his own sons as crown prince.

== Positions ==
Since 4 November 2018, Abdullah has been the Chairman of the Board of Trustees of QatarEnergy. Sheikh Abdullah bin Hamad is the Chairman of Board of Regents of Qatar University. Abdullah is the Vice-chairman of the Supreme Council for Economic Affairs and Investment.

== Personal life ==
Abdullah married Sheikha Al Maha bint Muhammad Al Attiyah at Al Wajbah Palace on 22 March 2012. Sheikha Al Maha has a degree from the Qatar University College of Engineering and Computer Science. She is the daughter of Sheikh Muhammad bin Abdullah bin Hamad Al Attiyah, Premier and Chairman of the Administrative Control and Transparency Authority. He can speak Arabic and English.
