= Deputy Emir of Qatar =

Heir apparent to the Emir of Qatar

Deputy Emir of the State of Qatar
- نائب دولة قطر; Nayib Dawlat Qatar

Incumbent
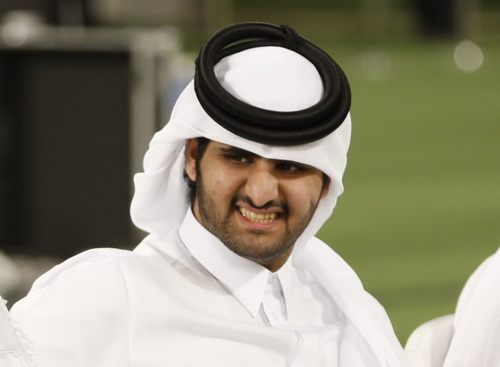
- Abdullah bin Hamad Al Thani since 11 November 2014

Details
- Style: His Highness
- First monarch: Mohammed bin Thani
- Formation: 1851

The deputy emir of the State of Qatar (Arabic: نائب دولة قطر) is the heir presumptive to the emir of Qatar.

The Constitution of Qatar published in 2005 dictates that the rule is hereditary and limited to descendants of Hamad bin Khalifa Al Thani. The order of succession in Qatar is determined by appointments within the House of Al Thani.

They are members of the House of Al Thani, whose origins are in the Banu Tamim, one of the largest tribes in the Arabian Peninsula. The present ruler is Tamim bin Hamad Al Thani, who succeeded on 25 June 2013.

On 11 November 2014, Tamim bin Hamad Al Thani appointed his half brother Abdullah to the post of deputy emir, unofficially making him heir to the throne of Qatar. Emir Tamim is one day expected to appoint one of his own sons as crown prince.

== See also ==
- Politics of Qatar
  - Emir of Qatar
  - Prime Minister of Qatar
- House of Thani
