= Al-Anoud bint Mana Al Hajri =

Qatari royal

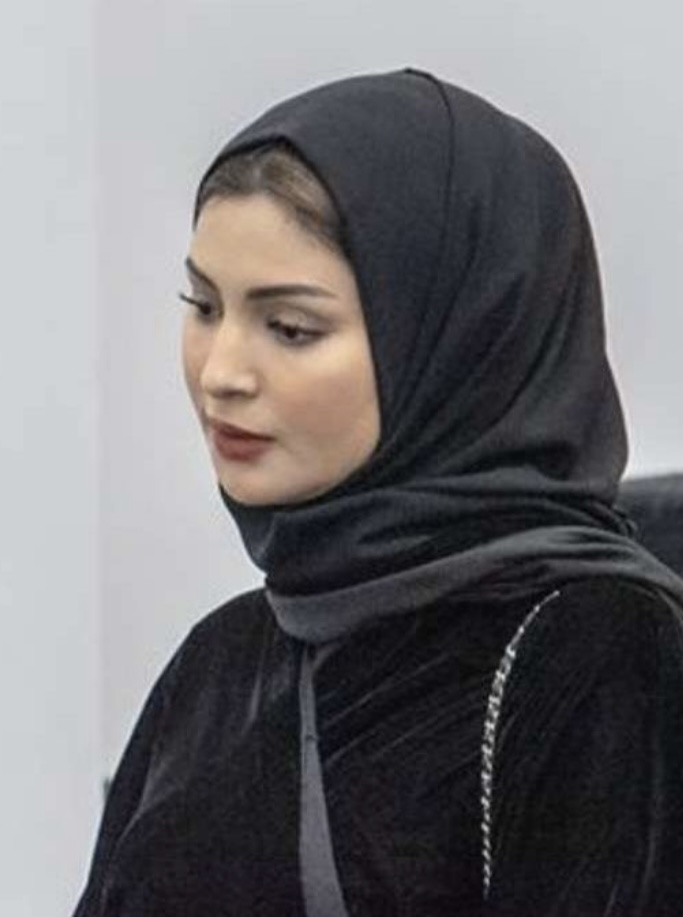
- Al-Anoud in 2022

Consort to the Emir of Qatar
- Tenure: 25 June 2013 – present
- Born: Qatar
- Spouse: Tamim bin Hamad Al Thani (m. 2009)
- Issue: Sheikha Naylah bint Tamim Al Thani; Sheikh Abdullah bin Tamim Al Thani; Sheikha Rodha bint Tamim Al Thani; Sheikh Alqaqa'a bin Tamim Al Thani; Sheikha Moza bint Tamim Al Thani
Names
- Al-Anoud bint Mana Abdul Al-Hadi Al-Hajri
- House: Thani (by marriage)
- Father: Mana bin Abdul Hadi Al Hajri

Al-Anoud bint Mana Al Hajri (Arabic: العنود بنت مانع الهاجري) is a Qatari royal and the second wife of Tamim bin Hamad Al Thani, the emir of Qatar. She is the daughter of Sheikh Mana bin Abdul Hadi Al Hajri, who served as the Qatari ambassador to Jordan. Sheikha Al-Anoud married into the Qatari royal family in 2009 and is the mother of five of the Emir's children. She is the owner of Erbilginler Yalısı, the most expensive house in Turkey.

== Biography ==
Al-Anoud bint Mana Al Hajri is the daughter of Sheikh Mana bin Abdul Hadi Al Hajri, a businessman who served as Qatar's Ambassador to the Kingdom of Jordan. On 3 March 2009, she married Sheikh Tamim bin Hamad Al Thani, a Qatari prince and the son of Emir Hamad bin Khalifa Al Thani and Sheikha Moza bint Nasser. She is Sheikh Tamim's second wife, as he married his second cousin Sheikha Jawaher bint Hamad bin Suhaim Al Thani in 2005. Her husband succeeded his father as Emir of Qatar on 25 June 2013.

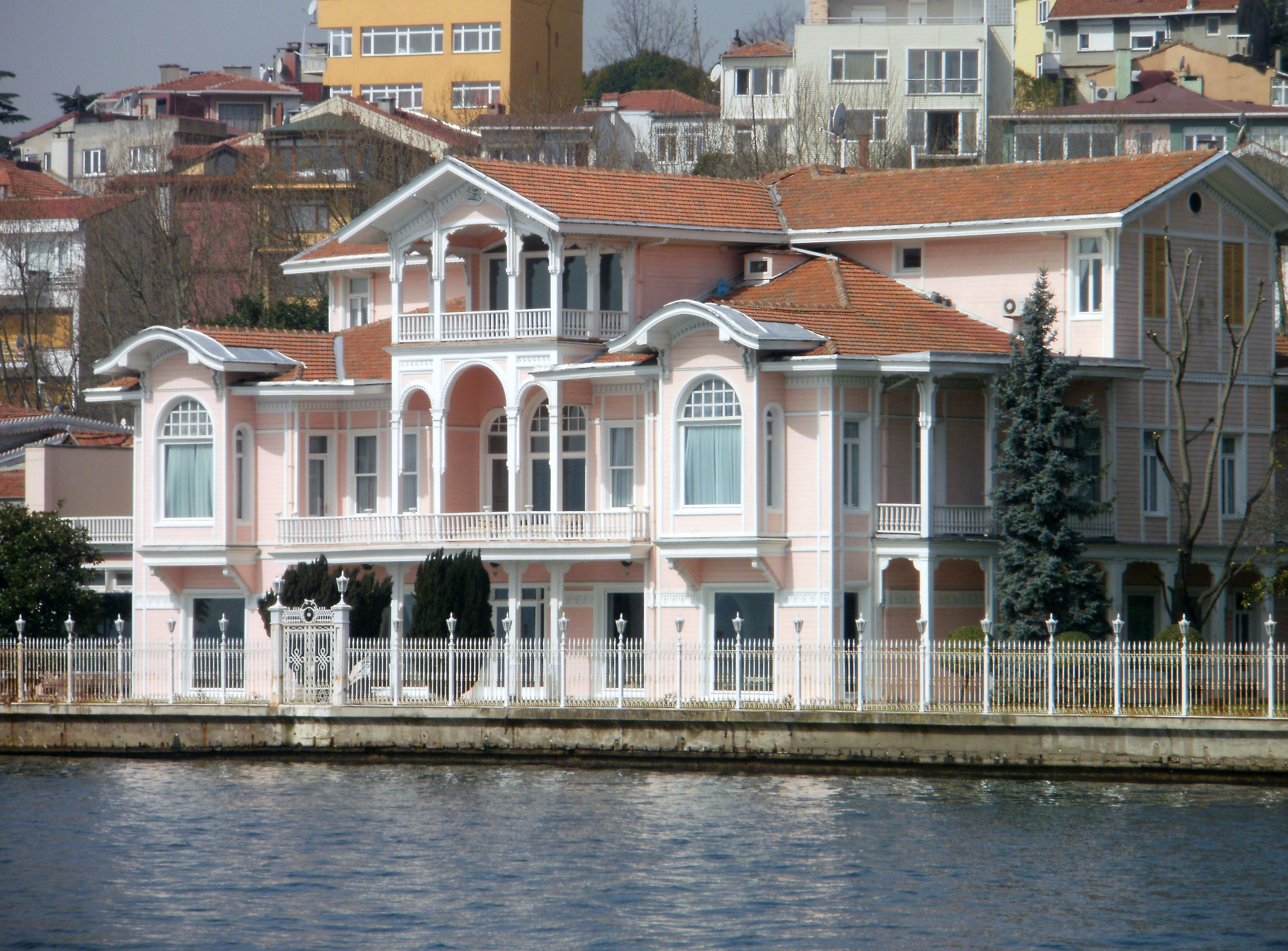
Erbilginler Yalısı, Sheikha Al-Anoud's home in Turkey

Sheikha Al-Anoud and the Emir have five children, three daughters and two sons:

- Sheikha Naylah bint Tamim Al Thani (born 27 May 2010)
- Sheikh Abdullah bin Tamim Al Thani (born 29 September 2012)
- Sheikha Rodha bint Tamim Al Thani (born January 2014)
- Sheikh Alqaqa'a bin Tamim Al Thani (born 3 October 2015)
- Sheikha Moza bint Tamim Al Thani (born 19 May 2018)

On 15 December 2011, in honor of National Day, Sheikha Al-Anoud attended a performance of the operetta Homeland of Freedom And Peace at Al Bayan Primary School for Girls in Doha.

In 2015, the Emir paid 100 million euros to purchase Erbilginler Yalısı in Istanbul, the most expensive house in Turkey, as a gift for Sheikha Al-Anoud. Officially, the purchase was made for Sheikha Al-Anoud's father by a London-based real estate company in order to conceal the Emir's involvement. The 64-room mansion, located on the banks of Bosporus, is 5,800 square metres (62,000 sq ft) in size.

Styles of Sheikha Al-Anoud
- Reference style: Her Highness
- Spoken style: Your Highness
- Alternative style: Sheikha
