= List of spouses of heads of government =

The following is a list of spouses of current heads of government. In most cases, such as parliamentary systems, semi-presidential systems, and constitutional monarchies, the head of government is called a "prime minister", "premier", or "president/chairman of the council of ministers". (Note: In case of a woman, the title of "chairman" can take on the form of "chairwoman", "chairperson" or simply "chair", or be replaced by "president".) In presidential systems, the president may be simultaneously head of state and head of government.

== Member and observer states of the United Nations ==
State	Head of government	Spouse	Image
Afghanistan	Prime Minister Hasan Akhund	—N/a	
Albania	Prime Minister Edi Rama	Linda Rama	
Algeria	Prime Minister Aymen Benabderrahmane	—N/a	
Andorra	Head of Government Xavier Espot Zamora	—N/a	
Angola	President João Lourenço	Ana Dias Lourenço	
Antigua and Barbuda	Prime Minister Gaston Browne	Maria Bird-Browne	
Argentina	President Javier Milei	Yuyito González (domestic partner)	
Armenia	Prime Minister Nikol Pashinyan	Anna Hakobyan	
Australia	Prime Minister Anthony Albanese	Jodie Haydon	
Austria	Federal Chancellor Christian Stocker	Gerda Legenstein	
Azerbaijan	Prime Minister Ali Asadov	Zamira Asadova	
Bahamas	Prime Minister Philip Davis	Anne-Marie Davis	
Bahrain	Prime Minister Crown Prince Salman bin Hamad Al Khalifa	Divorced; Formerly, Shaikha Hala bint D'aij Al Khalifa (div. 2005)	
Bangladesh	Prime Minister Muhammad Yunus	Afrozi Yunus	
Barbados	Prime Minister Mia Mottley	—N/a	
Belarus	Prime Minister Alexander Turchin	Inna	
Belgium	Prime Minister Bart De Wever	Veerle Hegge	
Belize	Prime Minister Johnny Briceño	Rossana Maria Briceño	
Benin	President Patrice Talon	Claudine Talon	
Bhutan	Prime Minister Tshering Tobgay	Tashi Dolma	
Bolivia	President Rodrigo Paz	Maria Elena Urquidi	
Bosnia and Herzegovina	Chairman of the Council of Ministers Borjana Krišto	Branko Krišto	
Botswana	President Duma Boko	Kaone Boko	
Brazil	President Luiz Inácio Lula da Silva	Rosângela Lula da Silva	
Brunei	Prime Minister Sultan Hassanal Bolkiah	Queen Saleha	
Bulgaria	Prime Minister Kiril Petkov	Linda McKenzie	
Burkina Faso	Prime Minister Apollinaire Joachim Kyélem de Tambèla	?	
Burundi	Prime Minister Gervais Ndirakobuca	—N/a	
Cambodia	Prime Minister Hun Manet	Pich Chanmony	
Cameroon	Prime Minister Joseph Ngute	—N/a	
Canada	Prime Minister Mark Carney	Diana Fox Carney	
Cape Verde	Prime Minister Ulisses Correia e Silva	—N/a	
Central African Republic	Prime Minister Félix Moloua	—N/a	
Chad	Acting Prime Minister Saleh Kebzabo	Jeanne Kebzabo	
Chile	President José Antonio Kast	Pía Adriasola	
China	Premier of the State Council Li Qiang	Lin Huan	
Colombia	President Gustavo Petro	Verónica Alcocer	
Comoros	President Azali Assoumani	Ambari Daroueche	
Congo, Democratic Republic of the	Prime Minister Jean-Michel Sama Lukonde	—N/a	
Congo, Republic of the	Prime Minister Anatole Collinet Makosso	—N/a	
Costa Rica	President Rodrigo Chaves Robles	Signe Zeicate	
Croatia	Prime Minister Andrej Plenković	Ana Maslać Plenković	
Cuba	President of the Council of Ministers Manuel Marrero Cruz	—N/a	
Cyprus	President Nikos Christodoulides	Philippa Karsera	
Czech Republic	Prime Minister Petr Fiala	Jana Fialová	
Denmark	Prime Minister Mette Frederiksen	Bo Tengberg	
Djibouti	Prime Minister Abdoulkader Kamil Mohamed	—N/a	
Dominica	Prime Minister Roosevelt Skerrit	Melissa Poponne Skerrit	
Dominican Republic	President Luis Abinader	Raquel Arbaje	
Ecuador	President Daniel Noboa	Lavinia Valbonesi	
Egypt	Prime Minister Mostafa Madbouly	—N/a	
El Salvador	President Nayib Bukele	Gabriela Rodríguez de Bukele	
Equatorial Guinea	Prime Minister Manuela Roka Botey	—N/a	
Eritrea	President Isaias Afwerki	Saba Haile	
Estonia	Prime Minister Kaja Kallas	Arvo Hallik	
Eswatini	Prime Minister Russell Dlamini	Philile Dlamini	
Ethiopia	Prime Minister Abiy Ahmed	Zinash Tayachew	
Fiji	Prime Minister Sitiveni Rabuka	Suluweti Tuiloma	
Finland	Prime Minister Petteri Orpo	Niina Kanniainen-Orpo	
France	Prime Minister Sébastien Lecornu	—N/a	
Gabon	Prime Minister Alain Claude Bilie By Nze	—N/a	
Gambia, The	President Adama Barrow	Fatoumatta Bah	
Gambia, The	President Adama Barrow	Sarjo Mballow	
Georgia	Prime Minister Irakli Kobakhidze	Natalia Motsonelidze	
Germany	Federal Chancellor Friedrich Merz	Charlotte Gass	
Ghana	President John Mahama	Lordina Mahama	
Greece	Prime Minister Kyriakos Mitsotakis	Mareva Grabowski-Mitsotakis	
Grenada	Prime Minister Keith Mitchell	Marietta Mitchell	
Guatemala	President Alejandro Giammattei	Divorced; Formerly Rosana Cáceres (div. ?)	
Guinea	Acting Prime Minister Mohamed Béavogui	—N/a	
Guinea-Bissau	Prime Minister Nuno Gomes Nabiam	—N/a	
Guyana	Prime Minister Mark Phillips	Mignon Bowen-Phillips	
Haiti	Prime Minister Ariel Henry	Annie Claude Massiau	
Honduras	President Xiomara Castro	Manuel Zelaya	
Hungary	Prime Minister Viktor Orbán	Anikó Lévai	
Iceland	Prime Minister Katrín Jakobsdóttir	Gunnar Örn Sigvaldason	
India	Prime Minister Narendra Modi	Estranged; Jashodaben Modi (sep. 1971)	
Indonesia	President Prabowo Subianto	Separated; Titiek Suharto (sep. 1998)	
Iran	President Masoud Pezeshkian	Fatemeh Majidi	
Iraq	Prime Minister Muhammad Shayya al-Sudani	?	
Ireland	Taoiseach Micheál Martin	Mary Martin	
Israel	Prime Minister Benjamin Netanyahu	Sara Netanyahu	
Italy	President of the Council of Ministers Giorgia Meloni	—N/a	
Ivory Coast	Prime Minister Patrick Achi	—N/a	
Jamaica	Prime Minister Andrew Holness	Juliet Holness	
Japan	Prime Minister Sanae Takaichi	Taku Yamamoto	
Jordan	Prime Minister Bisher Al-Khasawneh	Rana Sultan	
Kazakhstan	Prime Minister Askar Mamin	Altynai Mamina	
Kenya	President Uhuru Kenyatta	Margaret Kenyatta	
Kiribati	President Taneti Maamau	Teiraeng Tentoa Maamau	
Kuwait	Prime Minister Sheikh Sabah Al-Khalid Al-Sabah	Sheikha Aida Salim Al Ali Al Sabah	
Kyrgyzstan	Chairman of the Cabinet of Ministers Akylbek Japarov	?	
Laos	Prime Minister Sonexay Siphandone	Vandala Siphandone	
Latvia	Prime Minister Arturs Krišjānis Kariņš	Anda Kariņa	
Lebanon	President of the Council of Ministers Nawaf Salam	Sahar Baassiri	
Lesotho	Prime Minister Moeketsi Majoro	'Masekoalane Majoro	
Liberia	President Joseph Boakai	Kartumu Yarta Boakai	
Libya	Prime Minister Abdul Hamid Dbeibeh	Amina el-Shawush	
Liechtenstein	Head of Government Brigitte Haas	Hubert Ospelt	
Lithuania	Prime Minister Inga Ruginienė	Vismantas Ruginis	
Luxembourg	Prime Minister Luc Frieden	Marjolijne Droogleever Fortuyn	
Madagascar	Prime Minister Herintsalama Rajaonarivelo	—N/a	
Malawi	President Peter Mutharika	Gertrude Maseko	
Malaysia	Prime Minister Anwar Ibrahim	Wan Azizah Wan Ismail	
Maldives	President Mohamed Muizzu	Sajidha Mohamed	
Mali	Acting Prime Minister Choguel Kokalla Maïga	—N/a	
Malta	Prime Minister Robert Abela	Lydia Abela Zerafa	
Marshall Islands	President Hilda Heine	Thomas Kijiner Jr	
Mauritania	Prime Minister Mokhtar Ould Djay	—N/a	
Mauritius	Prime Minister Navin Ramgoolam	Veena Ramgoolam	
Mexico	President Claudia Sheinbaum Pardo	Jesús María Tarriba	
Micronesia, Federated States of	President Wesley Simina	Ancelly	
Moldova	Prime Minister Alexandru Munteanu	—N/a	
Monaco	Minister of State Christophe Mirmand	—N/a	
Mongolia	Prime Minister Gombojavyn Zandanshatar	—N/a	
Montenegro	Prime Minister Milojko Spajić	Milena Spajić	
Morocco	Head of Government Aziz Akhannouch	Salwa Idrissi Akhannouch	
Mozambique	Prime Minister Maria Benvinda Levy	—N/a	
Myanmar	President Min Aung Hlaing	Kyu Kyu Hla	
Namibia	Prime Minister Elijah Ngurare	—N/a	
Nauru	President David Adeang	—N/a	
Nepal	Prime Minister Sushila Karki	Durga Prasad Subedi	
Netherlands	Prime Minister Rob Jetten	Nicolás Keenan	
New Zealand	Prime Minister Christopher Luxon	Amanda Luxon	
Nicaragua	President Daniel Ortega	Rosario Murillo	
Niger	Prime Minister Ali Lamine Zeine	—N/a	
Nigeria	President Bola Tinubu	Remi Tinubu	
North Korea	Premier of the Cabinet Kim Tok-hun	—N/a	
North Macedonia	President of the Government Zoran Zaev	Zorica Zaeva	
Norway	Prime Minister Jonas Gahr Støre	Marit Slagsvold	
Oman	Prime Minister Sultan Haitham bin Tariq	Sayyida Ahad bint Abdullah	
Pakistan	Prime Minister Shehbaz Sharif	Nusrat Shehbaz	
Pakistan	Prime Minister Shehbaz Sharif	Tehmina Durrani	
Palau	President Surangel Whipps Jr.	Valerie Esang Remengesau	
Palestine	Prime Minister Mohammad Shtayyeh	—N/a	
Panama	President José Raúl Mulino	Marisel Cohen de Mulino	
Papua New Guinea	Prime Minister James Marape	Rachael Marape	
Paraguay	President Santiago Peña	Leticia Ocampos	
Peru	President of the Council of Ministers Ernesto Álvarez Miranda	—N/a	
Philippines	President Bongbong Marcos	Liza Araneta Marcos	
Poland	Chairman of the Council of Ministers Donald Tusk	Małgorzata Tusk	
Portugal	Prime Minister Luís Montenegro	Carla Montenegro	
Qatar	Prime Minister Sheikh Mohammed bin Abdulrahman bin Jassim Al Thani	—N/a	
Romania	Prime Minister Ilie Bolojan	—N/a	
Russia	Chairman of the Government Mikhail Mishustin	Vladlena Mishustina	
Rwanda	Prime Minister Justin Nsengiyumva	?	
Saint Kitts and Nevis	Prime Minister Terrance Drew	—N/a	
Saint Lucia	Prime Minister Philip J. Pierre	—N/a	
Saint Vincent and the Grenadines	Prime Minister Godwin Friday	—N/a	
Samoa	Prime Minister Laʻauli Leuatea Schmidt	—N/a	
San Marino	Secretary for Foreign and Political Affairs Luca Beccari	—N/a	
São Tomé and Príncipe	Prime Minister Américo Ramos	—N/a	
Saudi Arabia	Prime Minister King Salman	Fahda bint Falah Al Hithlain	
Senegal	President Bassirou Diomaye Faye	Marie Khone Faye & Absa Faye	
Serbia	Prime Minister Đuro Macut	—N/a	
Seychelles	President Patrick Herminie	Veronique Herminie	
Sierra Leone	Chief Minister David Moinina Sengeh	—N/a	
Singapore	Prime Minister Lawrence Wong	Loo Tze Lui	
Slovakia	Prime Minister Robert Fico	Svetlana Svobodová	
Slovenia	Prime Minister Robert Golob	Tina Gaber	
Solomon Islands	Prime Minister Manasseh Sogavare	Emmy Sogavare	
Somalia	Prime Minister Hamza Abdi Barre	—N/a	
South Africa	President Cyril Ramaphosa	Tshepo Motsepe	
South Korea	President Lee Jae Myung	Kim Hea Kyung	
South Sudan	President Salva Kiir	Mary Ayen Mayardit	
South Sudan	President Salva Kiir	Aluel William Nyuon Bany	
Spain	President of the Government Pedro Sánchez	María Begoña Gómez Fernández	
Sri Lanka	Prime Minister Harini Amarasuriya	—N/a	
Sudan	Prime Minister Kamil Idris	Azza Mohyeldeen Ahmed	
Suriname	President Jennifer Geerlings-Simons	Glenn Geerlings	
Sweden	Prime Minister Ulf Kristersson	Birgitta Ed	
Switzerland	President Karin Keller-Sutter	Morten Keller	
Syria	President Ahmed al-Sharaa	Latifa al-Droubi	
Tajikistan	Prime Minister Qohir Rasulzoda	Iqbolkhon Nazirova	
Tanzania	Prime Minister Mwigulu Nchemba	—N/a	
Thailand	Prime Minister Anutin Charnvirakul	Thananont Niramit	
Timor-Leste	Prime Minister Xanana Gusmão	—N/a	
Togo	Prime Minister Faure Gnassingbé	—N/a	
Tonga	Prime Minister ʻAisake Eke	—N/a	
Trinidad and Tobago	Prime Minister Kamla Persad-Bissessar	Gregory Bissessar	
Tunisia	Head of Government Sara Zaafarani	—N/a	
Turkey	President Recep Tayyip Erdoğan	Emine Erdoğan	
Turkmenistan	President Serdar Berdimuhamedow	—N/a	
Tuvalu	Prime Minister Feleti Teo	—N/a	
Uganda	Prime Minister Robinah Nabbanja	?	
Ukraine	Prime Minister Yulia Svyrydenko	Serhiy Derlemenko	
United Arab Emirates	Prime Minister Sheikh Mohammed bin Rashid Al Maktoum	Sheikha Hind bint Maktoum Al Maktoum	
United Kingdom	Prime Minister Andy Burnham	Marie-France van Heel	
United States	President Donald Trump	Melania Trump	
Uruguay	President Yamandú Orsi	Laura Alonsopérez	
Uzbekistan	Prime Minister Abdulla Aripov	?	
Vanuatu	Prime Minister Jotham Napat	Lettis Napat	
Vatican City	President of the Governorate Sister Raffaella Petrini	Celibate	
Venezuela	President Nicolás Maduro (disputed during the Venezuelan presidential crisis, 11 January 2019 – 5 January 2023 (Note: Maduro's legitimacy as President remains challenged by many within the international community due to concerns around the legitimacy of the 2018 Venezuelan presidential election, despite Juan Guaidó relinquishing his claim to the Presidency on 5 January 2023.))	Cilia Flores	
Vietnam	Prime Minister Phạm Minh Chính	Lê Thị Bích Trân	
Yemen	Prime Minister Maeen Abdulmalik Saeed	—N/a	
Zambia	President Hakainde Hichilema	Mutinta Hichilema	
Zimbabwe	President Emmerson Mnangagwa	Auxillia Mnangagwa	

== Other states ==
The following states are in free association with another UN member state.

State	Head of government	Spouse	Image
Cook Islands	Prime Minister Mark Brown	—N/a	
Niue	Premier Dalton Tagelagi	—N/a	

The following states control their territory and are recognised by at least one UN member state.

State	Head of government	Spouse	Image
Abkhazia	Prime Minister Alexander Ankvab	—N/a	
Kosovo	Prime Minister Albin Kurti	Rita Augestad Knudsen	
Northern Cyprus	Prime Minister Faiz Sucuoğlu	—N/a	
Sahrawi Republic	Prime Minister Bouchraya Hammoudi Bayoun	—N/a	
Somaliland	President Muse Bihi Abdi	Zahra Abdilahi Absia	
Somaliland	President Muse Bihi Abdi	Roda Ahmed Omar	
South Ossetia	Prime Minister Gennady Bekoyev	—N/a	
Taiwan	President of the Executive Yuan Chen Chien-jen	Lo Feng-ping	

The following states control their territory, but are not recognised by any UN member states.

State	Head of government	Spouse	Image
Transnistria	Prime Minister Aleksandr Martynov	—N/a	

== See also ==
- List of heads of state by diplomatic precedence
- List of current foreign ministers
- List of current finance ministers
- List of current defence ministers
- List of current interior ministers
- List of current presidents of assembly
- List of current vice presidents
- Lists of office-holders
- List of current state leaders by date of assumption of office
- List of state leaders by year
- Lists of state leaders
- List of spouses of heads of state
- List of current permanent representatives to the United Nations
