= List of spouses of heads of state =

The following is a list of spouses of current heads of state.

== States recognised by the United Nations ==
State	Head of state	Spouse	Image
Afghanistan	Supreme Leader Hibatullah Akhundzada	Reported two wives (unconfirmed)	
Albania	President Bajram Begaj	Armanda Begaj	
Algeria	President Abdelmadjid Tebboune	Fatima Zohra Bella	
Andorra	Co-Prince Josep-Lluís Serrano Pentinat	Celibate	
Andorra	Co-Prince Emmanuel Macron	Brigitte Macron	
Andorra	Representative of the Episcopal Co-Prince Eduard Ibáñez Pulido	?	
Andorra	Representative of the French Co-Prince Patrice Faure	Sandrine Michalon-Faure	
Angola	President João Lourenço	Ana Dias Lourenço	
Antigua and Barbuda	King Charles III	Queen Camilla	
Antigua and Barbuda	Governor-General Rodney Williams	Sandra Williams	
Argentina	President Javier Milei	Yuyito González (domestic partner)	
Armenia	President Vahagn Khachaturyan	Anahit Minasyan	
Australia	King Charles III	Queen Camilla	
Australia	Governor-General Sam Mostyn	Simeon Beckett SC	
Austria	President Alexander Van der Bellen	Doris Schmidauer	
Azerbaijan	President Ilham Aliyev	Mehriban Aliyeva	
Bahamas, The	King Charles III	Queen Camilla	
Bahamas, The	Governor-General Cynthia A. Pratt	Widowed; Formerly Joseph B. Pratt	
Bahrain	King Hamad bin Isa Al Khalifa	Sabika bint Ibrahim Al Khalifa	
Bahrain	King Hamad bin Isa Al Khalifa	Sheia bint Hassan Al Khrayyesh Al Ajmi	
Bahrain	King Hamad bin Isa Al Khalifa	Hessa bint Faisal bin Muhammad bin Shuraim Al Marri	
Bahrain	King Hamad bin Isa Al Khalifa	Manal bint Jabor Al Naimi	
Bangladesh	President Mohammed Shahabuddin	Rebecca Sultana	
Barbados	President Jeffrey Bostic	?	
Belarus	President Alexander Lukashenko	Galina Lukashenko	
Belgium	King Philippe	Queen Mathilde	
Belize	King Charles III	Queen Camilla	
Belize	Governor-General Froyla Tzalam	Daniel Mendez	
Benin	President Patrice Talon	Claudine Talon	
Bhutan	King Jigme Khesar Namgyel Wangchuck	Queen Jetsun Pema	
Bolivia	President Rodrigo Paz	Maria Elena Urquidi	
Bosnia and Herzegovina	High Representative Christian Schmidt	Ria Hess	
Bosnia and Herzegovina	Chairman of the Presidency Denis Bećirović	Mirela Bećirović	
Bosnia and Herzegovina	Member of the Presidency Željko Komšić	Sabina Komšić	
Bosnia and Herzegovina	Member of the Presidency Željka Cvijanović	Aleksandar Cvijanović	
Botswana	President Duma Boko	Kaone Boko	
Brazil	President Luiz Inácio Lula da Silva	Rosângela Lula da Silva	
Brunei	Sultan Hassanal Bolkiah	Queen Saleha	
Bulgaria	President Iliana Iotova	Andrey Iotov	
Burkina Faso	Interim President Ibrahim Traoré	?	
Burundi	President Évariste Ndayishimiye	Angeline Ndayishimiye	
Cambodia	King Norodom Sihamoni	—N/a	
Cameroon	President Paul Biya	Chantal Biya	
Canada	King Charles III	Queen Camilla	
Canada	Governor General of Canada Mary Simon	Whit Fraser	
Cape Verde	President José Maria Neves	Débora Katisa Carvalho	
Central African Republic	President Faustin-Archange Touadéra	Brigitte Touadéra	
Central African Republic	President Faustin-Archange Touadéra	Tina Touadéra	
Chad	President Mahamat Déby	Dahabaya Oumar Souni	
Chile	President José Antonio Kast	Pía Adriasola	
China	General Secretary of the Communist Party and President Xi Jinping	Peng Liyuan	
Colombia	President Abelardo de la Espriella	Ana Lucía Pineda	[[]]
Comoros	President Azali Assoumani	Ambari Daroueche	
Congo, Democratic Republic of the	President Félix Tshisekedi	Denise Tshisekedi	
Congo, Republic of the	President Denis Sassou Nguesso	Antoinette Sassou Nguesso	
Costa Rica	President Laura Fernández	Jeffrey Umaña	
Croatia	President Zoran Milanović	Sanja Musić Milanović	
Cuba	First Secretary of the Communist Party and President Miguel Díaz-Canel	Lis Cuesta Peraza	
Cyprus	President Nikos Christodoulides	Philippa Karsera	
Czech Republic	President Petr Pavel	Eva Pavlová	
Denmark	King Frederik X	Queen Mary	
Djibouti	President Ismaïl Omar Guelleh	Kadra Mahamoud Haid	
Dominica	President Sylvanie Burton	Gilbert Burton	
Dominican Republic	President Luis Abinader	Raquel Arbaje	
East Timor	President José Ramos-Horta	Divorced; Formerly Ana Pessoa Pinto	
Ecuador	President Daniel Noboa	Lavinia Valbonesi	
Egypt	President Abdel Fattah el-Sisi	Entissar Amer	
El Salvador	President Nayib Bukele	Gabriela Rodríguez de Bukele	
Equatorial Guinea	President Teodoro Obiang Nguema Mbasogo	Constancia Mangue	
Eritrea	Chairman of the People's Front for Democracy and Justice and President Isaias Afewerki	Saba Haile	
Estonia	President Alar Karis	Sirje Karis	
Eswatini	King Mswati III	Inkhosikati LaMatsebula	
Eswatini	King Mswati III	Inkhosikati LaMotsa	
Eswatini	King Mswati III	Inkhosikati LaMbikiza	
Eswatini	King Mswati III	Inkhosikati LaNgangaza	
Eswatini	King Mswati III	Inkhosikati LaGija	
Eswatini	King Mswati III	Inkhosikati LaMagongo	
Eswatini	King Mswati III	Inkhosikati LaMahlangu	
Eswatini	King Mswati III	Inkhosikati LaNtentesa	
Eswatini	King Mswati III	Inkhosikati LaNkambule	
Eswatini	King Mswati III	Inkhosikati LaFogiyane	
Eswatini	King Mswati III	Inkhosikati LaMashwama	
Ethiopia	President Taye Atske Selassie	—N/a	
Fiji	President Wiliame Katonivere	Filomena Katonivere	
Finland	President Alexander Stubb	Suzanne Innes-Stubb	
France	President Emmanuel Macron	Brigitte Macron	
Gabon	President Brice Oligui	Zita Nyangue Oligui	
Gambia, The	President Adama Barrow	Fatoumatta Bah-Barrow	
Gambia, The	President Adama Barrow	Sarjo Mballow	
Georgia	President Mikheil Kavelashvili	Tamar Bagrationi	
Germany	President Frank-Walter Steinmeier	Elke Büdenbender	
Ghana	President John Mahama	Lordina Mahama	
Greece	President Konstantinos Tasoulas	Fani Stathopoulou	
Grenada	King Charles III	Queen Camilla	
Grenada	Governor-General Cécile La Grenade	—N/a	
Guatemala	President Bernardo Arévalo	Lucrecia Peinado	
Guinea	Interim President Mamady Doumbouya	Lauriane Doumbouya	
Guinea-Bissau	President Umaro Sissoco Embaló	Dinisia Reis Embaló	
Guyana	President Irfaan Ali	Arya Ali	
Haiti	Chairman of the Transitional Presidential Council Leslie Voltaire	?	
Honduras	President Nasry Asfura	Lissette del Cid	
Hungary	President Tamás Sulyok	Zsuzsanna Sulyok	
Iceland	President Halla Tómasdóttir	Björn Skúlason	
India	President Droupadi Murmu	Widowed; Formerly Shyam Charan Murmu (d. 2014)	
Indonesia	President Prabowo Subianto	Separated; Titiek Suharto (sep. 1998)	
Iran	Supreme Leader Ali Khamenei	Mansoureh Khojasteh Bagherzadeh	
Iraq	President Abdul Latif Rashid	Shanaz Ibrahim Ahmed	
Ireland	President Catherine Connolly	Brian McEnery	
Israel	President Isaac Herzog	Michal Herzog	
Italy	President Sergio Mattarella	Widowed; Formerly Marisa Chiazzese (d. 2012)	
Ivory Coast	President Alassane Ouattara	Dominique Ouattara	
Jamaica	King Charles III	Queen Camilla	
Jamaica	Governor-General Patrick Allen	Denise Allen	
Japan	Emperor Naruhito	Empress Masako	
Jordan	King Abdullah II	Queen Rania	
Kazakhstan	President Kassym-Jomart Tokayev	Divorced; Formerly Nadezhda Tokayeva (div. 2020)	
Kenya	President William Ruto	Rachel Ruto	
Kiribati	President Taneti Mamau	Teiraeng Mamau	
Kuwait	Emir Mishal Al-Ahmad Al-Jaber Al-Sabah	Nuria Sabah Al-Salim Al-Sabah	
Kuwait	Emir Mishal Al-Ahmad Al-Jaber Al-Sabah	Munira Badah Al-Mutairi	
Kyrgyzstan	President Sadyr Japarov	Aigul Japarova	
Laos	General Secretary of the People's Revolutionary Party and President Thongloun Sisoulith	Naly Sisoulith	
Latvia	President Edgars Rinkēvičs	—N/a	
Lebanon	President Joseph Aoun	Nehmat Aoun	
Lesotho	King Letsie III	Queen 'Masenate Mohato Seeiso	
Liberia	President Joseph Boakai	Katumu Yatta Boakai	
Libya	Chairman of the Presidential Council Mohamed al-Menfi	Sara al-Menfi	
Liechtenstein	Prince Hans-Adam II	Widowed; Formerly Princess Marie (d. 2021)	
Liechtenstein	Regent Hereditary Prince Alois	Hereditary Princess Sophie	
Lithuania	President Gitanas Nausėda	Diana Nausėdienė	
Luxembourg	Grand Duke Guillaume V	Stéphanie	
Madagascar	President Michael Randrianirina	Elisa Randrianirina	
Malawi	President Lazarus Chakwera	Monica Chakwera	
Malaysia	Yang di-Pertuan Agong Ibrahim Iskandar	Raja Permaisuri Agong Zarith Sofiah	
Maldives	President Mohamed Muizzu	Sajdha Mohamed	
Mali	Interim President Assimi Goïta	Lala Diallo	
Malta	President Myriam Spiteri Debono	Widowed; Formerly Anthony Spiteri Debono (d. 2025)	
Marshall Islands	President Hilda Heine	Tommy Kijiner	
Mauritania	President Mohamed Ould Ghazouani	Mariem Mint Dah	
Mauritius	President Dharam Gokhool	Brinda Gokhool	
Mexico	President Claudia Sheinbaum	Jesús María Tarriba	
Micronesia, Federated States of	President Wesley Simina	—N/a	
Moldova	President Maia Sandu	—N/a	
Monaco	Prince Albert II	Princess Charlene	
Mongolia	President Ukhnaagiin Khürelsükh	Bolortsetseg Khürelsükh	
Montenegro	President Jakov Milatović	Milena Milatović	
Morocco	King Mohammed VI	Divorced; Formerly Princess Lalla Salma (div. 2018)	
Mozambique	President Daniel Chapo	Gueta Sulemane Chapo	
Myanmar	President Min Aung Hlaing	Kyu Kyu Hla	
Namibia	President Netumbo Nandi-Ndaitwah	Epaphras Denga Ndaitwah	
Nauru	President David Adeang	—N/a	
Nepal	President Ram Chandra Poudel	Savita Poudel	
Netherlands	King Willem-Alexander	Queen Máxima	
New Zealand	King Charles III	Queen Camilla	
New Zealand	Governor-General Cindy Kiro	Richard Davies	
Nicaragua	Co-president Rosario Murillo	Daniel Ortega	
Nicaragua	Co-president Daniel Ortega	Rosario Murillo	
Niger	President Abdourahamane Tiani	?	
Nigeria	President Bola Tinubu	Remi Tinubu	
North Korea	General Secretary of the Workers' Party, President of the State Affairs and Supreme Leader Kim Jong-un	Ri Sol-ju	
North Korea	Chairman of the Standing Committee of the Supreme People's Assembly Choe Ryong-hae	?	
North Macedonia	President Gordana Siljanovska-Davkova	Blagoja Davkov	
Norway	King Haakon VIII	Queen Mette-Marit	
Oman	Sultan Haitham bin Tariq	Sayyida Ahad bint Abdullah	
Pakistan	President Asif Ali Zardari	Widowed; Formerly Benazir Bhutto (d. 2007)	
Palau	President Surangel Whipps Jr.	Valerie Whipps	
Palestine	President Mahmoud Abbas	Amina Abbas	
Panama	President José Raúl Mulino	Marisel Cohen de Mulino	
Papua New Guinea	King Charles III	Queen Camilla	
Papua New Guinea	Governor-General Bob Dadae	Hannah Dadae	
Paraguay	President Mario Abdo Benítez	Silvana López Moreira	
Peru	President Keiko Fujimori	Divorce (Vacant)	
Philippines	President Bongbong Marcos	Liza Araneta Marcos	
Poland	President Karol Nawrocki	Marta Nawrocka	
Portugal	President António José Seguro	Margarida Maldonado Freitas	
Qatar	Emir Sheikh Tamim bin Hamad Al Thani	Sheikha Jawahir bint Hamad bin Suhaim al-Thani	
Qatar	Emir Sheikh Tamim bin Hamad Al Thani	Sheikha Al-Anoud bint Mana Al Hajri	
Qatar	Emir Sheikh Tamim bin Hamad Al Thani	Sheikha Noora bint Hathal Al Dosari	
Romania	President Nicușor Dan	Mirabela Grădinaru (domestic partner)	
Russia	President Vladimir Putin	Divorced; Formerly Lyudmila Putina (div. 2014)	
Rwanda	President Paul Kagame	Jeannette Kagame	
Saint Kitts and Nevis	King Charles III	Queen Camilla	
Saint Kitts and Nevis	Governor-General Tapley Seaton	—N/a	
Saint Lucia	King Charles III	Queen Camilla	
Saint Lucia	Governor-General Errol Charles	—N/a	
Saint Vincent and the Grenadines	King Charles III	Queen Camilla	
Saint Vincent and the Grenadines	Governor-General Susan Dougan	Hugh Dougan	
Samoa	O le Ao o le Malo Tuimalealiʻifano Vaʻaletoʻa Sualauvi II	Masiofo Faʻamausili Leinafo	
San Marino	Captain Regent Denise Bronzetti	?	
San Marino	Captain Regent Italo Righi	Maria Righi	
São Tomé and Príncipe	President Carlos Vila Nova	Fátima Vila Nova	
Saudi Arabia	King Salman	Fahda bint Falah bin Sultan Al Hithalayn	
Senegal	President Bassirou Diomaye Faye	Marie Khone Faye	
Senegal	President Bassirou Diomaye Faye	Absa Faye	
Serbia	President Aleksandar Vučić	Tamara Vučić	
Seychelles	President Patrick Herminie	Veronique Herminie	
Sierra Leone	President Julius Maada Bio	Fatima Bio	
Singapore	President Tharman Shanmugaratnam	Jane Yumiko Ittogi	
Slovakia	President Peter Pellegrini	—N/a	
Slovenia	President Nataša Pirc Musar	Aleš Musar	
Solomon Islands	King Charles III	Queen Camilla	
Solomon Islands	Governor-General David Vunagi	Mary Vunagi	
Somalia	President Hassan Sheikh Mohamud	Qamar Ali	
South Africa	President Cyril Ramaphosa	Tshepo Motsepe	
South Korea	President Lee Jae-myung	Kim Hye-kyung	
South Sudan	President Salva Kiir	Mary Ayen Mayardit	
South Sudan	President Salva Kiir	Aluel William Nyuon Bany	
Spain	King Felipe VI	Queen Letizia	
Sri Lanka	President Anura Kumara Dissanayake	Mallika Dissanayake	
Sudan	Chairman of the Sovereignty Council Abdel Fattah al-Burhan	—N/a	
Suriname	President Chan Santokhi	Mellisa Santokhi-Seenacherry	
Sweden	King Carl XVI Gustaf	Queen Silvia	
Switzerland	President Viola Amherd	—N/a	
Switzerland	Vice President Karin Keller-Sutter	Morten Keller	
Switzerland	Member of the Federal Council Guy Parmelin	—N/a	
Switzerland	Member of the Federal Council Albert Rösti	Theres Rösti	
Switzerland	Member of the Federal Council Élisabeth Baume-Schneider	Pierre-André Baume	
Switzerland	Member of the Federal Council Ignazio Cassis	Paola Cassis	
Switzerland	Member of the Federal Council Beat Jans	Tracy Renee Glass	
Syria	President Ahmed al-Sharaa	Latifa al-Droubi	
Tajikistan	President Emomali Rahmon	Azizmo Asadullayeva	
Tanzania	President Samia Suluhu Hassan	Hafidh Ameir	
Thailand	King Vajiralongkorn	Queen Suthida	
Thailand	King Vajiralongkorn	Chao Khun Phra Sineenat Bilaskalayani	
Togo	President Faure Gnassingbé	Nana Ama Kuffour	
Tonga	King Tupou VI	Queen Nanasipauʻu Tukuʻaho	
Trinidad and Tobago	President Christine Kangaloo	Kerwyn Garcia	
Tunisia	President Kais Saied	Ichraf Saied	
Turkey	President Recep Tayyip Erdoğan	Emine Erdoğan	
Turkmenistan	President Serdar Berdimuhamedow	?	
Tuvalu	King Charles III	Queen Camilla	
Tuvalu	Governor-General Tofiga Vaevalu Falani	Tangira Falani	
Uganda	President Yoweri Museveni	Janet Museveni	
Ukraine	President Volodymyr Zelenskyy	Olena Zelenska	
United Arab Emirates	President Sheikh Mohamed bin Zayed Al Nahyan	Salama bint Hamdan Al Nahyan	
United Kingdom	King Charles III	Queen Camilla	
United States	President Donald Trump	Melania Trump	
Uruguay	President Luis Lacalle Pou	Lorena Ponce de León	
Uzbekistan	President Shavkat Mirziyoyev	Ziroat Mirziyoyeva	
Vanuatu	President Nikenike Vurobaravu	Rima Vurobaravu	
Vatican City	Sovereign Pope Leo XIV	Celibate	
Venezuela	President Nicolás Maduro (Note: Following the 2026 United States strikes in Venezuela, in which president Nicolás Maduro was captured by and taken to the United States, Delcy Rodríguez was appointed acting president by order of the Supreme Tribunal of Justice, having already served in a de facto capacity in the immediate aftermath of Maduro's capture. Both Rodríguez and Maduro have asserted that the latter remains the legal officeholder.)	Cilia Flores	
Vietnam	General Secretary of the Communist Party Tô Lâm	Ngô Phương Ly	
Yemen	President Rashad al-Alimi	?	
Zambia	President Hakainde Hichilema	Mutinta Hichilema	
Zimbabwe	President Emmerson Mnangagwa	Auxillia Mnangagwa	

== Other states ==
The following states are in free association with another UN member state.

State	Head of state	Spouse	Image
Cook Islands	King Charles III	Queen Camilla	
Cook Islands	King's Representative Tom Marsters	Tuaine d'Arorangi	
Niue	King Charles III	Queen Camilla	
Niue	Representative of the King Cindy Kiro	Richard Davies	

The following states control their territory and are recognised by at least one UN member state.

State	Head of state	Spouse	Image
Abkhazia	President Aslan Bzhania	—N/a	
Kosovo	President Vjosa Osmani	Prindon Sadriu	
Northern Cyprus	President Tufan Erhürman	Nilden Bektaş Erhürman	
Sahrawi Republic	General Secretary of the Polisario Front and President Brahim Ghali	—N/a	
Somaliland	President Abdirahman Mohamed Abdullahi	?	
South Ossetia	President Alan Gagloyev	?	
Taiwan	President Lai Ching-te	Wu Mei-ju	

Transnistria controls territory, but is not recognised by any UN member states.

State	Head of state	Spouse	Image
Transnistria	President Vadim Krasnoselsky	Svetlana Krasnoselskaya	

== See also ==
- List of heads of state by diplomatic precedence
- List of current foreign ministers
- List of current finance ministers
- List of current defence ministers
- List of current interior ministers
- List of current presidents of assembly
- List of current presidents
- List of current vice presidents
- Lists of office-holders
- List of current state leaders by date of assumption of office
- List of state leaders by year
- Lists of state leaders
- List of spouses of heads of government
- List of current permanent representatives to the United Nations
