= Mariam Mint Ahmed Aicha =

Mauritanian politician

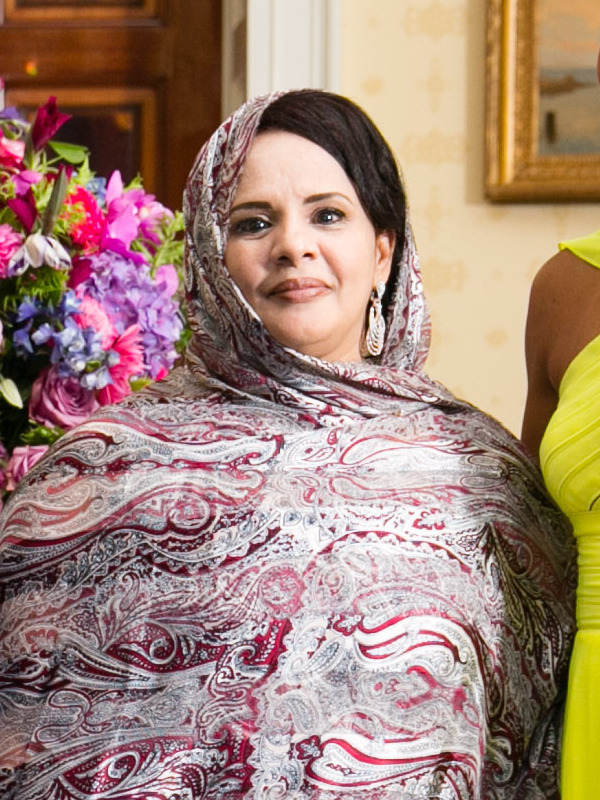

First Lady of Mauritania
- In role 5 August 2009 – 1 August 2019
- President: Mohamed Ould Abdel Aziz
- Preceded by: Khattou Mint El Boukhari
- Succeeded by: Mariem Mint Dah

First Lady of African Union
- In office 30 January 2014 – 30 January 2015
- President: Mohamed Ould Abdel Aziz
- Preceded by: Roman Tesfaye
- Succeeded by: Grace Mugabe

Personal details
- Born: Boutilimit
- Spouse: Mohamed Ould Abdel Aziz
- Occupation: Politician

Mariam Mint Ahmed Aicha is a Mauritanian politician. Her name is sometimes given as Mariam Mint Ahmed Aiche or Mariam bint Ahmed Aiche. From 1992 until 1994, she served as Minister of Women's Affairs; from 1994 until 1995 she was Secretary of Women's Affairs. She was born and raised in Boutilimit, Mauritania.

She is the president of the Association Mauritanienne pour la Promotion de la Famille (AMPF) which was founded in 1990, focused primarily sensitizing both the general population and the country’s political and religious leaders to the personal and economic benefits of family planning, and on promoting provision of proper sexual and reproductive health services.
