= Mariem Mint Dah =

First Lady of Mauritania since 2019 (born 1980)

- مريم منت الداه
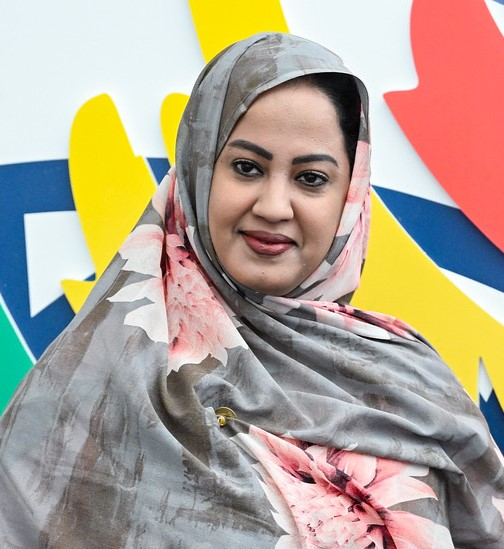
- Mint Dah in 2022

First Lady of Mauritania
- Assumed role 1 August 2019
- President: Mohamed Ould Ghazouani
- Preceded by: Mariam Mint Ahmed Aicha

Personal details
- Born: Mariem Mint Mohamed Fadel Ould Dah; 1980 (age 45–46) Atar, Adrar, Mauritania
- Spouse: Mohamed Ould Ghazouani
- Children: 3
- Parent: Mohamed Fadel Ould Dah (father)
- Education: Damascus University

Mariem Mint Mohamed Fadel Ould Dah (Hassaniyya: مريم منت محمد فاضل ولد الداه; born 1980), also known as Mariem Mint Dah (Hassaniyya: مريم منت الداه), is a Mauritanian dentist, commander in the Armed Forces of Mauritania and activist who has been the First Lady of the Islamic Republic of Mauritania since 2019 as the wife of President Mohamed Ould Ghazouani.

== Early life ==
Mint Dah was born in Atar, Adrar region, in 1980, belonging to an important Sufi family. Her father, Mohamed Fadel Ould Dah, was a respected former militant of the National Democratic Movement, a left-wing political party, and also served as Minister of Energy and Hydraulics and as an ambassador in several Arab countries. This led to Mint Dah living in several Arab countries, including Morocco, Iraq and Syria.

She started her dental medicine studies at Damascus University in 1999, graduating in 2004.

== Professional career ==
After graduation, she became a military doctor of the Armed Forces of Mauritania, where she served as a dentist. She met Ould Ghazouani at the army, marrying him later and opening her own dentist's office in Nouakchott, later joining the National Office of Occupational Medicine.

== Activism ==
After her husband was elected President in 2019, Mint Dah has continued to practice medicine while serving as First Lady, but refocusing it now with a social objective. She receives families who do not have the means for free consultations several times a year, and also participates in the organisation of events and the recruitment of foreign partners.

=== Women's rights ===
Mint Dah is active in the field of women's rights, focusing mainly on the fight against child marriage and girls' access to education. She has also voiced support to initiatives related to women's empowerment, cancer prevention, domestic violence, breaking the glass ceiling in the administrative sector, and family planning.

=== Disability rights ===
She founded the "World of Happy Children" association for autistic children after her own struggles with finding the required care for her son and meeting women with similar struggles in Mauritania, especially due to the difficulties in finding assistance, care and treatment for disabled children in Mauritania.

In 2018, she laid the first stone of the Zayed Centre, funded by the UAE, to which she donated her house. The centre was inaugurated in 2023 and it's dedicated to the support of autistic children, with it also planned to support children with trisomy and blindness. The centre welcomes 127 children, from 4 to 14 years old, divided into 6 classes. It has a playground, a swimming pool and a rehabilitation room. The Zayed Centre allows more than 350 free diagnoses to be carried out each year, with a team of about fifteen teachers, psychologists and specialised educators supervising the centre.

== Personal life ==
She has three children with Mohamed Ould Ghazouani. Her second son, Fadel Ould Ghazouani (born 2008), was diagnosed with a rare genetic disorder linked to autism. She doesn't like using the word disability for him, preferring instead to call him "different from others".

Mint Dah is a polyglot and can speak Arabic, French and English.

Despite her high-profile activities, Mint Dah maintains a discreet private life.
