= Gabriela Rodríguez =

Gabriela Rodríguez may refer to:

- Gabriela Rodríguez (producer), Venezuelan film producer
- Gabriela Rodríguez de Bukele, first lady of El Salvador
- Gabriela Rodríguez (sport shooter), Mexican sport shooter
- Gabriela Rodríguez (footballer), Colombian footballer
