= Left-wing politics in Mauritania =

History of left-wing movements in Mauritania

Left-wing politics appeared late in Mauritania compared to other Arab countries, but were politically and culturally influent. The main representative of the Mauritanian left has been the Kadihines or Toilers movement, with leftists in Mauritania being called either leftists, progressives or toilers.

The Kadihines appealed to the working classes and the marginalised of Mauritanian society and managed to get support among all ethnic groups of Mauritania, while fighting the influence of Nasserism, Ba'athism (which the movement considered as "racist" and "Arab supremacist") and Black nationalism. It used Marxist and Maoist theory to defend a socialist Mauritania that moved past the tribalist system the country was transitioning from towards an egalitarian society, promoting a patriotic left-wing nationalist vision to build a new Mauritania.

After achieving some of its demands through the regime of Mokhtar Ould Daddah, the Kadihines divided between those who cooperated with the ruling regimes of the country and those who remained in opposition (often extra-legally), which ended up leading to the decline of the left in Mauritania (also influenced by the loss of importance of ideology in Mauritanian politics and the rise of Islamism).

== Background ==
Left-wing politics reached the Mauritanian political arena in the late 1960s due to the return of Mauritanian students from abroad. These students mostly studied in Arab countries, in Senegal or in France, where they got in touch with Marxist, anti-colonialist and Pan-Arabist currents. However, the defeat of Arab forces in the Six-Day War led to a decline of the Arab nationalist current, popular in the country, represented by the Arab Nationalist Movement and heavily influenced by George Habash, and its further replacement with Marxist and Maoist theory.

This turn to the left also came as trade unions and student movements started radicalising towards Marxism, finding in it a solution to the crisis and to the ethnic problems that Mauritania was going through, uniting both Arab and Black movements.

The emergence of the Mauritanian left was triggered the violent answer of the Mauritanian authorities towards workers' protests, with the assassination of workers of the MIFERMA mining company in Zouérate in 1968 becoming a symbol of police brutality in Mauritania. Several factors have influenced the Mauritanian left and its growth: the growing Arab socialist wave that dominated most Arab countries in the 1950s, the decolonisation of the African continent, the Cold War between the Soviet-led Eastern Bloc and the US-dominated Western Bloc and the student-led 1968 protests, especially the May 68 in France.

== Birth of the Kadihines ==
It is considered that the first Mauritanian left-wing movement was born on 23 July 1968, when the majority of youth and student groups of various tendencies who were residing at that time outside Mauritania participated in a conference held by Mauritanian students in Damascus, Syria. This meeting later led to the creation of the first National Democratic Movement (MND) in the Takomadi village in Gorgol, southern Mauritania. The MND was explicitly Marxist, renouncing to pan-Arabism and preferring an internationalist outlook instead.

The Party of the Kadihines of Mauritania (PKM) was clandestinely founded on 1 October 1973 as the successor of the MND.
