= Charlotte Merz =

German judge (born 1960)

- Born: Charlotte Gass; 11 December 1960 (age 65); Saarland, West Germany
- Education: University of Bonn
- Occupation: Judge
- Years active: 1994–present
- Employer: Amtsgericht Arnsberg
- Known for: Spouse of the Chancellor of Germany (2025-)
- Political party: CDU
- Spouse: Friedrich Merz (m. 1981)
- Children: 3

Charlotte Merz (née Gass, born 11 December 1960) is a German judge and the director of the Amtsgericht (district court) in Arnsberg. She is also the wife of Friedrich Merz, the Chancellor of Germany, whom she met in 1980 and married in 1981. In spite of her husband's chancellery she has maintained her role, saying that she wants to go to work every day entirely normally, and has only made rare public appearances, such as at her husband's election by the Bundestag.

== Early life and education ==
Merz was born Charlotte Gass in 1960 in Saarland, Germany, where she grew up. She is the oldest of five siblings and comes from a family of lawyers; her father and grandfather were already lawyers and her aunt was a judge. After completing her Abitur, she followed family tradition by beginning her legal training in Bonn. According to Merz her ability to take her legal exams while looking after young children was due to her and her husband sharing parenting duties together, and she later cited this in response to claims her husband had outdated views on women.

== Career ==
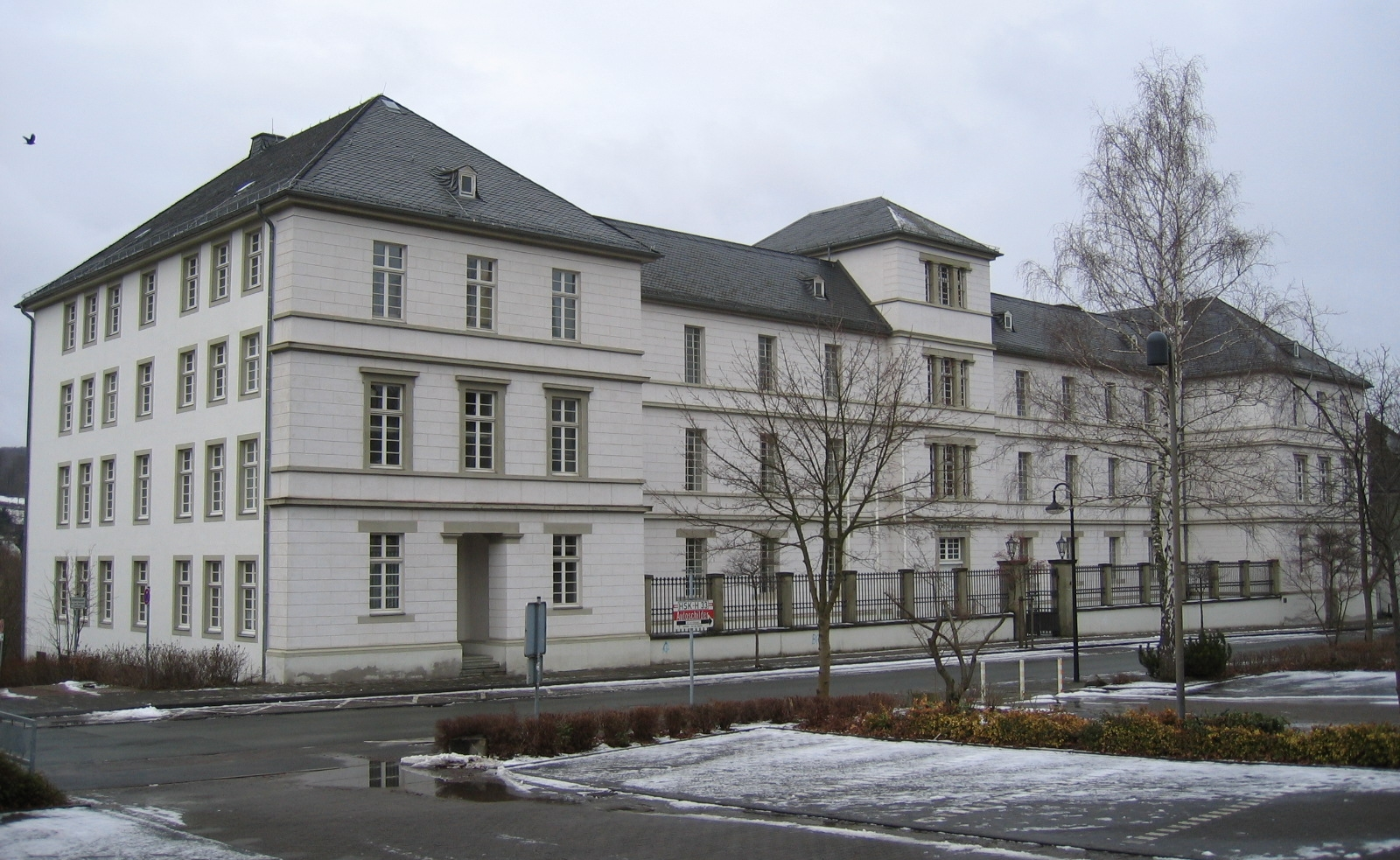
The district court (Amtsgericht) in Arnsberg, of which Merz is the leader

Since 1994, Merz has worked as a judge in Amtsgericht Arnsberg, the district court of Arnsberg. Her speciality is family law. She was made the director of the court in 2025. In 2005, she founded the Friedrich und Charlotte Merz Stiftung für Bildung und Ausbildung (English: Friedrich and Charlotte Merz Foundation for Education and Vocational Training) with her husband. The foundation, among other things, gives funding to local schools targeted at reducing the number of Sitzenbleiber (those who have to repeat their grade).

=== Husband's chancellery ===
In 2024 she became part of a scandal when she stopped comedian Lutz van der Horst from doing an interview with her husband for Heute-show on ZDF. The situation caused a stir and Hendrik Zörner, a spokesperson for the Deutscher Journalisten-Verbandes (German Journalists Association) said that the fact that Ms Merz wanted to educate journalists on etiquette was outrageous. Der Spiegel speculated that her increased appearance was a political tactic to win women's votes for her husband.

In an interview Merz gave in 2025, she stated she wanted to remain in her job even if her husband became Chancellor. Additionally, she said that she found references to her husband in court annoying, but is able to deal with them. In an interview she said "ich möchte ganz normal jeden Morgen zur Arbeit fahren" – "I want to go to work every morning completely like normal". Equally, she clarified that she will stay living in Arnsberg even when her husband is elsewhere as part of his office, denying that she would face boredom or isolation, and also that her husband calls her every day while away, even if for merely a few minutes.

On the day of her husband's election as Chancellor she made a rare public appearance with her daughters at the Bundestag. Friedrich Merz said as part of their visit that "necessary criticism be directed at me, not at my children, not at my family". In October 2025 she joined her husband in an official visit to Turkey where she was shown around by its first lady Emine Erdoğan. The media have noticed that she is more willing to publicly show affection for her husband, especially in comparison to previous chancellors such as Scholz and Merkel; they see this as more realistic and closer to the actions of US politicians. In February 2026, while on a cycling tour of Arnsberg with her husband, she fell off her bike and was taken to hospital as a precaution. However, her bicycle helmet protected her from serious injury and she was merely monitored to be cautious before being sent home soon after.

== Personal life ==
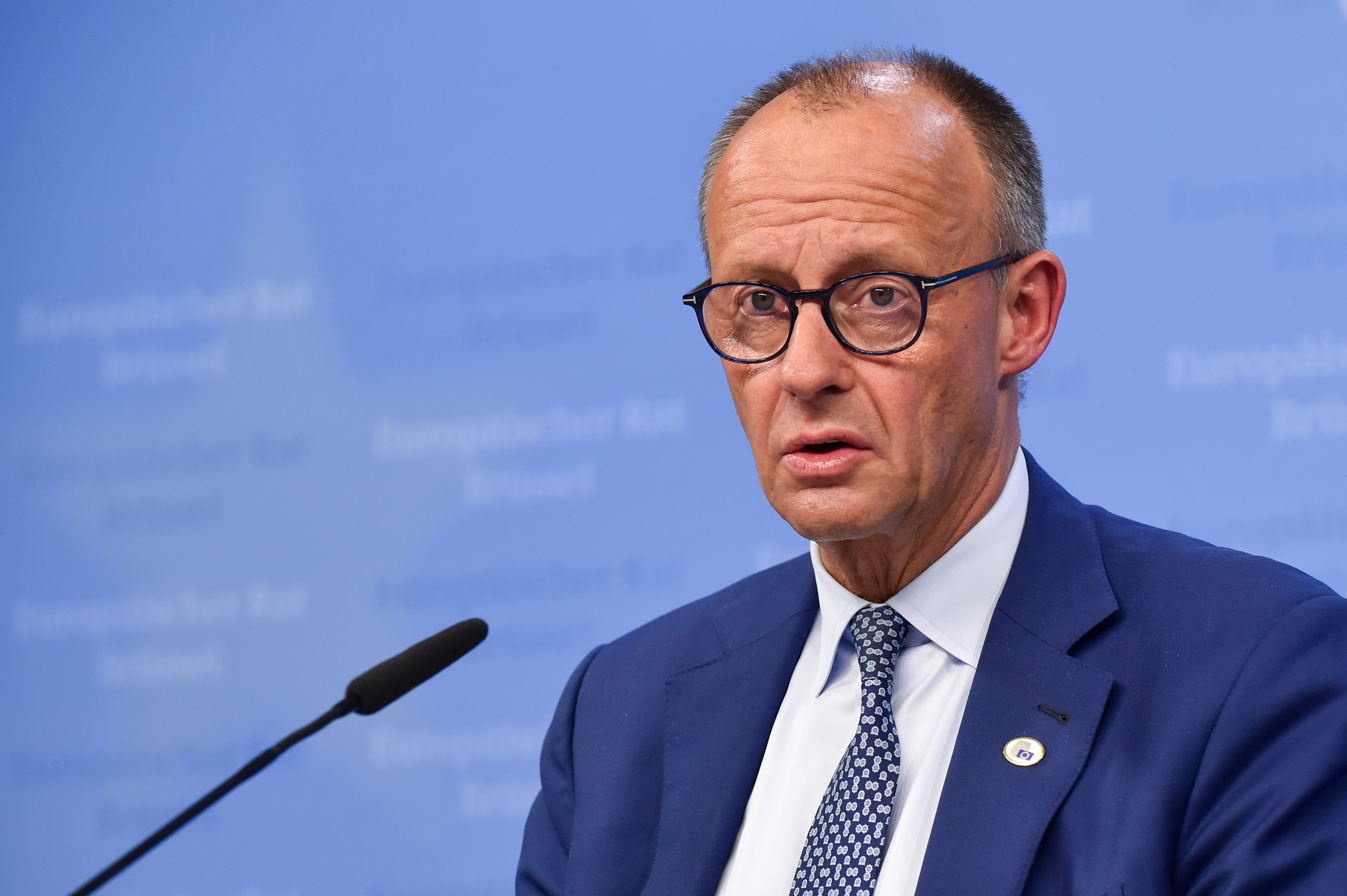
Friedrich Merz, her husband and Chancellor of Germany, in 2025

In 1980, Merz met Friedrich Merz at a graduation party in Bonn, and they married in June 1981. She recalled in an interview that it was love at first sight for her, but it took longer for him to love her back. The pair have three children; a son and two daughters named Carola and Constanze; the family lives in Arnsberg-Niedereimer. In an interview she said that as her children now have their own families, it is important for her and her husband to find each other again as a couple. Merz is a Protestant and member of the Church synodal executive of the Soest-Arnsberg Church district. Like her husband, she is a member of the CDU.

== See also ==
- Britta Ernst – wife of Olaf Scholz
- Joachim Sauer – husband of Angela Merkel
- Doris Schröder-Köpf – wife of Gerhard Schröder
