= Ambari Daroueche =

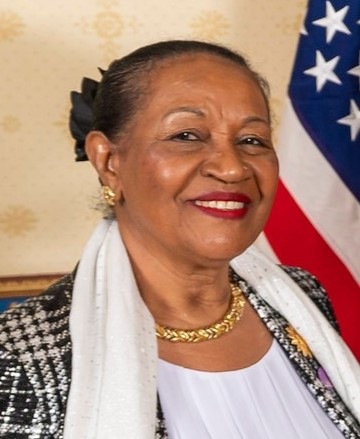
- Daroueche in 2022

First Lady of the Comoros
- Incumbent
- Assumed office 3 April 2019
- President: Azali Assoumani
- Preceded by: Wife of Moustadroine Abdou
- In office 26 May 2016 – 13 February 2019
- Preceded by: Hadidja Abubacarr
- Succeeded by: Wife of Moustadroine Abdou
- In office 26 May 2002 – 26 May 2006
- Preceded by: ?
- Succeeded by: Djoudi Hadjir
- In office 30 April 1999 – 21 January 2002
- Preceded by: ?
- Succeeded by: ?

Personal details
- Spouse: Azali Assoumani
- Children: Nour El Fath Azali; Loukman Azali; Yasser Azali; Ilham Azali

Ambari Daroueche, also Ambari Daroueche Azali, (born ?) is a Comorian public figure and women's rights activist. She currently serves as the First Lady of the Comoros since 2019 as the wife of President Azali Assoumani. She also served as first lady during President Assoumani's previous terms in office.

As the Comoros' first lady, Ambari Daroueche has focused on humanitarian issues, women's rights, and children's rights. In 2024, she addressed the need to include women in politics and democratic governance, telling the Crans Montana Foundation Forum, ""Research shows, moreover, that the status of women and the stability of nations are inextricably linked, and that societies that promote gender discrimination and allow oppressive norms to flourish are more likely to be unstable."

== See also ==
- Women in Comoros
