= First lady =

Honorary title of the wife of a president or head of state

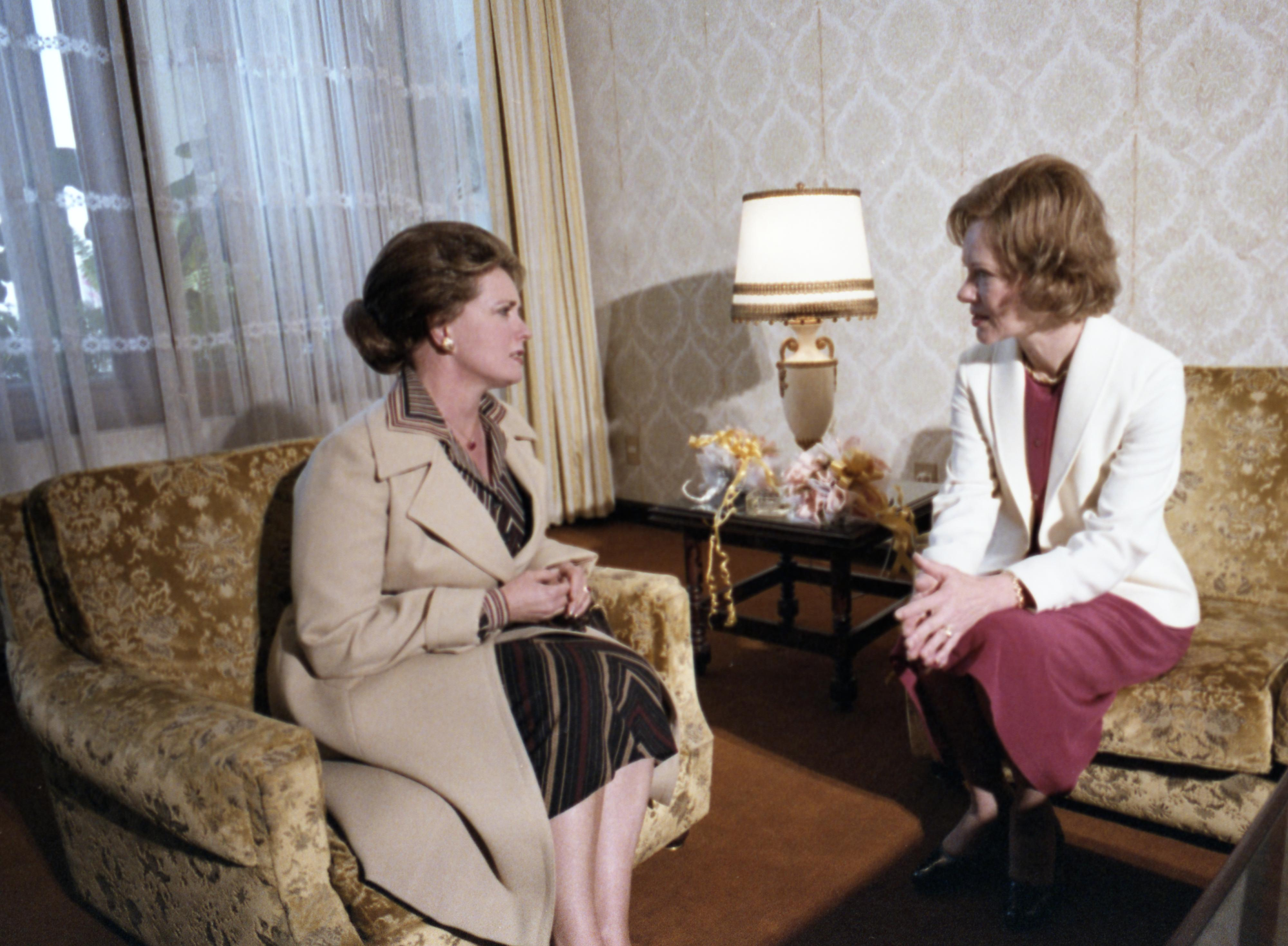
Egyptian first lady Jehan Sadat receiving American counterpart Rosalynn Carter in Cairo, March 8, 1979

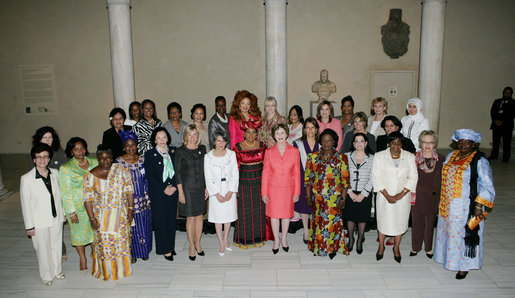
A group of first ladies assemble in the Metropolitan Museum of Art in New York City, September 22, 2008

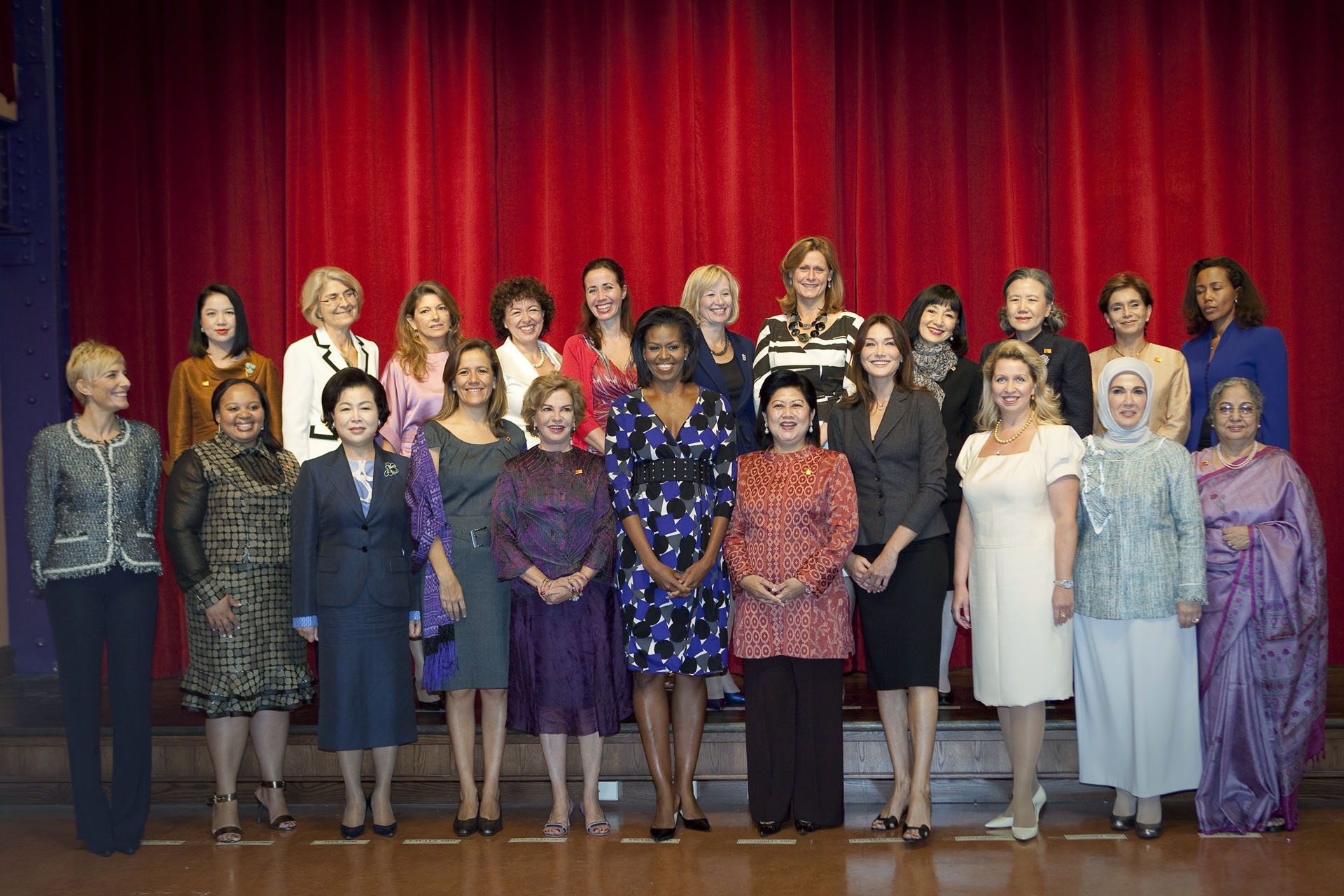
First ladies of the G20 in Pittsburgh, Pennsylvania, September 25, 2009

First Lady or First Gentleman is a title used in some countries, especially presidential republics, most often for the spouse of the head of state. Occasionally another relative may be designated in the role, especially for unmarried or widowed officeholders. The term may also be used for the spouses of mayors, governors, et cetera.

In Anglophone countries, the term is primarily associated with the United States, however the title has also occasionally been used to refer to the spouse of a head of government in some commonwealth countries. The traditional duties and social function of the role of First Lady in many ways echo the role of a queen consort in countries with a monarchy.

Outside of the US, the role is most often found in Latin American countries.

The term First Lady has also seen figurative use to describe a person seen to be at the top of her profession or craft, and is used in various Christian denominations to refer to the wife of a Christian pastor.

== History ==
It has been noted that the earliest use of the term "first lady" is in reference to person of a high ranking or outstanding person in their field, and that the term, as used to describe the spouse of the president of the United States, saw its first documented use in 1838 in reference to Martha Washington, who was never referred to as such during George Washington's time as president.

The first person to have been referred to as "first lady" on a regular basis during their time in the position was Harriet Lane, who was actually James Buchanan's niece, as Buchanan was a lifelong bachelor.

== Variations ==
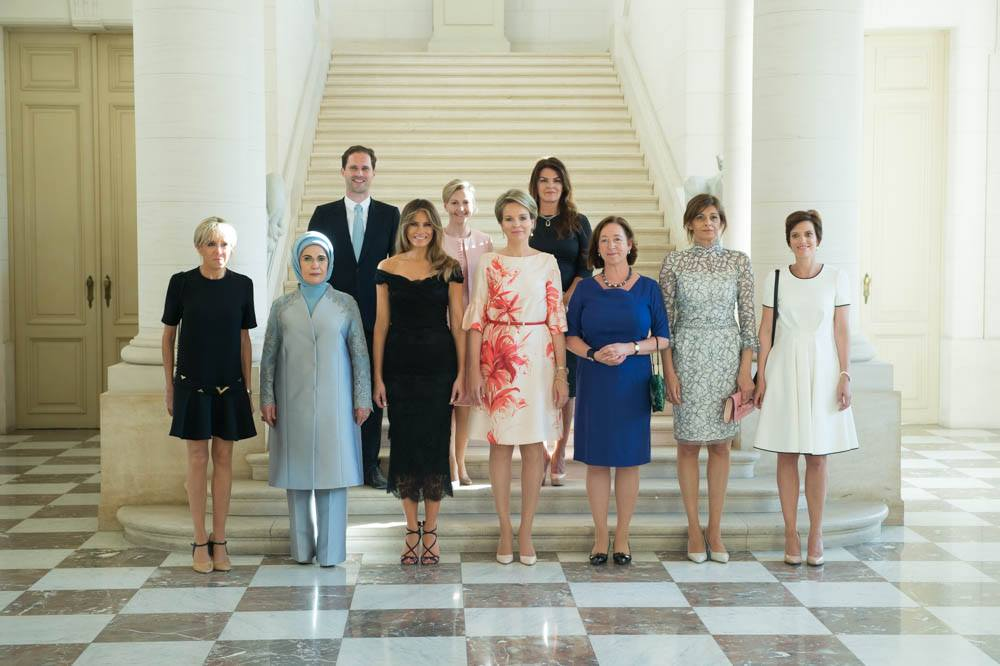
Queen Mathilde of Belgium meeting with the first ladies and first gentlemen of NATO members at the Royal Castle of Laeken on May 25, 2017

The male equivalent of the title in countries where the head of state's spouse has been a man, such as the Philippines or Malta, is first gentleman. "First gentleman" is also used in the United States for the male spouse of a mayor or governor.

First spouse and first partner, both rare variations of the title, can be used in either case where the spouse of a political leader is of any gender. This term is used to promote gender equality and gender neutrality.

In the United States, collectively, the president of the United States and his spouse are known as the first couple and, if they have children, they are usually referred to as the first family.

== Use in non-English speaking countries ==
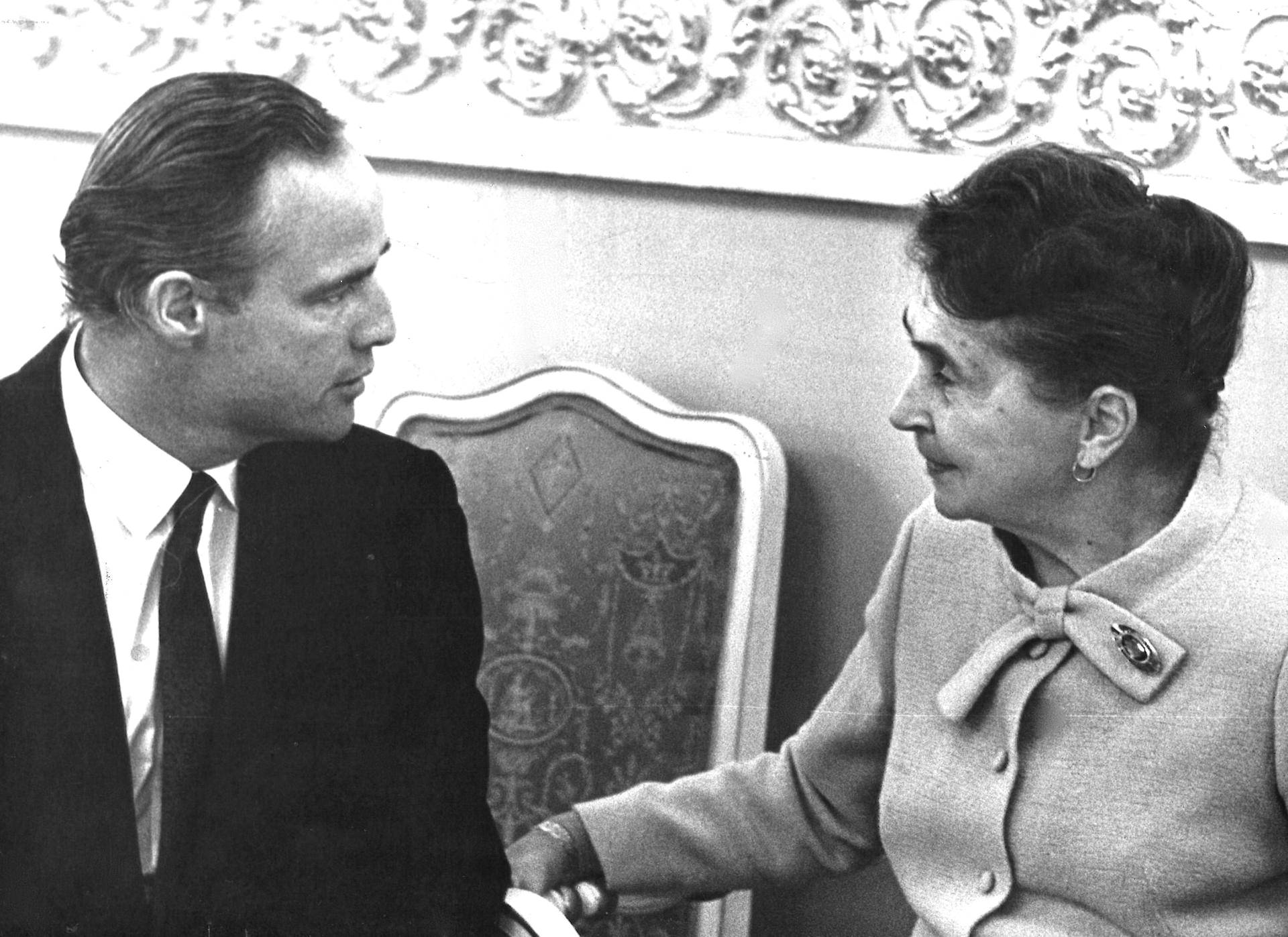
American actor Marlon Brando meeting the first lady of Finland, Mrs. Sylvi Kekkonen, in Helsinki, Finland in 1967

French-speaking countries have used the term première dame for first ladies, regardless of where the first lady is from. At least one article, published in 2017, used the term premier monsieur for first gentleman. For that particular article, it was used to discuss the possibility of Louis Aliot becoming first gentleman, should his domestic partner, Marine Le Pen, win that year's presidential election, however Emmanuel Macron defeated Le Pen in that year's election.

Portuguese-speaking countries have used the term primeira-dama or "Primeira Dama" for first ladies. The term is used regardless of where the person is from. The term primeiro-cavalheiro is used for first gentlemen.

In Spanish-speaking countries, the term primera dama is used for first ladies, regardless of the country the person is from. The term primer caballero has been used for first gentlemen.

Sinophone countries have used the term 第一夫人 (dìyī fūrén) as a term for first ladies, also without regards as to where the first lady is from.

=== Europe ===
==== Czech Republic ====
The term první dáma is used for wife of the president of the Czech Republic.

==== Poland ====
The term pierwsza dama (literal meaning: "first lady") is used by the wife of the current president of Poland.

==== Russia ====
Foreign press reports have referred to the wife of the Russian president as first lady. Russian first ladies have been less visible than their western counterparts due to historical reasons.

===== Soviet Union =====
It has been noted that Soviet leaders generally preferred to keep their wives and families out of the spotlight, resulting in "invisible first ladies". As a result, low-profile first ladies remain common in post-Soviet countries, due to the leaders of those countries having grown up during the Soviet era.

The wife of Mikhail Gorbachev, Raisa Gorbachev, has been referred to as a Soviet first lady.

==== Ukraine ====
The wife of the country's president has been referred to as перша леді (persha ledi) by the country's government. The term "first lady" has also been used by the government in English language news releases.

While some first ladies, like Maryna Poroshenko and Olena Zelenska, have played a role in social activism, other first ladies, like Lyudmila Yanukovych, have rarely taken part in public roles.

=== Asia ===
==== Armenia ====
The wife of the president of Armenia has been referred to as "Հայաստանի Առաջին տիկին" (Hayastani Arrajin tikin). The term "first lady" has also been used. The spouse of the current president, however, is only referred to as "հանրապետության նախագահի տիկին" (hanrapetut'yan nakhagahi tikin), or "wife of the president of Armenia".

==== India ====
First Lady of India or First Gentleman of India is the title given to the host of the Rashtrapati Bhavan, usually the spouse of the president of India. There are no official roles or duties assigned to the spouse. The Spouse generally attends official ceremonies, functions & accompanies the president on his or her official international tour.

==== Indonesia ====
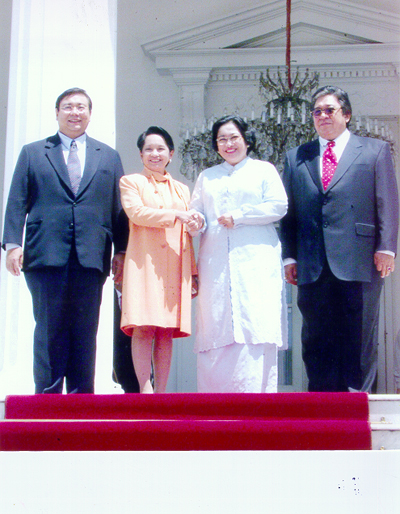
Indonesian first gentleman Taufiq Kiemas with Megawati Sukarnoputri receiving Philippine counterpart Jose Miguel Arroyo with Gloria Macapagal Arroyo in Jakarta, November 12, 2001

The term ibu negara (lady/mother of the state) and bapak negara (gentleman/father of the state) is used for wife of the president of Indonesia. The term is also used to refer to first ladies of other countries.

==== Iran ====
The position of Shahbanu existed before the 1979 revolution. No formal position of first lady (Persian: بانوی اول, romanized: Banuye Aval) currently exists in Iran. In September 2023, Jamileh Alamolhoda, the spouse of president Ebrahim Raisi, and foreign minister Hossein Amir-Abdollahian both stated that the wife of the supreme leader (at the time Mansoureh Khojasteh Bagherzadeh) effectively held the title of first lady. No official photograph existed of the supreme leader's wife.

==== Israel ====
While the title "first lady" (Hebrew: הגברת הראשונה) is not in official use in Hebrew, prime ministerial spouse Sara Netanyahu has used the title to refer to herself in English. This aroused controversy: since the president is first in the state order of precedence, outranking the prime minister, it is argued that the title of first lady "properly" belongs to the president's spouse. This view is followed by the office of the president, which uses the title "First Lady" to refer to the president's spouse in English.

==== Japan ====
In Japan, the term "Spouse of the Prime Minister" (Naikaku Souri Daijin Fujin (内閣総理大臣夫人), literally "the wife of the minister of the Comprehensive Administration of the Cabinet") is the title used for the wife of the prime minister of Japan.

==== Vietnam ====
Currently, the spouse of the President of Vietnam is called phu nhân chủ tịch nước (lit. 'wife of the state president'). The term đệ nhất phu nhân (lit: first lady) is also unofficially used by the press and on social media. The most prominent and highest position in Vietnam is the general secretary of the Communist Party of Vietnam and the spouse of the officeholder is considered the authentic first lady of Vietnam.

=== Central America ===
==== Costa Rica ====
The wife or husband of the president of Costa Rica is called Primera dama o Primer caballero de Costa Rica ("First Lady or First Gentleman of Costa Rica"). The term was first used under Federico Alberto Tinoco Granados. The office and officeholder rely on private donations, rather than on official funding from the government budget, to cover its expenses.

Marita Camacho Quirós, First Lady from 1962 to 1966 during the presidency of Francisco Orlich Bolmarcich, was 114 years and 102 days old when she died, making her the oldest First Lady in history.

== Non-spousal uses ==
In some situations, the title is bestowed upon a non-spouse.

=== Australia ===
Following the leadership spill which installed Julia Gillard as the first female prime minister of Australia on June 24, 2010, some news media referred to her partner, Tim Mathieson, as the "first bloke". The Australian Government has referred to Mathieson as Gillard's partner, and has also recognized him as a prime ministerial spouse.

=== Bolivia ===
Evo Morales, the former president of Bolivia, is single, so during his presidency his sister, Esther Morales, fulfilled the role of first lady.

=== Chile ===
Irina Karamanos, the domestic partner and girlfriend of Gabriel Boric, accepted the title of first lady despite both Karamanos and Boric's initial opposition to the position's existence. Karamanos said that taking on the role would involve "adapting it to the times." She suppressed the role at the end of 2022.

=== Ireland ===
During the first half of Bertie Ahern's term as Taoiseach, he was separated from his wife Miriam (née Kelly) and the role of first lady was filled by his then domestic partner, Celia Larkin.

=== Republic of Korea (South Korea) ===
During the last five years of Park Chung Hee's time as president, his daughter, Park Geun-hye, served as first lady following her mother, Yuk Young-soo's death. She has been regarded as a de facto first lady of South Korea by some modern sources.

=== Peru ===
Keiko Fujimori took over the duties of first lady at the age of 19, after the divorce of her father Alberto Fujimori and her mother Susana Higuchi.

=== Philippines ===
Elpidio Quirino was a widower when he assumed the presidency since his wife was killed during World War II, and as such, he appointed his daughter, Victoria Quirino-Gonzalez to serve as first lady and hostess of Malacañang Palace.

Benigno Aquino III had never married throughout his presidency, so Palace staff and occasionally, his sisters (primarily presidential sister Kris Aquino), take over duties traditionally reserved for the first lady, such as organising state dinners and entertaining guests.

Rodrigo Duterte had been previously married to Elizabeth Zimmerman until filing for an annulment in 2000, he has since been in a relationship with Honeylet Avanceña. When he was elected in 2016, he announced his daughter Sara would become the first lady, she would later decline the offer to focus on her duties as Mayor of Davao City. The position would go on to be vacant throughout his presidency, as Duterte had not designated someone to be the first lady.

=== United States ===
Thomas Jefferson was a widower by the time he took office as president, and his daughter, Martha Jefferson Randolph, who served as the lady of the president's house on occasion, has been recognized by the First Ladies National Historic Site as being a first lady, even though the White House website recognizes her mother, Martha Jefferson, as first lady. While Dolley Madison also served as hostess and Jefferson's escort on occasion, she is recognized as a spousal first lady by way of her husband's presidency following Jefferson.

Andrew Jackson's wife, Rachel Jackson, died before Jackson's presidency. Jackson's niece, Emily Donelson, carried out the duties of first lady until her death, and Jackson's daughter-in-law, Sarah Jackson, presided over the White House during the final months of Jackson's presidency. Both are recognized by the First Ladies National Historic Site as being first ladies, despite the White House website recognizing Jackson's wife as first lady.

James Buchanan was a lifelong "bachelor". During his time in office, his niece, Harriet Lane, served as "hostess". She is recognized as having acted in the capacity of a contemporary first lady during her uncle's time in office, and is listed among other spousal first ladies on the White House website.

==== Colorado ====
Jared Polis, who was elected as governor in 2018, is openly gay, and was in a long-term relationship with his partner, Marlon Reis, at the time of his election. Reis was referred to as "first man" by Polis during a speech on the night of his election, and members of Polis' campaign said that Reis will take on the title of "first gentleman". The pair subsequently married in 2021.

Not all non-married partners of Colorado governors are called first lady or first gentleman, as Robin Pringle was referred to by The Denver Post as John Hickenlooper's girlfriend prior to their marriage.

==== Puerto Rico ====
After taking office as Puerto Rico's first female governor, Governor Sila María Calderón appointed her two daughters, Sila María González Calderón and María Elena González Calderón, to serve as first ladies.

=== South Africa ===
When Nelson Mandela assumed the presidency in 1994, he was in the process of divorcing his wife Winnie Mandela. Instead, he appointed his two daughters, Zenani and Zindzi to both become first ladies from 1994 until 1998 when he appointed his third wife, Graça Machel to become first lady.

== Non-political uses ==
It has become commonplace in the United States for the title of "first lady" to be bestowed on women, as a term of endearment, who have proven themselves to be of exceptional talent or unique notoriety in non-political areas. The phrase is often, but not always, used when the person in question is either the wife or "female equivalent" of a well-known man (or men) in a similar field. For example, the term has been applied in the entertainment field to denote the "first lady of television" (Lucille Ball), the "first lady of song" (Ella Fitzgerald), the "first lady of country music" (Tammy Wynette, although Loretta Lynn was also known by the title), the "first lady of Star Trek" (actor/producer Majel Barrett), the "first lady of American soul" (Aretha Franklin), the "first lady of the Grand Ole Opry" (Loretta Lynn), "the first lady of American cinema" (Lillian Gish), the "first lady of the American stage" (Helen Hayes), and "the first lady of (American) football" (Norma Hunt).

The term has also been used to refer to wives of college and university presidents in some cases.

The term "first lady" is also used to denote a woman who occupies the foremost social position within a particular locality, in this sense being particularly popular in Africa, where the pre-eminent female noble in some chieftaincy hierarchies, such as those of the Yoruba people, is often referred to by the title.

In recent years, the term has also been used to refer to the wife of the pastor of a church, especially in predominantly black churches.

== See also ==
- List of spouses of heads of state
- List of spouses of heads of government
- List of first gentlemen in the United States
- Second lady
- Queen consort
