= Yuyito González =

Argentinian actress

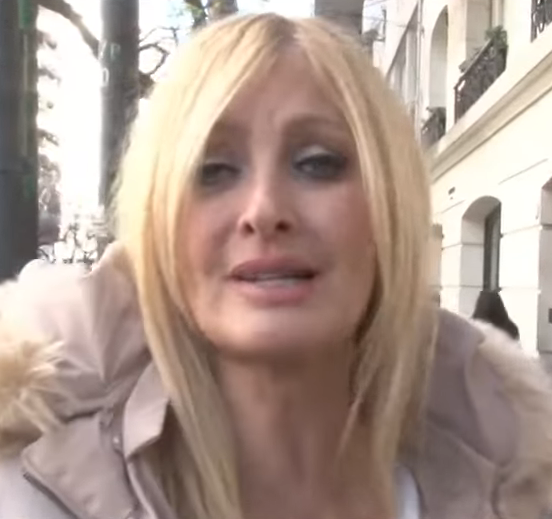
- Yuyito in 2025
- Born: Amalia Josefina Trombetta; 8 March 1960 (age 66); Buenos Aires, Argentina
- Occupations: Actress, showgirl, journalist, model
- Years active: 1983–present
- Spouse: César Di Aloy (div. 2000)
- Partner(s): Guillermo Coppola (c. 1986); Javier Milei (2024–2025)
- Children: 3

Amalia Josefina Trombetta (born 8 March 1960), better known as Yuyito González or simply Yuyito, is an Argentine actress, journalist, writer, former model and showgirl who was very successful in the 1980s.

== Biography ==
Born in 1960 in the Caballito neighborhood, she came from a middle-class home. She dropped out of school at age 16 without completing her studies. In 1982, she met Pepe Parada and Gerardo Sofovich at a restaurant, who facilitated her entry into Argentine show business. Her nickname Yuyito, with which she achieved numerous successes, was attributed to her role as a sexy gardener that she played on television in the program Don Mateo's Barbershop.

In 1995, she unwittingly inspired the salsa song "Talento de televisión" by musician Willie Colón and Venezuelan composer Amílcar Boscán. Her poor performance in Caribbean dance was the trigger that inspired the salsa hit, along with other limitations that were captured in the lyrics.

Since 2023, she has hosted a magazine show on a subscription television channel in Argentina.

== Personal life ==
She was linked to 1980s heartthrob Adrián Martel. She was also connected to then-Argentine president Carlos Menem.

She was in a relationship with Guillermo Coppola, with whom she had her first daughter, Bárbara Coppola (b. 1987), who became an architect. She was married until 2000 to César Di Aloy, her trainer, with whom she had twins Stefano and Brenda Di Aloy.

In 2005, at age 45, after a major personal crisis, she adopted the evangelical faith and left show business as an actress and showgirl. Decades later, after studying journalism at Universidad del Salvador, she began her career in journalism and television hosting.

From mid-2024 to April 2025, she was romantically linked to Argentine president Javier Milei.

== Professional career ==
=== Film ===
- 1985: Bloody Escape - With Mario Almada, Jorge Luke and Noé Murayama.
- 1986: The Motel and TV - With Carmen Barbieri, Guillermo Francella, Moria Casán, Luisa Albinoni, Adrián Martel and cast.
- 1987: Road to Hell - With Fernando Almada and Sergio Goyri.
- 1988: The Craziest Pilots in the World - With Emilio Disi, Gino Renni, Alberto Fernández de Rosa, Guillermo Francella, Tincho Zabala and cast.
- 1988: Relaxation Paradise (Massage House) - With Jorge Corona, Guillermo Francella and cast.
- 1988: Corona and His Women - With Jorge Corona, Silvia Peyrou, Beatriz Salomón and Lia Crucet.
- 1989: A Macho in the Cake Shop - With Alberto Rojas, Raúl Padilla and César Bono.
- 1990: Two Judicial Officers in Trouble - In Mexico.
- 1990: Better Than Nothing

=== Television ===
- 1983: Don Mateo's Barbershop (Channel 9).
- 1986: Hiperhumor (Channel 9).
- 1986-1987: Giant Saturdays (Catholic University of Chile Television).
- 1987: Porcel's Kittens and Mice (Channel 9 Libertad).
- 1989-1990: Sensational Super Saturday (Channel 9 Libertad).
- 1989-1992: Comedy Night (Venevisión).
- 1990: The Show of the Stars (Channel One).
- 1993: Loft
- 1996: Before Midnight (Channel 9 Libertad).
- 1996: Giant and You (Catholic University of Chile Television).
- 1997: Totally. (América 2).
- 2003: The Courtesans (Channel 13).
- 2005: There's No 2 Without 3 (Channel 9).
- 2006: Dancing for a Dream (Channel 13).
- 2009: Back to the 80's (Infomercial).
- 2013: Long Live Life
- 2015: Yuyito's House
- 2016: American Breakfast (América TV).
- 2019: The Fashion Cage (Ciudad Magazine).
- 2020: Who Wants to Be a Millionaire? (Telefe).
- 2020: The Infernal Wall (Telefe).
- 2021-2023: The Problem Show (El Nueve).
- 2023-2033: Start the Day (Channel Magazine).

=== Theater ===
- 1985: The Less Review - Director: Gerardo Sofovich with Moria Casán, Tristán, Mario Castiglione, Mario Sánchez and cast.
- 1986: Meta Moria in Mar del Plata - With Moria Casán, Mario Castiglione, Tristán, Mario Sánchez and cast.
- Argentina is Burning, with Romero Romerito, Luis Grillo and Laura Real.
- 1998: Armatetón - Tabarís Theater with Tristán, María Fernanda Callejón, Silvia Süller, Laura Panam Franco and cast.
- 1998: Gansoleros - Lido Theater in Mar del Plata, with Jorge Corona, Susana Romero, Tristán, Mónica Ayos and Sandra Smith.
- 2004: Live-in Waiter - La Sombrilla Theater in Villa Carlos Paz (Córdoba) with Gladys Florimonte, Carlos Rotundo and cast.
- 2004/2005: I Will Resist with Humor - ReFaSi Theater with Carlos Sánchez, Turco Salomón, Laura Oviedo, Jorge Troiani and cast.
- 2014: From Fame to Faith - 3 de Febrero Theater in Paraná (Entre Ríos) with Abigail Sosa.

=== Radio ===
- 2007: Hosted a program on Radio Rivadavia with Ricardo Guazzardi.
- 2010: Praying for Celebrities (Radio El Mundo)
- 2015: Yuyito's House - (www.veoradio.com.ar)
- 2016: Live Afternoon - radio 1450 - (Radio del Sol with Romero Romerito)

=== Print media ===
González, who did a total of five nude photoshoots for magazines, was on the cover of Playboy Mexico in November 1989.

=== Journalism ===
She studied journalism at Universidad del Salvador, where one of her teachers was Bernardo Neustadt.

=== Advertising ===
2014: Commercial for OLX sales website.

=== Discography ===
- 1988: What's Wrong with You? - CBS Label

=== Books ===
In December 2010, she launched an autobiographical book, From Fame to Faith, where she discusses her experiences in stardom and how she left that world to dedicate herself solely to Christianity.

In July 2012, she published her second book, 100 steps that led me to bankruptcy: Reflections that will help you avoid financial problems, and several agenda models aimed at women.

== Bibliography ==
- Blanco Pazos, Roberto; Raúl Clemente (1997). Dictionary of Argentine Film Actresses 1933-1997 (in Spanish) (1st ed.). Buenos Aires Ediciones Corregidor. p. 113. ISBN 950-05-1077-4.
