= List of heads of state by diplomatic precedence =

Protocol holds that a head of state takes precedence over all other officials, and that heads of state rank in the order that they took office. The following list contains the heads of state for all United Nations member states and non-member observer states.

Commonwealth realms, other than the United Kingdom, each have a local governor-general appointed to represent the monarch in the realm's government. Governors-general are frequently accorded the status and privileges of a head of state at diplomatic events when considered as representing their absentee monarch, but not as heads of state themselves. The co-princes of Andorra each have a representative as well. Hereditary Prince Alois is permanent representative for exercising the sovereign powers due to Liechtenstein Prince Hans-Adam II. They are included in the list and are highlighted in blue.

However, in many cases it is not this neutral principle but national rules of protocol that are acted upon, usually by an international event's host nation, as in many bilateral and even certain multilateral occasions. Various international organisations have a system for internal use. Even in the presence of one or more heads of state, certain occasions are governed by specific protocol, e.g. military. Thus in many cases precedence is given to monarchs over republican heads of state, mostly in monarchies; in some nations, the Pope (himself a monarchical head of state) ranks above secular heads of state, especially in Roman Catholic countries.

== States recognised by the United Nations ==
=== Current ===
Title	Name	Assumed office	Country
King	Carl XVI Gustaf	15 September 1973	Sweden
President (Note: Teodoro Obiang Nguema Mbasogo was titled President of the Supreme Military Council until 25 August 1979.)	Teodoro Obiang Nguema Mbasogo (Note: Teodoro Obiang Nguema Mbasogo is the nephew of the previous president, Francisco Macías Nguema.)	3 August 1979	Equatorial Guinea
President	Paul Biya (Note: Paul Biya was previously Prime Minister of Cameroon from 30 June 1975 – 6 November 1982.)	6 November 1982	Cameroon
Sultan	Hassanal Bolkiah	1 January 1984 (Note: Hassanal Bolkiah has been Sultan of Brunei since 5 October 1967, but Brunei was a protectorate of the United Kingdom until 1 January 1984.)	Brunei
President (Note: Yoweri Museveni was titled Chairman of the National Resistance Council until 29 January 1986.)	Yoweri Museveni	26 January 1986	Uganda
King	Mswati III	25 April 1986	Eswatini (Note: The country was the Kingdom of Swaziland before 2018.)
Queen Mother	Ntfombi	10 August 1983	Eswatini
Reigning Prince	Hans-Adam II (Note: Hans-Adam II was previously Regent from 26 August 1984 – 13 November 1989.) (Note: Hereditary Prince Alois has been Regent for Hans-Adam II since 15 August 2004.)	13 November 1989	Liechtenstein
President	Emomali Rahmon	20 November 1992	Tajikistan
President	Isaias Afwerki	24 May 1993 (Note: Isaias Afwerki has been the leader of Eritrea (initially titled Secretary-general of the Provisional Government) from 29 May 1991, but the country only became independent on 24 May 1993.)	Eritrea
President	Alexander Lukashenko	20 July 1994	Belarus
King	Letsie III (Note: Letsie III was previously King of Lesotho from 12 November 1990 – 25 January 1995.)	7 February 1996	Lesotho
President	Denis Sassou Nguesso (Note: Denis Sassou Nguesso was previously President of the People's Republic of the Congo (as the country was named then) from 8 February 1979 – 31 August 1992.)	25 October 1997	Republic of the Congo
King	Abdullah II	7 February 1999	Jordan
King (Note: The monarch was titled Emir until 14 February 2002.)	Sheikh Hamad bin Isa Al Khalifa	6 March 1999	Bahrain (Note: The country was the State of Bahrain before 2002.)
President	Ismaïl Omar Guelleh (Note: Ismaïl Omar Guelleh is the nephew of the previous president, Hassan Gouled Aptidon.)	8 May 1999	Djibouti
King	Mohammed VI	23 July 1999	Morocco
President	Paul Kagame	24 March 2000 (Note: Paul Kagame was Acting President of Rwanda until 22 April 2000.)	Rwanda
President	Ilham Aliyev (Note: Ilham Aliyev was previously Prime Minister of Azerbaijan from 4 August 2003 – 4 November 2003.) (Note: Ilham Aliyev is the son of the previous president, Heydar Aliyev.)	31 October 2003	Azerbaijan
Prince Regent	Hereditary Prince Alois	15 August 2004	Liechtenstein
King	Norodom Sihamoni	14 October 2004	Cambodia
President	Mahmoud Abbas	15 January 2005	Palestine
Sovereign Prince	Albert II (Note: Albert II was previously Regent from 31 March 2005 – 6 April 2005.)	6 April 2005	Monaco
King	Jigme Khesar Namgyel Wangchuck	9 December 2006	Bhutan
Co-President	Daniel Ortega (Note: Daniel Ortega was previously President of Nicaragua from 10 January 1985 – 25 April 1990 and then from 10 January 2007 – 18 February 2025.) (Note: Co-Presidents of Nicaragua Daniel Ortega and Rosario Murillo are married.)	10 January 2007	Nicaragua
(Governor-General)	Sir Patrick Allen	26 February 2009	Jamaica
President	Alassane Ouattara (Note: Alassane Ouattara was previously Prime Minister of Côte d'Ivoire from 7 November 1990 – 9 December 1993.)	4 December 2010	Ivory Coast
President	Salva Kiir	9 July 2011	South Sudan
King	Tupou VI (Note: Tupou VI – then titled Prince 'Ulukalala Lavaka Ata – was previously Prime Minister of Tonga from 3 January 2000 – 11 February 2006.)	18 March 2012	Tonga
President	Vladimir Putin (Note: Vladimir Putin was previously President of Russia from 31 December 1999 – 7 May 2008, and Prime Minister of Russia from 9 August 1999 – 7 May 2000 and from 8 May 2008 – 7 May 2012.)	7 May 2012	Russia
De jure President	Nicolás Maduro (Note: Following the 2026 United States strikes in Venezuela, in which president Nicolás Maduro was captured by and taken to the United States, Rodríguez was appointed acting president by order of the Supreme Tribunal of Justice, having already served in a de facto capacity in the immediate aftermath of Maduro's capture. Both Rodríguez and Maduro have asserted that the latter remains the legal officeholder.)	5 March 2013 (Note: Nicolás Maduro was Acting President of Venezuela until 19 April 2013, President of Venezuela from 19 April 2013 – 3 January 2026 and De jure President since 3 January 2026.The office of President of Venezuela has been in dispute between Delcy Rodríguez and Edmundo González of the Unitary Platform, since 3 January 2026.)	Venezuela
President	Xi Jinping	14 March 2013	China (Note: Chinese President is a ceremonial figurehead, while General Secretary of the Chinese Communist Party holds the highest authority of Paramount leader. The presidency has been held simultaneously by the General Secretary since 1993.)
King	Willem-Alexander	30 April 2013	Netherlands
(Governor-General)	Dame Cécile La Grenade	7 May 2013	Grenada
Emir	Sheikh Tamim bin Hamad Al Thani	25 June 2013	Qatar
King	Philippe	21 July 2013	Belgium
President	Abdel Fattah el-Sisi	8 June 2014	Egypt
King	Felipe VI	19 June 2014	Spain
(Governor-General)	Sir Rodney Williams	14 August 2014	Antigua and Barbuda
President	Recep Tayyip Erdoğan (Note: Recep Tayyip Erdoğan was previously Prime Minister of Turkey from 14 March 2003 – 28 August 2014.)	28 August 2014	Turkey
King	Salman	23 January 2015	Saudi Arabia
President	Sergio Mattarella	3 February 2015	Italy
Federal Councillor	Guy Parmelin	1 January 2016	Switzerland
President	Taneti Maamau	11 March 2016	Kiribati
President	Faustin-Archange Touadéra (Note: Faustin-Archange Touadéra was previously Prime Minister of the Central African Republic from 22 January 2008 – 17 January 2013.)	30 March 2016	Central African Republic
President	Azali Assoumani (Note: Azali Assoumani was previously President of the Comoros from 26 May 2001 – 26 May 2006.)	26 May 2016	Comoros
President	Shavkat Mirziyoyev (Note: Shavkat Mirziyoyev was Interim President until 14 December 2016 and was previously Prime Minister of Uzbekistan from 12 December 2003 – 14 December 2016.)	8 September 2016	Uzbekistan
King	Maha Vajiralongkorn	13 October 2016	Thailand (Note: Prem Tinsulanonda was Regent of Thailand from 13 October 2016 – 1 December 2016.)
President	Adama Barrow	19 January 2017	The Gambia
Federal President	Alexander Van der Bellen	26 January 2017	Austria
(Governor-General)	Sir Bob Dadae	28 February 2017	Papua New Guinea
Federal President	Frank-Walter Steinmeier	19 March 2017	Germany
President	Emmanuel Macron	14 May 2017	France
Co-Prince	Emmanuel Macron	14 May 2017	Andorra
O le Ao o le Malo	Tuimalealiʻifano Vaʻaletoʻa Sualauvi II	21 July 2017	Samoa
President	João Lourenço	26 September 2017	Angola (Note: The country was the People's Republic of Angola before 1992.)
Federal Councillor	Ignazio Cassis	1 November 2017	Switzerland
President	Emmerson Mnangagwa	24 November 2017	Zimbabwe
President	Cyril Ramaphosa	15 February 2018	South Africa
President	Julius Maada Bio (Note: Julis Maada Bio was previously Head of State of Sierra Leone (as Leader of the Supreme Council of State) from 16 January 1996 – 29 March 1996.)	4 April 2018	Sierra Leone
President of the Council of State	Miguel Díaz-Canel	19 April 2018	Cuba
Presidency Member	Željko Komšić	20 November 2018	Bosnia and Herzegovina
President	Salome Zourabichvili (Note: The office of Head of State of Georgia has been disputed between Salome Zourabichvili and Mikheil Kavelashvili, since 29 December 2024.)	16 December 2018	Georgia
Federal Councillor	Karin Keller-Sutter	1 January 2019	Switzerland
President	Félix Tshisekedi (Note: Félix Tshisekedi is the son of former Prime Minister Étienne Tshisekedi.)	24 January 2019	Democratic Republic of the Congo
President	Kassym-Jomart Tokayev	20 March 2019	Kazakhstan
President of the State Affairs Commission	Kim Jong-un	11 April 2019 (Note: Though Kim has held this office since 2016, the President of the Presidium of the Supreme People's Assembly was the head of state until the 14th State Affairs Commission was formed.)	North Korea
Emperor	Naruhito	1 May 2019	Japan
President	Volodymyr Zelenskyy	20 May 2019	Ukraine
President	Nayib Bukele	1 June 2019	El Salvador
President	Gitanas Nausėda	12 July 2019	Lithuania
President	Mohamed Ould Ghazouani	1 August 2019	Mauritania
President	Kaïs Saïed	23 October 2019	Tunisia
President	Abdelmadjid Tebboune (Note: Abdelmadjid Tebboune was previously Prime Minister of Algeria from 25 May 2017 – 15 August 2017.)	19 December 2019	Algeria
Sultan	Haitham bin Tariq (Note: Haitham bin Tariq is the cousin of the former Sultan Qaboos bin Said.)	11 January 2020	Oman
President	Zoran Milanović (Note: Zoran Milanović was previously Prime Minister of Croatia from 23 December 2011 – 22 January 2016.)	18 February 2020	Croatia
President	Évariste Ndayishimiye	18 June 2020	Burundi
President	Irfaan Ali	2 August 2020	Guyana
President	Luis Abinader	16 August 2020	Dominican Republic
President	Maia Sandu	24 December 2020	Moldova
President	Surangel Whipps Jr.	21 January 2021	Palau
President	Sadyr Japarov (Note: Sadyr Japarov was previously Acting Prime Minister of Kyrgyzstan from 6 October 2020 – 10 October 2020, Prime Minister of Kyrgyzstan from 10 October 2020 – 21 January 2021; and Acting President of Kyrgyzstan from 15 October 2020 – 14 November 2020. Japarov took a leave of absence from the office of Prime Minister from 14 November 2020 – 11 January 2021 to compete in the 2021 Kyrgyz presidential election; Artem Novikov acted for Japarov.)	28 January 2021	Kyrgyzstan
Chairman of the Presidential Council	Mohamed al-Menfi	15 March 2021	Libya
President	Samia Suluhu	17 March 2021	Tanzania
President	Thongloun Sisoulith (Note: Thongloun Sisoulith was previously Prime Minister of Laos from 20 April 2016 – 22 March 2021 and is the General Secretary of the People's Revolutionary Party since 15 January 2021.)	22 March 2021	Laos
President (Note: As President of the Transitional Military Council until 10 October 2022, and thereafter as Transitional President until 10 May 2024.)	Mahamat Déby Itno (Note: Mahamat Déby is the son of the previous President, Idriss Déby.)	20 April 2021	Chad
De facto President: 24 May 2021 – 28 May 2021; Interim President: 28 May 2021 – 8 July 2025; President: 8 July 2025 – present (Note: Assimi Goïta was Head of State of Mali (as Chairman of the National Committee for the Salvation of the People of Mali) from 19 August 2020 – 27 August 2020 and Acting Head of State of Mali from 27 August 2020 – 25 September 2020.)	Assimi Goïta	24 May 2021	Mali
(Governor-General)	Froyla Tzalam	27 May 2021	Belize
President	Isaac Herzog (Note: Isaac Herzog is the son of President Chaim Herzog.)	7 July 2021	Israel
Supreme Leader (unrecognized)	Hibatullah Akhundzada	15 August 2021	Afghanistan
President	Hakainde Hichilema	24 August 2021	Zambia
President (Note: Mamady Doumbouya was Head of State of Guinea (as Chairman of the National Committee of Reconciliation and Development of Guinea) from 5 September 2021 – 1 October 2021 and Interim President from 1 October 2021 – 17 January 2026.)	Mamady Doumbouya	5 September 2021	Guinea
President	Carlos Vila Nova	2 October 2021	São Tomé and Príncipe
(Governor-General)	Dame Cindy Kiro	21 October 2021	New Zealand
President	Janira Hopffer Almada (Note: José Maria Neves was previously Prime Minister of Cape Verde from 1 February 2001 – 22 April 2016.)	15 September 2026	Cape Verde
Presidency	Transitional Sovereignty Council	11 November 2021	Sudan
President	Vahagn Khachaturyan	13 March 2022	Armenia
President	Serdar Berdimuhamedow	19 March 2022	Turkmenistan
Chairman of the Presidential Leadership Council	Rashad al-Alimi	7 April 2022	Yemen
President	Mohammed bin Zayed Al Nahyan (Note: Mohamed bin Zayed is the brother of the previous President, Khalifa bin Zayed Al Nahyan.)	14 May 2022	United Arab Emirates
President	José Ramos-Horta (Note: José Ramos-Horta was previously Acting Prime Minister of Timor-Leste from 26 June 2006 – 10 July 2006, Prime Minister of Timor-Leste from 10 July 2006 – 19 May 2007, and President of Timor-Leste from 20 May 2007 – 11 February 2008 and from 17 April 2008 – 20 May 2012.)	20 May 2022	Timor-Leste
President	Hassan Sheikh Mohamud (Note: Hassan Sheikh Mohamud was previously President of Somalia from 16 September 2012 – 16 February 2017.)	23 May 2022	Somalia
President	Bongbong Marcos (Note: Bongbong Marcos is the son of former President and Prime Minister Ferdinand Marcos.)	30 June 2022	Philippines
President	Nikenike Vurobaravu	23 July 2022	Vanuatu
President	Bajram Begaj	24 July 2022	Albania
President	Droupadi Murmu	25 July 2022	India
King	Charles III	8 September 2022	Antigua and Barbuda
King	Charles III	8 September 2022	Australia
King	Charles III	8 September 2022	The Bahamas
King	Charles III	8 September 2022	Belize
King	Charles III	8 September 2022	Canada
King	Charles III	8 September 2022	Grenada
King	Charles III	8 September 2022	Jamaica
King	Charles III	8 September 2022	New Zealand
King	Charles III	8 September 2022	Papua New Guinea
King	Charles III	8 September 2022	Saint Kitts and Nevis
King	Charles III	8 September 2022	Saint Lucia
King	Charles III	8 September 2022	Saint Vincent and the Grenadines
King	Charles III	8 September 2022	Solomon Islands
King	Charles III	8 September 2022	Tuvalu
King	Charles III	8 September 2022	United Kingdom
President	William Ruto	13 September 2022	Kenya
Interim President (Note: As President of the Patriotic Movement for Safeguard and Restoration until 6 October 2022.)	Ibrahim Traoré	30 September 2022	Burkina Faso
Presidency	Željka Cvijanović; Denis Bećirović	16 November 2022	Bosnia and Herzegovina
President	Nataša Pirc Musar	23 December 2022	Slovenia
President	Luiz Inácio Lula da Silva (Note: Luiz Inácio Lula da Silva was previously President of Brazil from 1 January 2003 – 31 December 2010.)	1 January 2023	Brazil
Federal Councillor	Albert Rösti; Élisabeth Baume-Schneider	1 January 2023	Switzerland
(Governor-General)	Marcella Liburd	1 February 2023	Saint Kitts and Nevis
President	Nikos Christodoulides	28 February 2023	Cyprus
President	Petr Pavel	9 March 2023	Czech Republic
President	Ram Chandra Poudel	13 March 2023	Nepal
President	Christine Kangaloo	20 March 2023	Trinidad and Tobago
President	Wesley Simina	11 May 2023	Micronesia
President	Jakov Milatović	20 May 2023	Montenegro
President	Bola Tinubu	29 May 2023	Nigeria
President	Edgars Rinkēvičs	8 July 2023	Latvia
President (Note: As Chairman of the Committee for the Transition and Restoration of Institutions from 30 August 2023 until 2 May 2025 and as Transitional President de facto from 30 August 2023 and de jure from 4 September 2023 until 3 May 2025.)	Brice Oligui Nguema	30 August 2023	Gabon
(Governor General)	Cynthia A. Pratt	1 September 2023	The Bahamas
President	Tharman Shanmugaratnam	14 September 2023	Singapore
President	Sylvanie Burton	2 October 2023	Dominica
President	David Adeang	30 October 2023	Nauru
President	Mohamed Muizzu	17 November 2023	Maldives
President	Daniel Noboa	23 November 2023	Ecuador
(Personal Representative of the Episcopal Co-Prince)	Eduard Ibáñez	28 November 2023	Andorra
President	Javier Milei	10 December 2023	Argentina
Emir	Mishal Al-Ahmad Al-Jaber Al-Sabah	16 December 2023	Kuwait
Federal Councillor	Beat Jans	1 January 2024	Switzerland
President	Hilda Heine (Note: Hilda Heine was previously President of the Marshall Islands from 28 January 2016 – 13 January 2020.)	3 January 2024	Marshall Islands
King	Frederik X	14 January 2024	Denmark
President	Bernardo Arévalo	15 January 2024	Guatemala
President	Joseph Boakai	22 January 2024	Liberia
King	Ibrahim Iskandar	31 January 2024	Malaysia
President	Alexander Stubb	1 March 2024	Finland
President	Asif Ali Zardari (Note: Asif Ali Zardari was previously President of Pakistan from 9 September 2008 – 9 September 2013.)	10 March 2024	Pakistan
President	Bassirou Diomaye Faye	2 April 2024	Senegal
President	Myriam Spiteri Debono	4 April 2024	Malta
President	Gordana Siljanovska-Davkova	12 May 2024	North Macedonia
President	Peter Pellegrini (Note: Peter Pellegrini was previously Prime Minister of Slovakia from 22 March 2018 – 21 March 2020.)	15 June 2024	Slovakia
(Governor-General)	Sam Mostyn	1 July 2024	Australia
President	José Raúl Mulino	1 July 2024	Panama
(Governor-General)	David Tiva Kapu	7 July 2024	Solomon Islands
Acting President (Note: Min Aung Hlaing is Acting President of Myanmar due to his chairmanship of the National Defence and Security Council.)	Min Aung Hlaing	22 July 2024	Myanmar
President	Masoud Pezeshkian	28 July 2024	Iran
President	Halla Tómasdóttir	1 August 2024	Iceland
President	Anura Kumara Dissanayake	23 September 2024	Sri Lanka
President	Claudia Sheinbaum	1 October 2024	Mexico
President	Taye Atske Selassie	7 October 2024	Ethiopia
President	Prabowo Subianto	20 October 2024	Indonesia
President	Duma Boko	1 November 2024	Botswana
President	Naiqama Lalabalavu	12 November 2024	Fiji
(Personal Representative of the French Co-Prince)	Patrice Faure	20 November 2024	Andorra
President	Dharam Gokhool	6 December 2024	Mauritius
President (Note: Ahmed al-Sharaa was Head of State of Syria (as De facto Leader of Syria) from 8 December 2024 – 29 January 2025 and then President of Syria since 29 January 2025.)	Ahmed al-Sharaa	8 December 2024	Syria
President	Mikheil Kavelashvili (Note: The office of Head of State of Georgia has been disputed between Mikheil Kavelashvili and Salome Zourabichvili, since 29 December 2024.)	29 December 2024	Georgia
President	John Mahama (Note: John Mahama was previously President of Ghana from 24 July 2012 – 7 January 2017.)	7 January 2025	Ghana
President	Joseph Aoun	9 January 2025	Lebanon
President	Daniel Chapo	15 January 2025	Mozambique
President	Donald Trump (Note: Donald Trump was previously President of the United States from 20 January 2017 – 20 January 2021.)	20 January 2025	United States
Co-President	Rosario Murillo (Note: Co-Presidents of Nicaragua Daniel Ortega and Rosario Murillo are married.)	18 February 2025	Nicaragua
President	Yamandú Orsi	1 March 2025	Uruguay
President	Konstantinos Tasoulas	13 March 2025	Greece
President	Netumbo Nandi-Ndaitwah	21 March 2025	Namibia
President	Abdourahamane Tiani	26 March 2025	Niger
Federal Councillor	Martin Pfister	1 April 2025	Switzerland
President	Jean-Lucien Savi de Tové	3 May 2025	Togo
Pope	Leo XIV	8 May 2025	Holy See (Note: It is the Holy See and not the Vatican City state that maintains diplomatic relations with states and participates in international organisations. The Holy See and the Vatican City state are two separate and distinct entities. Foreign embassies are accredited to the Holy See, not to the Vatican City state, and it is the Holy See that establishes treaties and concordats with other sovereign entities. Also it is the Holy See that has United Nations Observer status not the Vatican City state.)
President	Nicușor Dan	26 May 2025	Romania
Co-Prince	Bishop Josep-Lluís Serrano Pentinat	31 May 2025	Andorra
President	Lee Jae Myung	4 June 2025	South Korea
President	Jennifer Geerlings-Simons	16 July 2025	Suriname
President	Karol Nawrocki	6 August 2025	Poland
Grand Duke	Guillaume V (Note: Guillaume V was previously Regent from 7 October 2024 – 3 October 2025.)	3 October 2025	Luxembourg
President	Peter Mutharika (Note: Peter Mutharika was previously President of Malawi from 31 May 2014 – 28 June 2020.) (Note: Peter Mutharika is the brother of President Bingu wa Mutharika.)	4 October 2025	Malawi
President	Michael Randrianirina (Note: Michael Randrianirina has also served as president of the Council of the Presidency for the Re-Foundation of the Republic since 17 October 2025.)	17 October 2025	Madagascar
President	Patrick Herminie	26 October 2025	Seychelles
President	Rodrigo Paz Pereira (Note: Rodrigo Paz Pereira is the son of President Jaime Paz Zamora.)	8 November 2025	Bolivia
President	Catherine Connolly	11 November 2025	Ireland
Transitional President	Horta Inta-A Na Man	27 November 2025	Guinea-Bissau
President	Jeffrey Bostic	30 November 2025	Barbados
(President)	Guy Parmelin (Note: Guy Parmelin was previously President of the Swiss Confederation from 1 January 2021 – 31 December 2021.)	1 January 2026	Switzerland
Acting President	Delcy Rodríguez (Note: Following the 2026 United States strikes in Venezuela, in which president Nicolás Maduro was captured by and taken to the United States, Rodríguez was appointed acting president by order of the Supreme Tribunal of Justice, having already served in a de facto capacity in the immediate aftermath of Maduro's capture. Both Rodríguez and Maduro have asserted that the latter remains the legal officeholder.) (Note: The office of President of Venezuela has been in dispute between Delcy Rodríguez and Edmundo González of the Unitary Platform, since 3 January 2026.)	3 January 2026	Venezuela
(Governor-General)	Stanley John	6 January 2026	Saint Vincent and the Grenadines
President	Iliana Iotova	23 January 2026	Bulgaria
President	Nasry Asfura	27 January 2026	Honduras
Acting President	Alix Didier Fils-Aimé (Note: Alix Didier Fils-Aimé is also Acting Prime Minister of Haiti since 10 November 2024.)	7 February 2026	Haiti
Supreme Leader	Mojtaba Khamenei	8 March 2026	Iran
President	António José Seguro	9 March 2026	Portugal
President	José Antonio Kast	11 March 2026	Chile
(Chairman of the Presidency)	Denis Bećirović (Note: Denis Bećirović was previously Chairman of the Presidency of Bosnia and Herzegovina from 16 March 2024 – 16 November 2024.)	16 March 2026	Bosnia and Herzegovina
President	Tô Lâm	7 April 2026	Vietnam
President	Nizar Amidi	11 April 2026	Iraq
President	Laura Fernández Delgado	8 May 2026	Costa Rica
President	Romuald Wadagni	24 May 2026	Benin
(Governor General)	Louise Arbour	8 June 2026	Canada
President	Keiko Fujimori	28 July 2026	Peru
(Acting Governor-General)	Felix Finisterre	1 August 2026	Saint Lucia
President	Abelardo de la Espriella	7 August 2026	Colombia
President	András Baka	19 August 2026	Hungary
President	Mirza Fakhrul Islam Alamgir	21 August 2026	Bangladesh
King	Haakon VIII (Note: Haakon VIII was Prince-Regent from 25 November 2003 – 12 April 2004, from 29 March 2005 – 7 June 2005, from 25 September – 31 October 2020, from 3 March – 22 April 2024, and from 18 – 28 August 2026.)	28 August 2026	Norway
Acting President	Janira Hopffer Almada	15 September 2026	Cape Verde
Acting President	Stojan Radenović	17 November 2026	Serbia
(Governor-General)	Temukisa Auina Penehuro Hauma	30 September 2026	Tuvalu
Captains Regent	Gerardo Giovagnoli	1 October 2026	San Marino
Captains Regent	William Casali	1 October 2026	San Marino
President	Justina Shiroka Pula	7 October 2026	Kosovo
President	Ülle Madise	12 October 2026	Estonia
President	Pedro Alliana	6 November 2026	Paraguay
Acting President	Sandagiin Byambatsogt	19 November 2026	Mongolia
Acting President	Aleksandar Čupić	19 November 2026	Serbia

== States with limited recognition ==
=== Current ===
Title	Name	Assumed office	Country
President	Brahim Ghali	12 July 2016	Sahrawi Arab Democratic Republic
President	Vadim Krasnoselsky	16 December 2016	Transnistria
President	Marat Kambolov	23 June 2026	South Ossetia
President	Lai Ching-te	20 May 2024	Republic of China (Taiwan)
President	Badra Gunba	19 November 2024 (Note: Badra Gunba was Acting President of Abkhazia until 2 April 2025.)	Abkhazia
President	Abdirahman Mohamed Abdullahi	12 December 2024	Somaliland
President	Tufan Erhürman (Note: Tufan Erhürman was Prime Minister of Northern Cyprus from 2 February 2018 – 22 May 2019.)	24 October 2025	Northern Cyprus
President	Marat Kambolov	23 June 2026	South Ossetia
President	Justina Shiroka Pula	7 October 2026	Kosovo

== Disputed governments ==
The following heads of state represent governments that are recognized as legitimate by at least one UN member state.

=== Current ===
Title	Name	Assumed office	Country
Chairman of the Supreme Political Council	Mahdi al-Mashat	25 April 2018	Yemen
President of the Coordination Council	Sviatlana Tsikhanouskaya	14 August 2020	Belarus
President of the National Assembly	Dinorah Figuera	5 January 2023	Venezuela

== See also ==
- List of current heads of state and government
- List of current state leaders by date of assumption of office
- Order of precedence
