= 2019 Omani general election =

← 2015	27 October 2019	2023 →
- All 86 seats in the Consultative Assembly
- Turnout: 49.02% (▼7.64pp)
Party	Vote %	Seats	+/–
Independents	100	86	+1
This lists parties that won seats. See the complete results below.
Chairman of the Consultative Assembly before	Chairman of the Consultative Assembly after
Khalid Al Mawali; Independent	Khalid Al Mawali; Independent

General elections were held in Oman on 27 October 2019. A total of 637 candidates contested the elections for the 86 seats in the Consultative Assembly. Because political parties were outlawed in Oman, all candidates ran as independents.

== Electoral system ==
The 86 members of the Consultative Assembly were elected from 25 two-member constituencies and 36 single member constituencies.

== Results ==
Party	Votes	%	Seats	+/–
Independents			86	+1
Total			86	+1
Total votes	349,680	–		
Registered voters/turnout	713,335	49.02		
Source: Times of Oman
