= 2011 Omani general election =

← 2007	15 October 2011	2015 →
- All 84 seats in the Consultative Assembly
- Turnout: 76.64% (▲13.97pp)
Party	Vote %	Seats	+/–
Independents	100	84	0
This lists parties that won seats. See the complete results below.
Chairman of the Consultative Assembly before	Chairman of the Consultative Assembly after
Ahmad al-Isa'i; Independent	Khalid Al Mawali; Independent

General elections was held in Oman on 15 October 2011 to elect the 84 members of the Consultative Assembly.

== Background ==
Following the self-immolation of Mohammed Bouazizi in Tunisia and the consequent 2010-2011 Tunisian uprising, protests around the Arab world for some form of democratic reforms. The Omani protests were crushed by the regime, although reforms were offered.

Sultan Qaboos bin Said then said that the Shura Council would get some legislative powers, while he also promised the initiation of programmes to create more jobs and to fight corruption.

== Voting registration ==
Following the protests, about 520,000 people registered for the election, which saw an increase of 388,000 from 2007.

== Candidates ==
According to the Oman News Agency, there were 1,300 candidates, 77 of whom were women, more than any previous election.

== Campaign ==
According to Al Jazeera voters sought an increase in salaries, more jobs and ending graft as part of a campaign against corruption.

== Election ==
Voting districts that have a population of 30,000 or more choose two MPs, while others have one MP. There were 105 polling stations. The voter turnout was 76%.
