= Lujaina Mohsin Darwish =

Omani politician

- لجينة محسن درويش
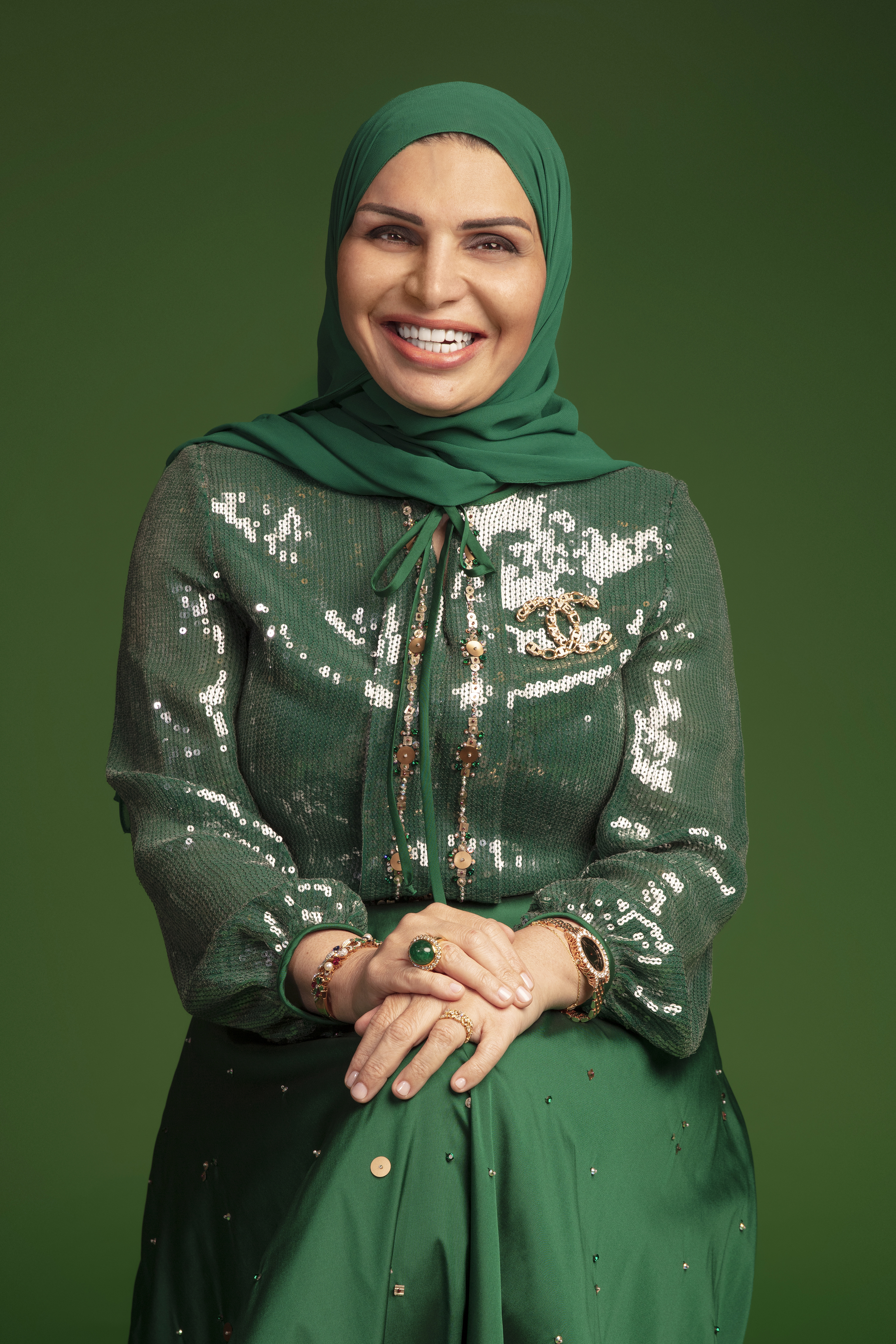
- Darwish in 2021

Member of the Consultative Assembly
- In office 2000–2007
- Constituency: Muscat

Member of the Council of State
- Incumbent
- Assumed office 2015

Personal details
- Born: 23 June 1969 (age 57)
- Education: Sultan Qaboos University
- Occupation: Businesswoman, politician

Lujaina Mohsin Haider Darwish (Arabic: لجينة محسن درويش, born 23 June 1969) is an Omani politician. Along with Rahila Al Riyami, she was one of the first two women to be directly elected to the Consultative Assembly in 2000. In 2015 she was appointed to the Council of State. Darwish is also the chairperson of ITICS at Mohsin Haider Darwish.

== Biography ==
Born in 1969, Darwish was the eldest of three daughters of the businessman Mohsin Haider Darwish; her sister Areej also became a businesswoman. She attended Sultan Qaboos University, where she earned a degree in English literature. She subsequently became a lecturer at the university, before joining the family business.

In 2000 she was one of fifteen female candidates in the general elections. Running in Muscat, she was one of two women elected. She was re-elected to the Assembly in 2003, but she did not seek re-election in the 2007 elections. During her time in the Shura Council she also became president of Sidab Football Club, the second woman in the Arab world to head a football club.

She later became deputy chair of Mohsin Haider Darwish LLC, and chair of its ITICS cluster. As a result, she regularly featured in lists of the most powerful Arab businesswomen published by Forbes.

In 2015 Darwish was appointed to the Council of State. In January 2025 she was appointed as the Honorary Consul of South Africa in Oman. She is also a board member of the Arab International Women's Forum.
