= Rahila Al Riyami =

Omani politician (died 2017)

Member of the Consultative Assembly
- In office 2000–2007
- Constituency: Bawshar

Member of the Council of State
- In office 2007–

Personal details
- Died: 5 February 2017

Rahila bint Amur Al Riyami (Arabic: رحيلة بنت عامر الريامي, died 5 February 2017) was an Omani politician. Along with Lujaina Mohsin Darwish, she was one of the first two Omani women to be directly elected to the Consultative Assembly in 2000.

== Biography ==
Al Riyami was a civil servant, serving as Director of Educational Planning at the Ministry of Education for 16 years. In 2000, she was one of fifteen female candidates in the general elections that year. Running in Bawshar, she was one of two women elected. She was re-elected to the Assembly in 2003. In 2007, she was appointed to the Council of State, serving as its head of Human Resources Development. She died in 2017
