= Hamoud bin Abdullah al-Harthi =

Sheikh Hamoud bin Abdullah al-Harthi
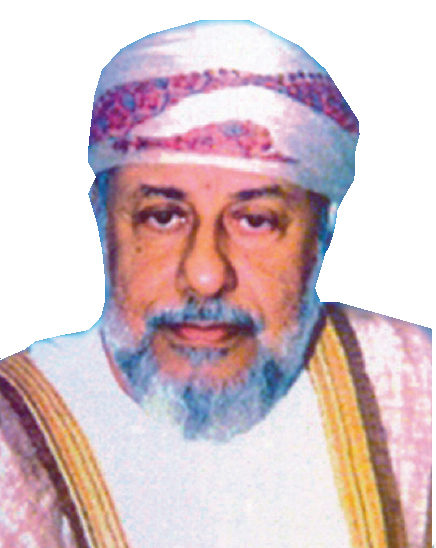

Chairman of the Council of State of Oman
- In office December 1997 – 1 March 2004
- Succeeded by: Yahya bin Mahfoudh al-Mantheri
- Monarch: Sultan Qaboos bin Said

Minister of Justice, Awqaf and Islamic Affairs
- In office 2 February 1991 – December 1997

Chairman of Chairman of Consultative Assembly
- In office 28 October 1983 – 1991
- Preceded by: Khalfan Nasir Al Wahaybi
- Succeeded by: Abdullah bin Ali al-Qatabi

Personal details
- Born: 1940 al-Mudayrib
- Died: March 1, 2004
- Education: Baghdad University

Sheikh Hamoud bin Abdullah al-Harthi was a prominent politician from Oman.

Al-Harthi was born about 1940 in al-Mudayrib in the al-Sharqiyah region. He was from Hirth tribe. He attended school in Zanzibar Sultanate and studied law in Cairo and Baghdad University. He later worked in Kuwait and then for the ministry of electricity and water in Abu Dhabi.

Al-Harthi returned to Oman in 1971 for government employment. First, he worked as the director of legal affairs in ministries and held several ministerial positions. He was appointed the chairman of the Consultative Assembly from 28 October 1983 to 1991.

Al-Harthi was appointed the Minister of Justice, Awqaf and Islamic Affairs in February 1991. He was then appointed the chairman of the Council of State of Oman in December 1997. He served in that role until his death on 1 March 2004.
