= 2003 Omani general election =

← 2000	4 October 2003	2007 →
- All 83 seats in the Consultative Assembly
Party	Vote %	Seats	+/–
Independents	100	83	0
This lists parties that won seats. See the complete results below.
Chairman of the Consultative Assembly before	Chairman of the Consultative Assembly after
Abdullah bin Ali al-Qatabi; Independent	Abdullah bin Ali al-Qatabi; Independent

General elections were held in Oman on 4 October 2003 for the mainly advisory Consultative Assembly. They were the first elections in Oman under universal suffrage. As political parties were banned, all candidates for the 83 seats ran as independents.

== Background ==
For the first time, all citizens aged over 21 were given the right to vote; only around 25% of the population had the right to vote in the previous elections in 2000.

== Campaign ==
A total of 506 candidates contested the elections, of which 15 were women. Fifteen female candidates contested the elections.

== Results ==
The two women elected in 2000 (Lujaina Mohsin Darwish and Rahila Al Riyami) were both re-elected.

Party	Seats
Independents	83
Total	83
Source: IFES
