= Areej =

Areej is a feminine given name of Arabic origin. Notable people with the name include:

== Given name ==
- Areej Al Hammadi (born 1986), Emirati football player
- Areej Chaudhary (born 1997), Pakistani actress
- Areej Mohsin Darwish (born 1971), Omani businesswoman and billionaire
- Areej Sabbagh-Khoury (born 1979), Palestinian sociologist
- Areej Mohyudin, Pakistani actress
- Areej Zarrouq, Sudanese film director
