= 2015 Omani general election =

- 25 October 2015
- All 85 seats in the Consultative Assembly
- Turnout: 56.66% (▼19.98pp)
Party	Vote %	Seats	+/–
Independents	100	85	+1
This lists parties that won seats. See the complete results below.
Chairman of the Consultative Assembly before	Chairman of the Consultative Assembly after
Khalid Al Mawali; Independent	Khalid Al Mawali; Independent

General elections for the Consultative Assembly were held in Oman on 25 October 2015.

== Background ==
After a series of protests, the competences of the Consultative Assembly were widened in 2011, giving members the possibility to propose and review laws.

== Electoral system ==
The 85 members of the Consultative Assembly were elected from 61 constituencies; 24 with two seats and 37 with one. No political parties were allowed to enter the election. In the case of a tie between candidates, the candidates would need to appear before the organising committee for a decision to be made. There were 611,906 registered voters, and electronic voting devices were used for those who had activated the system. Polling stations were open from 07:00 until 19:00 and voters received full paid leave in order to cast their votes.

== Campaign ==
Nominations for candidates were required to be submitted by 4 February 2015, and candidacies could be withdrawn until 25 August. Hopes were voiced for a higher representation of women in the Assembly, despite the number of female candidates being roughly half of that for the 2011 elections, in which only one woman was elected.

Although 674 candidates initially registered to run for the 85 seats (21 (3.1%) of which were women), the total number of candidates was later given as 590, with 20 women running. The campaigning process was closely watched by authorities, who warned candidates of harsh sanctions if they attempted to buy votes. Candidates used social media as an enhancement to conventional campaigning measures such as election posters.

== Results ==
Long queues formed in front of voting stations from early in the morning with the final voter turnout being 56.66%. A complete list of winners was released by the Minister of Interior late on Sunday evening. As in 2011, one woman was elected into the Assembly with Nemah bint Jamiel bin Farhan al-Busaidiya re-elected in the Seeb district of Muscat Governorate. Reactions to the election were positive with Khalid bin Hilal bin Saud al-Busaidi, chairman of the Main Election Committee, saying that voting went "smoothly without any hindrances".
