= List of chairmen of the Council of State of Oman =

The Council of State (Arabic: مجلس الدولة العماني Majlis ad-Dawla al-ʿUmāniyyi) is the upper house of the Council of Oman. It has 83 members all of whom are appointed by the Sultan. The other house is the Consultative Assembly (Majlis al-Shura).

This is a list of chairmen of the Council of State of Oman since December 1997, when the Council was established.

Name	Picture	Took office	Left office	Notes
Sheikh Hamoud bin Abdullah al-Harthi		December 1997	1 March 2004	
Yahya bin Mahfoudh al-Mantheri		8 March 2004	18 August 2020	
Sheikh Abdulmalik Al Khalili		18 August 2020	Present	
