= List of legislatures by country =

This is a list of legislatures by country. A "legislature" is the generic name for the national parliaments and congresses that act as a plenary general assembly of representatives and that have the power to legislate. All entities included in the list of sovereign states are included in this list.

== List of legislatures ==
=== Supranational legislatures ===
Organisation	Name of house(s)	House level	Term (years)	Seats
Andean Community	Andean Parliament	Unicameral		25
African Union	Pan-African Parliament	Unicameral	5	265
Arab League	Arab Parliament	Unicameral		80
Benelux	Benelux Parliament	Unicameral		49
Central American Integration System	Central American Parliament	Unicameral	Varies by country	126
Community of Latin American and Caribbean States	Latin American Parliament	Unicameral	5	276
European Union	European Parliament	Lower	5	705
European Union	Council of the European Union (Note: Not to be confused with the European Council nor with the Council of Europe. See https://www.coe.int/en/web/about-us/do-not-get-confused) (informally known as the Council of Ministers)	Upper	N/A	27
Mercosur	Mercosur Parliament	Unicameral	5	108

=== Legislatures of sovereign states (Member and observer states of the United Nations) ===
UN member or observer state	Overall name of legislature	Name of house(s)	House level	Term (years)	Seats
Afghanistan	Leadership Council of Afghanistan		Unicameral	No fixed term	Aprx. 30
Albania	Parliament of Albania		Unicameral	4	140
Algeria	Parliament of Algeria	People's National Assembly	Lower	5	407
Algeria	Parliament of Algeria	Council of the Nation	Upper	6	174
Andorra	General Council of Andorra		Unicameral	4	28
Angola	National Assembly (Note: Portuguese: Assembleia Nacional)		Unicameral	4	220
Antigua and Barbuda	Parliament of Antigua and Barbuda (Note: The head of state is a constituent part of the parliament too.)	House of Representatives	Lower	5	17
Antigua and Barbuda	Parliament of Antigua and Barbuda	Senate	Upper	5	17
Argentina	National Congress of Argentina	Chamber of Deputies of the Nation	Lower	4	257
Argentina	National Congress of Argentina	Honorable Senate of the Nation	Upper	6	72
Armenia	National Assembly of Armenia		Unicameral	5	105
Australia	Parliament of Australia	House of Representatives	Lower	3	150
Australia	Parliament of Australia	Senate	Upper	6 (for states) 3 (for territories) unless earlier elections called	76
Austria	Austrian Parliament	National Council	Lower	5	183
Austria	Austrian Parliament	Federal Council	Upper	5 and 6	60
Azerbaijan	National Assembly		Unicameral	5	125
Bahamas	Parliament of the Bahamas	House of Assembly	Lower	5	39
Bahamas	Parliament of the Bahamas	Senate	Upper	5	16
Bahrain	National Assembly	Council of Representatives	Lower	4	40
Bahrain	National Assembly	Consultative Council	Upper	4	40
Bangladesh	Jatiya Sangsad		Unicameral	5	350
Barbados	Parliament of Barbados	House of Assembly	Lower	5	30
Barbados	Parliament of Barbados	Senate	Upper	5	21
Belarus	National Assembly of the Republic of Belarus	House of Representatives	Lower	5	110
Belarus	National Assembly of the Republic of Belarus	Council of the Republic	Upper	5	64
Belgium	Federal Parliament	Chamber of Representatives	Lower	5	150
Belgium	Federal Parliament	Senate (Note: French: Sénat)	Upper	5	60
Belize	National Assembly	House of Representatives	Lower	5	31
Belize	National Assembly	Senate	Upper	5	12
Benin	Beninese Parliament	National Assembly (Note: French: Assemblée nationale)	Lower	7	109
Benin	Beninese Parliament	Senate	Upper	7	25
Bhutan	Parliament of Bhutan (Note: The native name is also used in English.)	National Assembly	Lower	5	47
Bhutan	Parliament of Bhutan	National Council	Upper	4	25
Bolivia	Plurinational Legislative Assembly	Chamber of Deputies	Lower	5	130
Bolivia	Plurinational Legislative Assembly	Chamber of Senators	Upper	5	36
Bosnia and Herzegovina	Parliamentary Assembly	House of Representatives	Lower	4	42
Bosnia and Herzegovina	Parliamentary Assembly	House of Peoples	Upper	4	15
Botswana	Parliament of Botswana	National Assembly	Unicameral	5	69
Brazil	National Congress	Chamber of Deputies	Lower	4	513
Brazil	National Congress	Federal Senate	Upper	8	81
Brunei	Legislative Council		Unicameral	no timeframe	34
Bulgaria	National Assembly		Unicameral	4	240
Burkina Faso	National Assembly		Unicameral	5	127
Burundi	Parliament	National Assembly	Lower	5	121
Burundi	Parliament	Senate	Upper	5	43
Cambodia	Parliament	National Assembly	Lower	5	123
Cambodia	Parliament	Senate	Upper	6	61
Cameroon	Parliament	National Assembly	Lower	5	180
Cameroon	Parliament	Senate	Upper	5	100
Canada	Parliament	House of Commons	Lower	4 years, unless elections are called earlier	343
Canada	Parliament	Senate	Upper	Until age 75, or resignation.	105
Cape Verde	National Assembly		Unicameral	5	72
Central African Republic	National Assembly		Unicameral	7	140
Chad	National Assembly		Unicameral	4	188
Chile	National Congress	Chamber of Deputies	Lower	4	155
Chile	National Congress	Senate of the Republic	Upper	8	50
China	National People's Congress		Unicameral	5	2,980
Colombia	Congress	Chamber of Representatives (Note: Spanish: Cámara de Representantes)	Lower	4	166
Colombia	Congress	Senate	Upper	4	102
Comoros	Assembly of the Union		Unicameral	5	33
Congo	Parliament	National Assembly	Lower	5	151
Congo	Parliament	Senate	Upper	5	52
Costa Rica	Legislative Assembly		Unicameral	4	57
Croatia	Croatian Parliament (Note: Croatian: Sabor)		Unicameral	4	151
Cuba	National Assembly of People's Power		Unicameral	5	605
Cyprus	House of Representatives		Unicameral	5	56
Czech Republic	Parliament of the Czech Republic	Chamber of Deputies	Lower	4	200
Czech Republic	Parliament of the Czech Republic	Senate	Upper	6	81
Denmark	Folketing		Unicameral	4	179
Djibouti	National Assembly		Unicameral	5	65
Dominica	House of Assembly		Unicameral	5	32
Dominican Republic	National Congress	Chamber of Deputies	Lower	4	190
Dominican Republic	National Congress	Senate	Upper	4	32
DR Congo	Parliament	National Assembly	Lower	5	500
DR Congo	Parliament	Senate	Upper	5	108
East Timor	National Parliament		Unicameral	5	65
Ecuador	National Assembly		Unicameral	4	151
Egypt	Parliament	Senate	Upper	5	300
Egypt	Parliament	House of Representatives	Lower	5	596
El Salvador	Legislative Assembly		Unicameral	3	60
Equatorial Guinea	Parliament	Chamber of Deputies	Lower	5	100
Equatorial Guinea	Parliament	Senate	Upper		70
Eritrea	National Assembly		Unicameral	5	104
Estonia	Riigikogu		Unicameral	4	101
Eswatini	Parliament	House of Assembly	Lower	5	55
Eswatini	Parliament	Senate	Upper	5	30
Ethiopia	Parliament	House of Peoples' Representatives	Lower	5	547
Ethiopia	Parliament	House of Federation	Upper	5	112
Federated States of Micronesia	Congress		Unicameral	4	14
Fiji	Parliament		Unicameral	4	50
Finland	Parliament		Unicameral	4	200
France	Parliament	National Assembly	Lower	5	577
France	Parliament	Senate	Upper	6	348
Gabon	Parliament	National Assembly	Lower	5	121
Gabon	Parliament	Senate	Upper	6	102
Gambia	National Assembly		Unicameral	5	58
Georgia	Parliament of Georgia		Unicameral	4	150
Germany	Bundestag		Lower	4	630
Germany	German Bundesrat		Upper	Dependent on individual state elections	69
Ghana	Parliament		Unicameral	4	276
Greece	Hellenic Parliament		Unicameral	4	300
Grenada	Parliament	House of Representatives	Lower	5	15
Grenada	Parliament	Senate	Upper	5	13
Guatemala	Congress of the Republic		Unicameral	4	160
Guinea	National Assembly		Unicameral	5	114
Guinea-Bissau	National People's Assembly		Unicameral	4	100
Guyana	National Assembly		Unicameral	5	65
Haiti	National Assembly	Chamber of Deputies	Lower	4	119
Haiti	National Assembly	Senate	Upper	6	30
Honduras	National Congress		Unicameral	4	128
Hungary	National Assembly		Unicameral	4	199
Iceland	Althing		Unicameral	4	63
India	Parliament	Lok Sabha	Lower	5	543
India	Parliament	Rajya Sabha	Upper	6	245
Indonesia	People's Consultative Assembly	People's Representative Council	Lower	5	575
Indonesia	People's Consultative Assembly	Regional Representative Council	Upper	5	136
Iran	Islamic Consultative Assembly		Unicameral	4	290
Iraq	Parliament of Iraq	Council of Representatives of Iraq	Lower	4	329
Iraq	Parliament of Iraq	Federation Council	Upper	N/A	N/A
Ireland	Oireachtas	President of Ireland	President-in-Parliament	7	N/A
Ireland	Oireachtas	Dáil Éireann	Lower	5	174
Ireland	Oireachtas	Seanad Éireann	Upper	5	60
Israel	Knesset		Unicameral	4	120
Italy	Parliament	Chamber of Deputies	Lower	5	400
Italy	Parliament	Senate of the Republic	Upper	5	200
Ivory Coast	Parliament	National Assembly	Lower	5	255
Ivory Coast	Parliament	Senate	Upper	5	120
Jamaica	Parliament	House of Representatives	Lower	5	63
Jamaica	Parliament	Senate	Upper	5	21
Japan	Diet	House of Representatives	Lower	4	465
Japan	Diet	Senate	Upper	6	248
Jordan	Parliament	House of Representatives	Lower	4	138
Jordan	Parliament	Senate	Upper	6	75
Kazakhstan	Kurultai		Unicameral	5	145
Kenya	Parliament	National Assembly	Lower	5	349
Kenya	Parliament	Senate	Upper	5	67
Kiribati	House of Assembly		Unicameral	4	46
Kuwait	National Assembly		Unicameral	4	50
Kyrgyzstan	Supreme Council		Unicameral	5	90
Laos	National Assembly		Unicameral	5	115
Latvia	Saeima		Unicameral	4	100
Lebanon	Parliament		Unicameral	4	128
Lesotho	Parliament	National Assembly	Lower	5	120
Lesotho	Parliament	Senate	Upper	5	33
Liberia	Legislature	House of Representatives	Lower	6	73
Liberia	Legislature	Senate	Upper	9	30
Libya	House of Representatives		Unicameral		200
Liechtenstein	Landtag		Unicameral	4	25
Lithuania	Seimas		Unicameral	4	141
Luxembourg	Chamber of Deputies		Unicameral	5	60
Madagascar	Parliament	National Assembly	Lower	5	160
Madagascar	Parliament	Senate	Upper	5	33
Malawi	National Assembly		Unicameral	5	193
Malaysia	Parliament	Dewan Rakyat (Note: Literally, "People's Hall")	Lower	5	222
Malaysia	Parliament	Dewan Negara (Note: Literally, "Nation's Hall")	Upper	3	70
Maldives	People's Majlis		Unicameral	5	85
Mali	National Assembly		Unicameral	4	160
Malta	Parliament	President of Malta	President-in-Parliament	5	N/A
Malta	Parliament	House of Representatives	Unicameral	5	69
Marshall Islands	Legislature		Unicameral	4	33
Mauritania	Parliament	National Assembly	Unicameral	5	176
Mauritius	National Assembly		Unicameral	5	65
Mexico	Congress of the Union	Chamber of Deputies	Lower	3	500
Mexico	Congress of the Union	Chamber of Senators	Upper	6	128
Moldova	Parliament		Unicameral	4	101
Monaco	National Council		Unicameral	5	24
Mongolia	State Great Khural		Unicameral	4	126
Montenegro	Assembly		Unicameral	4	81
Morocco	Parliament	House of Representatives	Lower	5	395
Morocco	Parliament	House of Councillors	Upper	6	270
Mozambique	Assembly of the Republic		Unicameral	5	250
Myanmar (Burma)	Pyidaungsu Hluttaw	Pyithu Hluttaw	Lower	5	440
Myanmar (Burma)	Pyidaungsu Hluttaw	Amyotha Hluttaw	Upper	5	224
Namibia	Parliament	National Assembly	Lower	5	104
Namibia	Parliament	National Council	Upper	6	26
Nauru	Parliament		Unicameral	3	19
Nepal	Federal Parliament	House of Representatives	Lower	5	275
Nepal	Federal Parliament	National Assembly	Upper	6	59
Netherlands	States General	House of Representatives	Lower	4	150
Netherlands	States General	Senate	Upper	4	75
New Zealand	Parliament	House of Representatives	Unicameral	3	120
Nicaragua	National Assembly		Unicameral	5	90
Niger	National Assembly		Unicameral	5	171
Nigeria	National Assembly	House of Representatives	Lower	4	360
Nigeria	National Assembly	Senate	Upper	4	109
North Korea	Supreme People's Assembly		Unicameral	5	687
North Macedonia	Assembly		Unicameral	4	120
Norway	Storting		Unicameral	4	169
Oman	Council of Oman	Consultative Assembly	Lower	4	84
Oman	Council of Oman	Council of State	Upper	4	85
Pakistan	Parliament of Pakistan	National Assembly of Pakistan	Lower	5	336
Pakistan	Parliament of Pakistan	Senate	Upper	6	96
Palau	National Congress	House of Delegates (Note: Native name not available)	Lower	4	16
Palau	National Congress	Senate	Upper	4	13
Panama	National Assembly		Unicameral	5	71
Papua New Guinea	National Parliament		Unicameral	5	109
Paraguay	Congress	Chamber of Deputies	Lower	5	80
Paraguay	Congress	Chamber of Senators	Upper	5	45
Peru	Congress of the Republic	Chamber of Deputies	Lower	5	130
Peru	Congress of the Republic	Senate	Upper	5	60
Philippines	Congress	House of Representatives	Lower	3	304
Philippines	Congress	Senate	Upper	6	24
Poland	Parliament of Poland	Sejm	Lower	4	460
Poland	Parliament of Poland	Senate	Upper	4	100
Portugal	Assembly of the Republic		Unicameral	4	230
Qatar	Consultative Assembly (Note: The Consultative Assembly has only consultative task.)		Unicameral		35
Romania	Parliament	Chamber of Deputies	Lower	4	329
Romania	Parliament	Senate	Upper	4	137
Russia	Federal Assembly	State Duma	Lower	5	450
Russia	Federal Assembly	Federation Council	Upper	dependent on individual elections in the federal subjects (4 or 5)	170
Rwanda	Parliament	Chamber of Deputies	Lower	5	80
Rwanda	Parliament	Senate	Upper	8	26
Saint Kitts and Nevis	National Assembly		Unicameral	5	15
Saint Lucia	Parliament	House of Assembly	Lower	5	17
Saint Lucia	Parliament	Senate	Upper		11
Saint Vincent and the Grenadines	House of Assembly		Unicameral	5	21
Samoa	Parliament	Legislative Assembly	Unicameral	5	51
San Marino	Grand and General Council		Unicameral	5	60
São Tomé and Príncipe	National Assembly		Unicameral	4	55
Saudi Arabia	Consultative Assembly		non-parliamentary	4	150
Senegal	National Assembly		Unicameral	5	150
Serbia	National Assembly		Unicameral	4	250
Seychelles	National Assembly		Unicameral	5	31
Sierra Leone	Parliament		Unicameral	5	146
Singapore	Parliament		Unicameral	5	103
Slovakia	National Council		Unicameral	4	150
Slovenia	Parliament	National Assembly	Lower	4	90
Slovenia	Parliament	National Council	Upper	5	40
Solomon Islands	National Parliament		Unicameral	4	50
Somalia	Federal Parliament	House of the People	Lower	4	275
Somalia	Federal Parliament	Senate	Upper	4	54
South Africa	Parliament	National Assembly	Lower	5	400
South Africa	Parliament	National Council of Provinces	Upper		90
South Korea	National Assembly		Unicameral	4	300
South Sudan	National Legislature	National Legislature Assembly	Lower		170
South Sudan	National Legislature	Council of States	Upper		50
Spain	General Courts	Congress of Deputies	Lower	4, unless elections are called earlier.	350
Spain	General Courts	Senate	Upper	4, unless elections are called earlier.	265
Sri Lanka	Parliament		Unicameral	5	225
Sudan	National Legislature	National Assembly	Lower	6	426
Sudan	National Legislature	Council of States	Upper	6	50
Suriname	National Assembly		Unicameral	5	51
Sweden	Riksdag		Unicameral	4	349
Syria	People's Assembly		Unicameral	4	210
Switzerland	Federal Assembly	National Council	Lower	4	200
Switzerland	Federal Assembly	Council of States	Upper	4	46
Tajikistan	Supreme Assembly	Assembly of Representatives	Lower	5	63
Tajikistan	Supreme Assembly	National Assembly	Upper	5	33
Tanzania	National Assembly		Unicameral	5	384
Thailand	National Assembly	House of Representatives	Lower	4	500
Thailand	National Assembly	Senate	Upper	5	200
Togo	National Assembly		Unicameral	5	113
Tonga	Legislative Assembly		Unicameral	4, Unless elections are called early	25
Trinidad and Tobago	Parliament	House of Representatives	Lower	5	41
Trinidad and Tobago	Parliament	Senate	Upper		31
Tunisia	Parliament of Tunisia	Assembly of the Representatives of the People	Lower	5	161
Tunisia	Parliament of Tunisia	National Council of Regions and Districts	Upper	5	77
Turkey	Grand National Assembly		Unicameral	5	600
Turkmenistan	Assembly		Unicameral	5	125
Tuvalu	Parliament		Unicameral	4	15
Uganda	Parliament		Unicameral	5	529
Ukraine	Verkhovna Rada		Unicameral	5	450
United Arab Emirates	Federal National Assembly		Unicameral	4	40
United Kingdom	Parliament	House of Commons	Lower	5, unless elections are called earlier.	650
United Kingdom	Parliament	House of Lords	Upper	Life (life and hereditary peers); Until end of religious term (Note: Archbishops who reach the end of their term are typically appointed life peers.) (bishops)	796 (Note: Excludes 19 members currently unable to take part in proceedings)
United States	Congress	House of Representatives	Lower	2	435
United States	Congress	Senate	Upper	6	100
Uruguay	General Assembly	Chamber of Representatives	Lower	5	99
Uruguay	General Assembly	Chamber of Senators	Upper	5	30
Uzbekistan	Oliy Majlis	Legislative Chamber	Lower	5	150
Uzbekistan	Oliy Majlis	Senate	Upper	5	100
Vanuatu	Parliament		Unicameral	4	52
Vatican City/Holy See	Pontifical Commission		Unicameral	5	7
Venezuela	National Assembly		Unicameral	5	277
Vietnam	National Assembly		Unicameral	5	500
Yemen	Parliament	House of Representatives	Lower	6	301
Yemen	Parliament	Shura Council	Upper	Life	111
Zambia	National Assembly		Unicameral	5	166
Zimbabwe	Parliament	National Assembly	Lower	7	280
Zimbabwe	Parliament	Senate	Upper	7	90

=== Legislatures of autonomous regions, dependencies and other territories ===
Region or territory		Overall name of legislature	Name of house	House level	Term (years)	Seats
Adjara		Supreme Council of the Autonomous Republic of Adjara		Unicameral	4	21
Åland		Legislative Assembly		Unicameral	4	30
Alderney		States		Unicameral	4	10
American Samoa		Fono	House of Representatives	Lower	2	21
American Samoa		Fono	Senate	Upper	4	18
Anguilla		House of Assembly		Unicameral	5	11
Aosta Valley		Regional Council		Unicameral	5	35
Aragon		Cortes		Unicameral	4	67
Aruba		Estates		Unicameral	4	21
Azores		Legislative Assembly		Unicameral	4	57
Bangsamoro		Parliament		Unicameral	3	80
Basque Country		Parliament		Unicameral	4	75
Bermuda		Parliament	House of Assembly	Lower	5	36
Bermuda		Parliament	Senate	Upper		11
British Virgin Islands		House of Assembly		Unicameral	4	15
Canary Islands		Parliament		Unicameral	4	70
Catalonia		Parliament		Unicameral	4	135
Cayman Islands		Legislative Assembly		Unicameral	4	18
Cook Islands		Parliament		Unicameral	4	24
Corsica		Corsican Assembly		Unicameral	6	63
(Autonomous Republic of Crimea) Crimea		State Council		Unicameral		100
Curaçao		Estates		Unicameral	4	21
Falkland Islands		Legislative Assembly		Unicameral	4	11
Faroe Islands		Løgting		Unicameral	4	33
French Polynesia		Assembly		Unicameral	5	57
Galicia		Parliament		Unicameral	4	75
Gibraltar		Parliament		Unicameral	4	17
Greenland		Parliament		Unicameral	4	31
Guam		Legislature		Unicameral	4	15
Guernsey		States		Unicameral	4	45
Hong Kong		Legislative Council		Unicameral	4	90
Isle of Man		Tynwald	House of Keys	Lower	5	24
Isle of Man		Tynwald	Legislative Council	Upper	5	11
Jersey		States Assembly		Unicameral	4	49
Karakalpakstan		Supreme Council		Unicameral	5	65
Kurdistan Region		Kurdistan Region Parliament		Unicameral	5	111
Macau		Legislative Assembly		Unicameral	4	29
Madeira		Legislative Assembly		Unicameral	4	47
Montserrat		Legislative Assembly		Unicameral	5	9
Nakhchivan Autonomous Republic		Supreme Assembly		Unicameral	5	45
New Caledonia		Congress		Unicameral	5	54
Northern Ireland		Northern Ireland Assembly		Unicameral	5	90
Northern Mariana Islands		Commonwealth Legislature	House of Representatives	Lower	2	20
Northern Mariana Islands		Commonwealth Legislature	Senate	Upper	2	10
Niue		Assembly		Unicameral	3	20
Pitcairn Islands		Island Council		Unicameral	3	10
Puerto Rico		Legislative Assembly	House of Representatives	Lower	4	51
Puerto Rico		Legislative Assembly	Senate	Upper	4	27
Saint Barthélemy		Territorial Council		Unicameral	5	19
Saint Helena		Legislative Council		Unicameral	4	21
Saint Martin		Territorial Council		Unicameral	6	23
Saint Pierre and Miquelon		Territorial Council		Unicameral	6	19
Sardinia		Regional Council		Unicameral	5	60
Sark		Chief Pleas		Unicameral		12
Scotland		Scottish Parliament		Unicameral	5	129
Sicily		Regional Assembly		Unicameral	5	70
Sint Maarten		Estates		Unicameral	4	15
Tokelau		General Fono		Unicameral	3	20
Trentino-Alto Adige/Südtirol	Trentino	Regional council	Provincial Council of Trento	Unicameral	5	35
Trentino-Alto Adige/Südtirol	South Tyrol	Regional council	Landtag	Unicameral	5	35
Turks and Caicos Islands		Parliament		Unicameral	4	21
U.S. Virgin Islands		Legislature		Unicameral	2	15
Vojvodina		Assembly		Unicameral	4	120
Wales		Senedd		Unicameral	5	96
Wallis and Futuna		Territorial Assembly		Unicameral	5	20
Zanzibar		House of Representatives		Unicameral	5	88

=== Legislatures of non-UN states (including unrecognized and disputed territories) ===
non-UN state	Overall name of legislature	Name of house	House level	Term (years)	Seats
Abkhazia	People's Assembly		Unicameral	5	35
Kosovo	Assembly of Kosovo		Unicameral	4	120
Northern Cyprus	Assembly of the Republic		Unicameral	5	50
Palestine	Legislative Council		Unicameral		132
Sahrawi Arab Democratic Republic	Sahrawi National Council		Unicameral	2	53
Somaliland	Parliament	House of Representatives	Lower	5	82
Somaliland	Parliament	House of Elders	Upper	6	82
South Ossetia	Parliament		Unicameral	5	34
Taiwan	Legislative Yuan		Unicameral	4	113
Transnistria	Supreme Council		Unicameral	5	33

== See also ==
- Elections by country (legislatures elections)
- List of national governments
- List of current heads of state and government
- List of supreme courts by country
- List of United States state legislatures
- Legislative assemblies of Canadian provinces and territories
- Parliaments of the Australian states and territories
- National parliaments of the European Union
- List of legislatures by number of members
- List of legislative buildings
- List of legislatures by female members
- List of current presidents of legislatures
