= Ministry of Justice (Oman) =

Department of the Government of Sultanate of Oman

Ministry of Justice is a governmental body in the Sultanate of Oman. Established in 1970, the ministry is distinct from the Ministry of Legal Affairs and has the following objectives: It was merged into Ministry of Justice and Legal Affairs in 2020.

- Developing the judicial system, qualifying and training judges so as to achieve superseding justice
- Strengthening judicial ethics and enhancing its systems
- Carry out judicial inspection in accordance with the judicial inspection regulation
- Organizing the administrative and financial affairs of courts and supervising them
- Regulating Expertise procedures in accordance with the laws
- Regulating and managing the work of the notary public
- Supervising lawyers’ affairs in accordance with the applied rules and regulations
- Preparing and issuing the relevant regulations, by-laws, and decisions
- Proposing the projects of law related to the Ministry's functions
- Acting on regional and international cooperation with respect to judicial affairs
- Managing and investing orphans’ and underage properties so as to maintain them in accordance with the rules and procedures in this respect

== List of ministers ==
=== Minister of Justice ===
- Mohammed bin Ahmed al-Busaidi (1970-1972)

=== Minister of Interior and Justice ===
- Sultan ibn Hamud (1972-1973)
- Hilal ibn Hamad al-Sammar (1973-1984) (he would later be referred to as the Minister of Justice Awqaf & Islamic Affairs)

=== Minister of Justice Awqaf & Islamic Affairs ===
- Hilal bin Hamad al-Busaidi (1985-1991)
- Hamud bin Abdallah al-Harthi (1991-1997)

=== Minister of Justice ===
- Muhammad bin Abdallah bin Zahir al Hinai (1998-2012)
- Abd al-Malik al-Khalili (2012-2020)

== See also ==
- Justice ministry
- Ministry of Legal Affairs (Oman)
- Politics of Oman
