= Yahya bin Mahfoudh al-Mantheri =

Oman politician

Yahya Bin Mahfoodh Bin Salim Al-Manthri
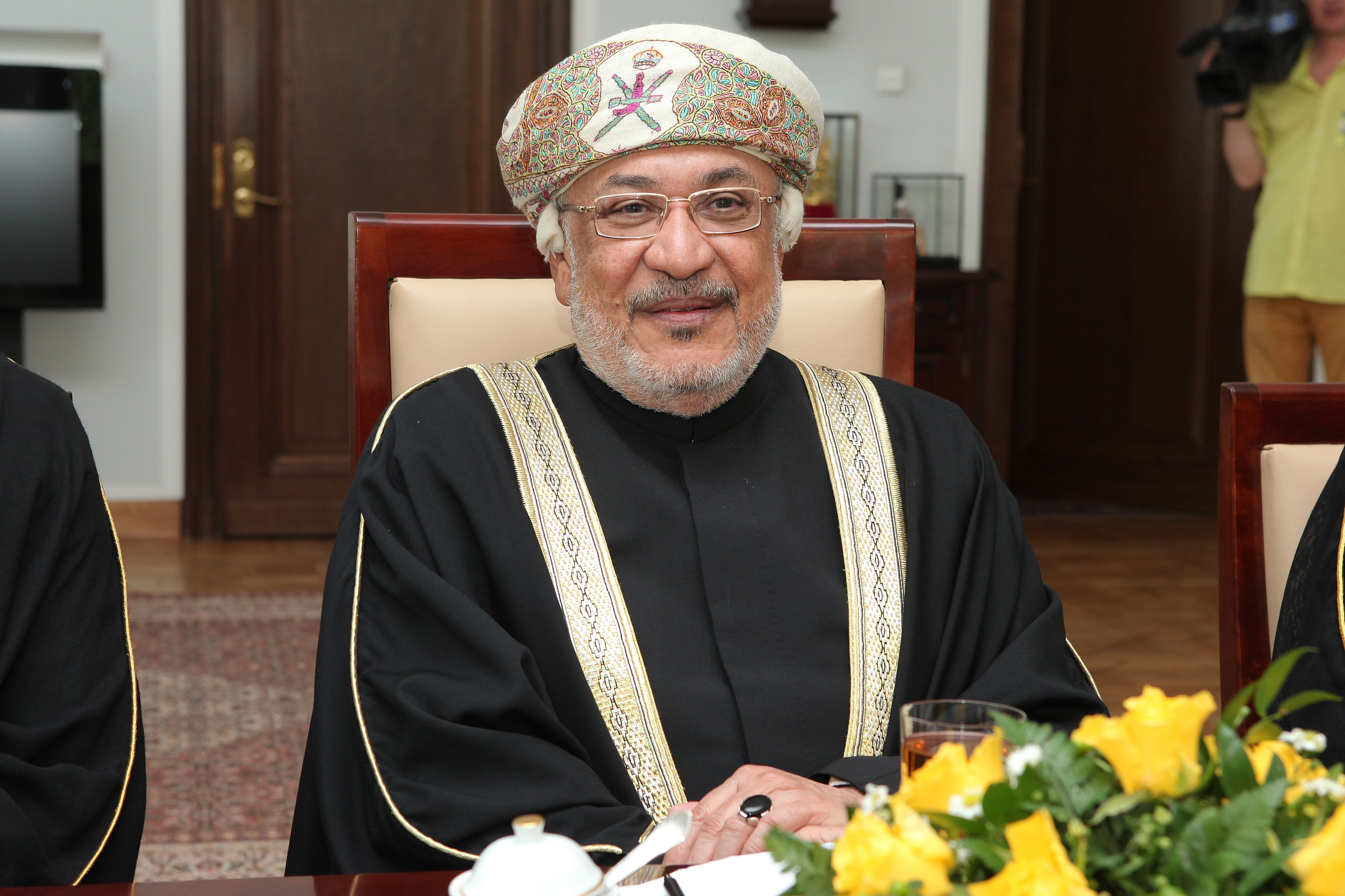

Chairman of the Council of State of Oman
- In office March 8, 2004 – August 18, 2020
- Succeeded by: Abdulmalik Al Khalili
- Monarch: Sultan Qaboos bin Said

Minister of Higher Education
- In office 1994–2004

Minister of Education
- In office 1980–1994

Personal details
- Born: 1949 (age 75–76)
- Education: Damascus University, master of arts from Oklahoma University, P.H.D from University of Edinburgh

Yahya bin Mahfoudh al-Mantheri (born in 1949) is a politician from Oman who served as chairman of the Council of State of Oman from 8 March 2004 to 18 August 2020. He has been also served as Minister of Higher Education of Oman and Chairmen of Sultan Qaboos University.

He has degrees from Damascus University, master of arts from Oklahoma University and P.H.D from University of Edinburgh. He worked in the Omani mission in the UN 1972-1977. He was minister of education from 1980 to 1994, and minister of higher education from 1994 to 2004.
