= Abdullah Al Saidi =

Omani politician

Abdullah bin Mohammed bin Said Al Saidi
- عبدالله بن محمد بن سعيد السعيدي
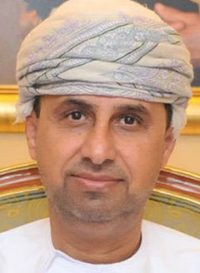
- Al Saidi in 2010

Minister of Justice and Legal Affairs
- Incumbent
- Assumed office March 7, 2011
- Monarchs: Qaboos bin Said; Haitham bin Tariq
- Prime Minister: Qaboos bin Said; Haitham bin Tariq
- Preceded by: Mohammed bin Ali bin Nasser Al Alawi

Personal details
- Education: Queen Mary University of London (PhD)

Abdullah bin Mohammed bin Said Al Saidi (Arabic: عبدالله بن محمد بن سعيد السعيدي) is the current legal sffairs minister of the Sultanate of Oman and the chairman of the board of directors of the Oman Charitable Organization. He has been the Minister of Legal Affairs since March 7, 2011.

== Education ==
He obtained his PhD in law from Queen Mary, University of London in 2004.

== Career ==
Prior to his appointment as the Minister of Legal Affairs, Al Saidi worked as an advocate in a private practice.

Abdullah was elected as a member of the Shura Council of Oman for two terms between 1991 and 1997.
