= Khalfan bin Nasser Al Wahaibi =

Omani politician

Chairman of the Consultative Assembly
- In office November 1981 – October 1983
- Preceded by: New position
- Succeeded by: Hamoud bin Abdullah al-Harthi

Personal details
- Born: 27 October, 1939 (86 years) Muscat

Khalfan bin Nasser Al Wahaibi is a politician and banker from Oman who served as minister and Chairman of the Consultative Assembly.

He was born in 1940 in Muscat. He was educated in Qatar. He worked in the Qatari department of health from 1956 to 1962. He worked as trade relations manager of Petroleum Development Oman from 1962 to 1972.

He was appointed minister of social affairs and labour from 1972 to 1979. He was additionally acting minister of education from January 1973 to December 1973. He was appointed as the Chairman of the State Consultative Assembly from 1979 to 1981. He was appointed as the Chairman of the Consultative Assembly from November 1981 to October 1983. He was appointed as minister of electricity and water from 1981 to 1990.

He was chairman of Oman Arab Bank SAO in 1989. He was appointed as chairman of National Bank of Oman from December 1992 until his resignation in May 2004.

He was an appointed member of Council of State 1997-2000, 2003-2007 and 2007-2011.
