= Ministry of Justice and Legal Affairs (Oman) =

Sultanate of Oman Ministry of Justice and Legal Affairs
- وزارة العدل والشؤون القانونية
- National emblem of Oman

Agency overview
- Formed: August 2020
- Jurisdiction: Government of Oman
- Headquarters: Muscat (Oman)
- Agency executives: Abdullah Al Saidi, Minister; Yahya Al Khusaibi, Undersecretary
- Website: Official website

The Ministry of Justice and Legal Affairs (MJLA) (Arabic: وزراة العدل والشؤون القانونية) is the governmental body in the Sultanate of Oman responsible for drafting legislation, providing other government bodies with legal advice, and regulating the legal profession. It was the result of the merger of the Ministry of Justice and the Ministry of Legal Affairs in August 2020.

The Minister of Justice and Legal Affairs is Abdulla bin Mohammed bin Said Al Saeedi and the Undersecretary of the Ministry of Justice and Legal Affairs is Yahya bin Nasser bin Mansoor Al Khusaibi.
