= Alkhattab Alhinai =

Omani politician

Deputy Chairman of Oman State Council
- Incumbent
- Assumed office November 2015
- President: Yahya Almantheri

Oman State Council Member
- In office 2011–2015

Personal details
- Born: 1953 (age 72–73) Nizwa, Oman
- Education: AUB (BS, MS); USIU (MS); Imperial College London (PhD)
- Alma mater: Imperial College London; American University of Beirut

Alkhattab bin Ghalib Alhinai (Arabic: الخطاب بن غالب الهنائي) (born 1953) is the Deputy Chairman of Oman State Council serving since November 2015. Alkhattab Alhinai served as a member of Oman State Council and as Chairman of the State Council Education committee on the fifth term (2011-2015) of the Council.

== Early life and education ==
Alkhattab was born in Nizwa, Oman in 1953. He received a Bachelor of Science degree in geology from the American University of Beirut (AUB) in 1972. He later received a Master of Science degree in management science from United States International University in San Diego, California in 1977 and a Master of Science degree in geology from the American University of Beirut (AUB) in 1979. In 1988, Alkhattab was awarded a doctorate in geology for his thesis on submerged sand dunes in the Persian Gulf from Imperial College London.

== Career ==
Alkhattab began his academic career as a graduate assistant at AUB in 1973. He later became a research assistant at the division of geology and minerals at the research institute of King Fahd University of Petroleum and Minerals (KFUPM). In 1988, Alkhattab served as an assistant professor at the earth sciences department of KFUPM. Subsequently, he served as an associate professor at the earth sciences department of KFUPM. He later took on managerial positions by serving as a manager of KFUPM remote sensing center from 1991 until 1998. In 2003, he served as manager of the geology & minerals section and the research & innovation support office. He also served as the deputy project manager of nationwide college education strategic planning project in 2005. He later became the head of public relations and international affairs of KFUPM.

== Public life and board memberships ==
Alkhattab serves as the chairperson of the National Steering Committee and Oman Astronomical Society. He is a member of the Board of Trustees at University of Nizwa and German University of Technology in Oman (GUTech). He also serves as an academic consultant to Oman University project. He previously served as the secretary general of the International Advisory Board (IAB) at King Fahd University of Petroleum and Minerals.
