= Official Gazette (Oman) =

Government gazette of the Sultanate of Oman

- Language: Arabic
- Country: Oman
- Website: mola.gov.om/legislation/gazettes

The Official Gazette (Arabic: الجريدة الرسمية Al Jareedah Al Rasmeeyah) is a weekly publication issued by the Ministry of Legal Affairs in pursuance of the Law of the Official Gazette issued by Royal Decree 84/2011.

== History ==
The Official Gazette was first established by Law No. 3/72 which stipulated the release of the Official Gazette on Thursday of every week. This law was later repealed by Law No. 4/73 which stipulated the release of the Official Gazette on bi-weekly basis. The 72 law was consequently repealed by Royal Decree 84/2011 which issued the new Law of the Official Gazette which stipulated that the Official Gazette is to be published on the first working day of every week as long as there is proper content for the Gazette to publish.

The first issue of the Official Gazette was issued on Thursday 27 April 1972.

== Contents ==
According to Article 3 of the Law of the Official Gazette, the Gazette shall publish the following:

- Laws
- Royal decrees
- Treaties and international agreements that Oman enters into after their ratification
- Royal orders and decisions
- Regulations
- Ministerial decisions and other administrative decisions issued by administrative bodies of the state and which are required to be published
- Other material to be published in accordance with the laws and royal decrees
- Any other matter needed to be published for the public interest

== Language ==
The Official Gazette is currently only published in Arabic, but Article 4 of the most recent Law of the Official Gazette authorizes the Minister of Legal Affairs to order to have it published in Arabic and English.

== Method of Distribution ==
The Official Gazette is only available in print form. The index of each issue is usually published in electronic format on the website of the Ministry of Legal Affairs.
