= 2000 Omani general election =

← 1997	14 September 2000	2003 →
- All 83 seats in the Consultative Assembly
Party	Vote %	Seats	+/–
Independents	100	83	+1
This lists parties that won seats. See the complete results below.
Chairman of the Consultative Assembly before	Chairman of the Consultative Assembly after
Abdullah bin Ali al-Qatabi; Independent	Abdullah bin Ali al-Qatabi; Independent

General elections were held in Oman on 14 September 2000. They were the first direct elections in the country's history.

== Electoral system ==
The number of members of the Consultative Assembly was increased from 82 to 83. Decree 128/97 changed the franchise rules to give the vote to anyone over 21 and who was a sheikh, dignitary or businessman, or the holder of high school or university degree. Although the number of citizens eligible to vote more than tripled to around 175,000 (25% of the adult population), only 114,570 eligible citizens (65%) registered to vote, a reduction from the 90% that registered for the 1997 elections.

Changes to the electoral law also removed the veto power of the Sultan over Assembly membership, as previously the Sultan had been able to choose the membership regardless of how many votes candidates received.

== Campaign ==
A total of 556 candidates contested the 83 seats, of which 21 were women. Political parties and campaign rallies and advertising were banned.

== Results ==
Two women were amongst the MPs elected, winning seats in Muscat and Bawshar. Voter turnout was 87%.
