= Omani nationality law =

Omani Citizenship Act

Parliament of Oman
- Long title: An Act relating to Omani citizenship
- Enacted by: Government of Oman
- Status: Current legislation

Oman nationality law determines who is a citizen of Oman and who is not. Foreigners are rarely given citizenship. Like the majority of Arab countries, Oman does not allow dual citizenship, except by the Royal Decree of the Sultan.

== By birth ==
Children born to unknown parents in Oman are Omani citizens by birth.

== By descent ==
Children born to an Omani father or an Omani mother and an unknown father irrespective of the place of birth are Omani citizens by descent. Children born to an Omani mother and foreign father may be granted citizenship if they fulfill the following:

- The child's foreign father is dead, divorced or abandoned the Omani mother for at least 10 years
- If the child is born outside of Oman with an Omani father, and the child came to Oman before the age of 18, the child can get citizenship, but if not, the child will be considered the same as a fresh applicant
- The marriage took place with permission from the Ministry
- Under the Omani mother's custody
- Lived in Oman for 10 years
- Not a criminal; has a good reputation
- Can voluntarily give up his foreign nationalities
- Their guardian has given permission

== By marriage ==
A foreign woman who married an Omani man has right to Omani citizenship if she fulfills the following:

- The marriage took place with permission from the Ministry
- Bore her Omani husband a child (وَلَد, walad)
- Lived with her husband for 10 years in Oman
- Has knowledge of the Arabic language
- Not a criminal; has a good reputation

A foreign widow or divorcee of an Omani man has right to Omani citizenship if she fulfills the above and has not remarried a non-Omani person

== By naturalization ==
A foreigner may be granted citizenship if they fulfill the following:

- Lived in Oman for 15 years. If married to an Omani woman the foreign man has to stay in Oman for 10 years provided that he has a child with the Omani wife and the marriage was solemnized with permission from the Omani ministry.
- Mentally fit. Willing to renounce foreign citizenship(s)
