= 2023 Omani general election =

General election for the Consultative Assembly

- 29 October 2023
- All 90 seats in the Consultative Assembly
- Turnout: 65.85% (▲16.83pp)
| Party | Vote % | Seats | +/– |
|---|---|---|---|
| Independents | 100 | 90 | +4 |
This lists parties that won seats. See the complete results below.
| Chairman of the Consultative Assembly before | Chairman of the Consultative Assembly after |
|---|---|
| Khalid Al Mawali; Independent | Khalid Al Mawali; Independent |

General elections were held in Oman on 29 October 2023.

== Electoral system ==
The 90 members of the Consultative Assembly were elected from a mix of one- and two-member constituencies based on the 61 provinces; provinces with a population of under 30,000 elected one member while those with a population of over 30,000 elected two. Political parties were banned, meaning all candidates ran on a non-partisan basis. The elections were fully digitized.

The Consultative Assembly has some legislative and oversight powers. It has to approve or amend draft laws within a maximum of three months from the date of referral. Then it is referred to the State Council which has to approve or amend it. If the two chambers disagree, they take vote to resolve the difference. However, if any bill passes both chambers, it must be approved and signed by the Sultan to become a law. The Assembly has also the exclusive power of interpellation to any of the services ministers.

== Campaign ==
According to the final electoral lists, 843 candidates, including 32 women, competed in these elections to choose the 90 members of the Shura Council, while the total number of registered voters reached 753,690. Omani nationals living abroad cast their votes electronically.

== Results ==
Two thirds of elected members were new members. No female candidates were elected. Voter turnout was 66%, with 496,279 of the 753,690 registered voters voting. After the election Khalid Al Mawali was re-elected to the position of Chairman of the Consultative Assembly for the fourth time.

| Party | Votes | % | Seats | +/– |
|---|---|---|---|---|
| Independents | | | 90 | +4 |
| Total | | | 90 | +4 |
| Total votes | 496,279 | – | | |
| Registered voters/turnout | 753,690 | 65.85 | | |
Source: Ministry of the Interior
