= Ministry of Legal Affairs (Oman) =

Sultanate of Oman Ministry of Justice and Legal Affairs
- وزارة العدل و الشؤون القانونية
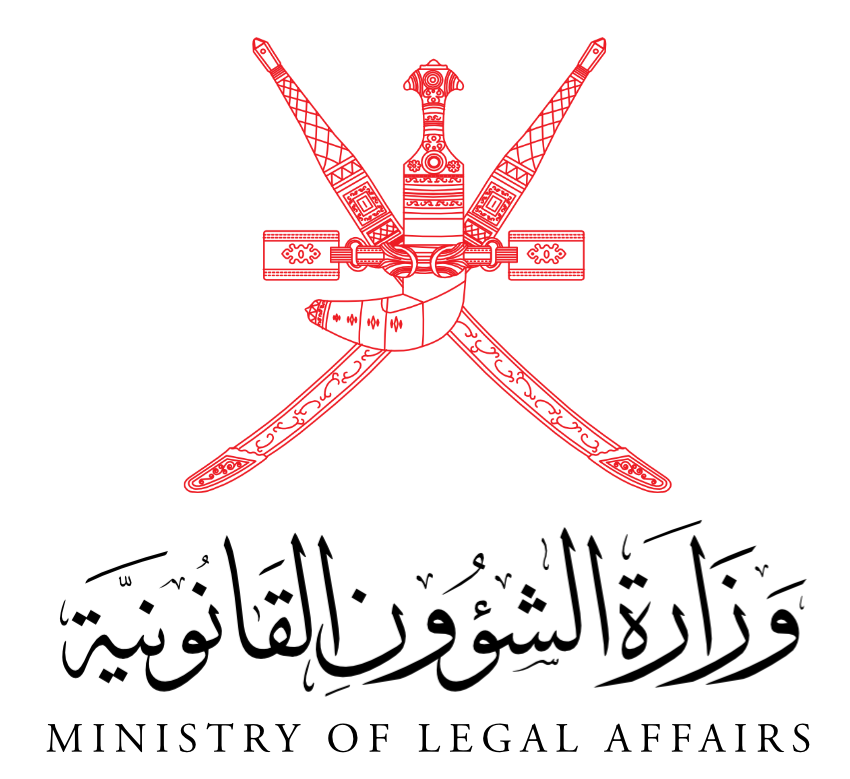

Agency overview
- Formed: 1994
- Minister responsible: Abdullah Al Saidi
- Website: www.mjla.gov.om

The Ministry of Justice and Legal Affairs (MJLA) (Arabic: وزراة العدل والشؤون القانونية) was the governmental body in the Sultanate of Oman that is responsible for drafting legislation and providing other government bodies with legal advice. It was a distinct body from the Ministry of Justice and the Public Prosecution, and they were both merged into the Ministry of Justice and Legal Affairs in August 2020.

The last Minister of Legal Affairs was Abdulla bin Mohammed bin Said Al Saeedi and the Undersecretary of the Ministry of Legal Affairs was Yahya bin Nasser bin Mansoor Al Khusaibi.

== Establishment ==
The Ministry of Legal Affairs was founded in 1994 by Royal Decree 2/94.

== Former Ministers ==
The first Minister of the Ministry of Legal Affairs was Mohamed bin Ali bin Nasser Al Alawi who was appointed in 1994 by Royal Decree No 2/94 and remained as minister until March 6, 2011.

== Function ==
The competences of MOLA were specified in Royal Decree 14/94. Its main functions include:

- Develop the laws and legislative regulations to support the renaissance of the Sultanate in coordination with other relevant ministries and government units.
- Prepare draft royal decrees and laws and carry out the procedures necessary for their issuance.
- Review draft royal decrees, laws, regulations, and ministerial decisions submitted by all ministries and government units prior to their issuance, and publish them in the Official Gazette.
- Study and review draft conventions and treaties which the government intends to conclude, and advise the government prior to the entry into any existing conventions and treaties.
- Review contracts that impose a financial obligation exceeding half a million Omani Rial prior to their signature by any government body in accordance with Article 24 of the Law of the Regulation the Administrative System of the State.
- Issue legal opinions and official interpretations of royal decrees, laws, regulations, and ministerial decisions as required with the view of enforcing legal concepts, unifying their understanding, and facilitating the application of their provisions.
- Safeguard the interests of the government in disputes arising out of the performance of contracts related to it.
- Issue the Official Gazette and determine the suitable content to be published in it in accordance with the law.
- Represent the government in international and regional organizations and conferences relating to legal affairs.
- Any other matter referred to it by His Majesty the Sultan.
- Train and qualify Omani employees working in the Ministry.

== Structure ==
MOLA had three General Directorates:

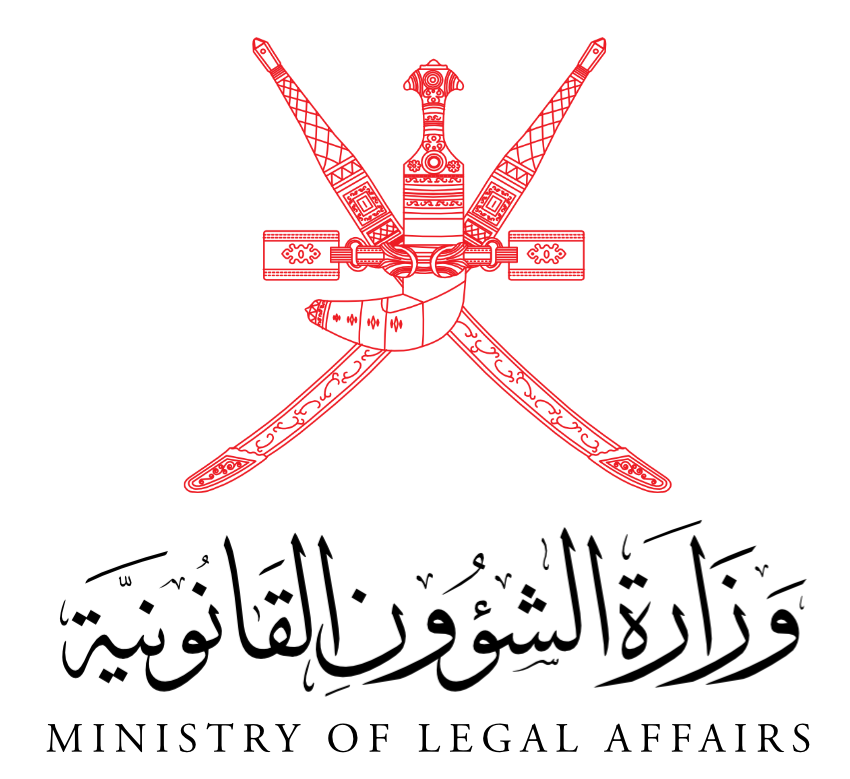
Ministry of Legal Affairs of the Sultanate of Oman - Logo

- The General Directorate of Legal Affairs - This is the body responsible for carrying out the legal functions of the Ministry.
- The General Directorate of the Official Gazette – This is the body responsible for publishing the Official Gazette.
- The General Directorate of Administrative and Financial Affairs – This is the body responsible for providing all administrative and support services necessary to run the Ministry.

The General Directorate of Legal Affairs is the core department of MOLA and the one responsible for carrying out its legal functions, it is also divided into three Directorates:

- The Directorate of Legislation – This directorate is responsible for preparing and reviewing draft legislation.
- The Directorate of Legal Opinions – This directorate is responsible for issuing legally binding opinions relating to any issue referred to MOLA from any other governmental body.
- The Directorate of Contracts and Treaties – This directorate is responsible for reviewing government contracts and international treaties.

== Publications ==
MOLA issued the following publications:

- The Official Gazette: A weekly publication containing the legislation issued in the previous two weeks.
- Annual Law Volumes: An annual volume containing all legislation issued in the past year.
- Legal Opinion Books: Periodic books containing all the legal opinions issued by MOLA in response to queries made by other governmental bodies.

Annual Law Volumes and Legal Opinion Books are available as CD applications in addition to their hard copy editions.

== Additional Responsibilities of the Minister of Legal Affairs ==
The Minister of Legal Affairs was required by law to undertake the following roles:

- Member of the Civil Service Council.
- Chairman of the Board of the Oman Charitable Organization.
- Member of the Board of Trustees of the College of Sharia Sciences.
