= Council of Oman =

Bicameral legislature of Oman

Council of Oman مجلس عُـمان

Type
- Type: Bicameral
- Houses: Council of State of Oman; Consultative Assembly of Oman

Leadership
- Speaker of the Council of State: Sheikh Abdul Malik bin Abdullah Al Khalili
- Consultative Assembly Speaker: Sheikh Khalid bin Hilal Al Mawali
- Seats: 169

Elections
- Last election: 29 October 2023

Meeting place
- Muscat, Oman

Website
- www.statecouncil.om/kentico/default.aspx www.shura.om

The Council of Oman is a bicameral parliament, made up of the members of the State Council and the Consultation Council, as stipulated in Article 58 of the Basic Law of the State. It is considered to be the main parliament in Oman. It assists the government in drawing up the general policies of the state. The Council meets at the request of the sultan to study and discuss matters raised by him, taking all its decisions on the basis of a majority vote. The sultan addresses all the members of this council on an annual basis. There are 15 women members (14 of them are in the state council) among the 169 members of the parliament.

In November 2009 construction work began on the Majlis Oman project, a landmark building to accommodate the parliament assembly hall and the upper and lower houses. The development, designed by Moller Architects of Auckland, New Zealand and built by Carillion Alawi, was completed in 2013.

In October 2011, Sultan Qaboos bin Said al Said expanded the power of the Council of Oman.

== See also ==
- Politics of Oman
- List of legislatures by country
- Category:Members of the Council of Oman
