= Areej Zarrouq =

Sudanese film director, writer, and producer

- Education: City University Cairo
- Occupation(s): Film producer writer director
- Notable work: Orange tint

Areej Tayseer Zarrouq is a female Sudanese film director, writer and producer. She is a member of the Sudan Film Factory in Khartoum, an independent cultural platform, promoting training, production and the promotion of cinema in Sudan.

Zarrouq received her BA in media studies from City University Cairo. Her short documentary film Orange Tint (2010), made with the help of the Goethe Institute in Khartoum, examined a day in the life of a group of Sudanese girls in Khartoum. It talked of their unconventional views.

== Filmography ==
- Orange tint, 2010. 26 min.
