= 2007 Omani general election =

- 27 October 2007
- All 84 seats in the Consultative Assembly
- Turnout: 62.7%
Party	Vote %	Seats	+/–
Independents	100	84	+1
This lists parties that won seats. See the complete results below.
Chairman of the Consultative Assembly before	Chairman of the Consultative Assembly after
Ahmad al-Isa'i; Independent	Ahmad al-Isa'i; Independent

General elections were held in Oman on 27 October 2007, for advisory Consultative Assembly of Oman. Political parties are banned in Oman, so all the candidates ran as independents.

== Data ==
About 390,000 people were eligible to vote for the 632 candidates (among them 21 women) standing for 84 seats in 61 districts. Shortly before the election one candidate died, leaving only 631 candidates. For the first time, all women and men over the age of 21 were enfranchised.

== Results ==
One candidate was nominated rather than elected, as he had no opponent. Women lost two seats they won in the previous election at the capital. Generally, candidates who emphasized their professional and educational background lost, while those who mainly campaigned based on their tribal and family ties received more votes. Many candidates stated the goal for the assembly was becoming a true legislative chamber and increasing its influence. Voter turnout was 62.7%.
