= List of legislatures by female members =

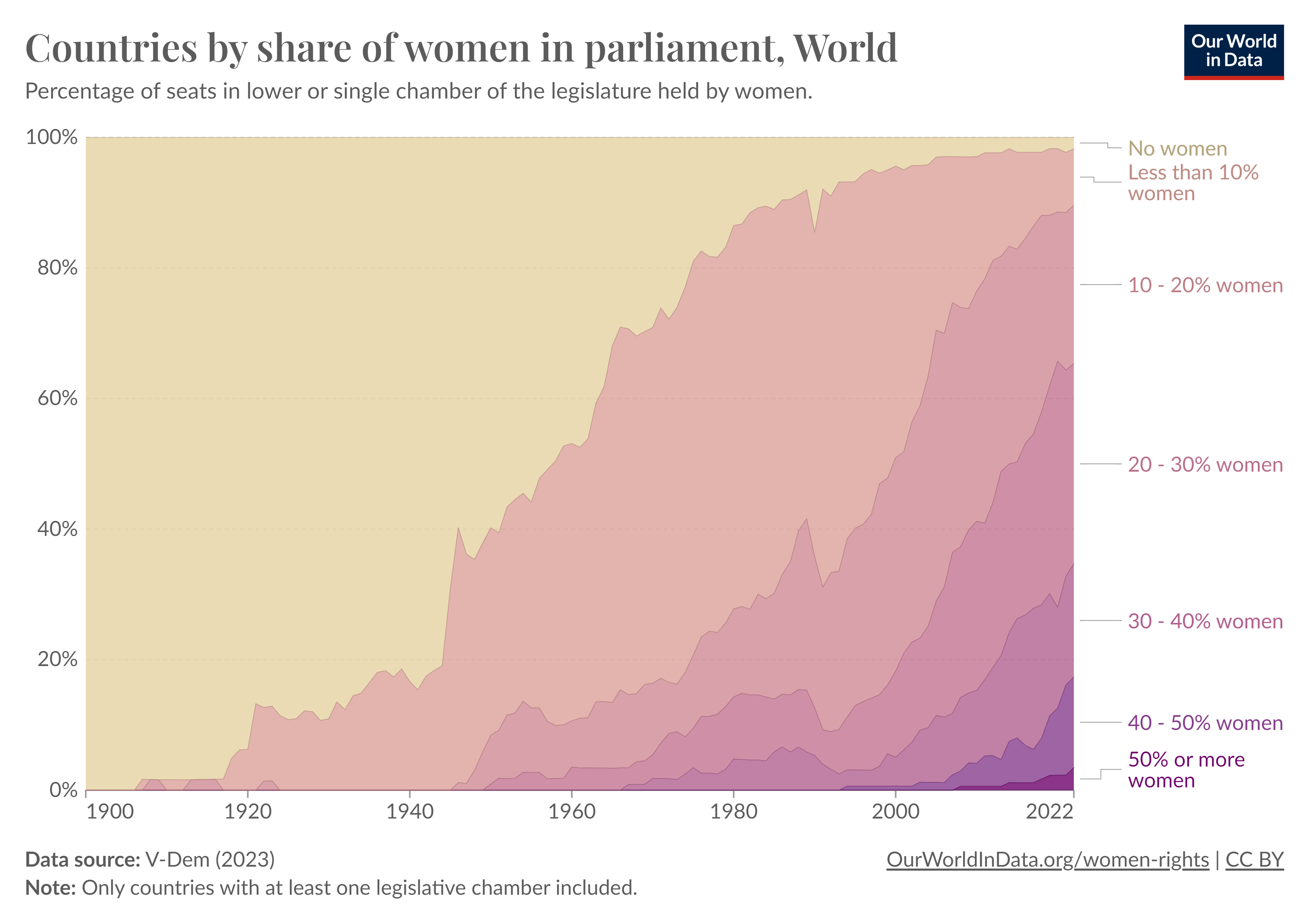
Countries by share of women in parliament

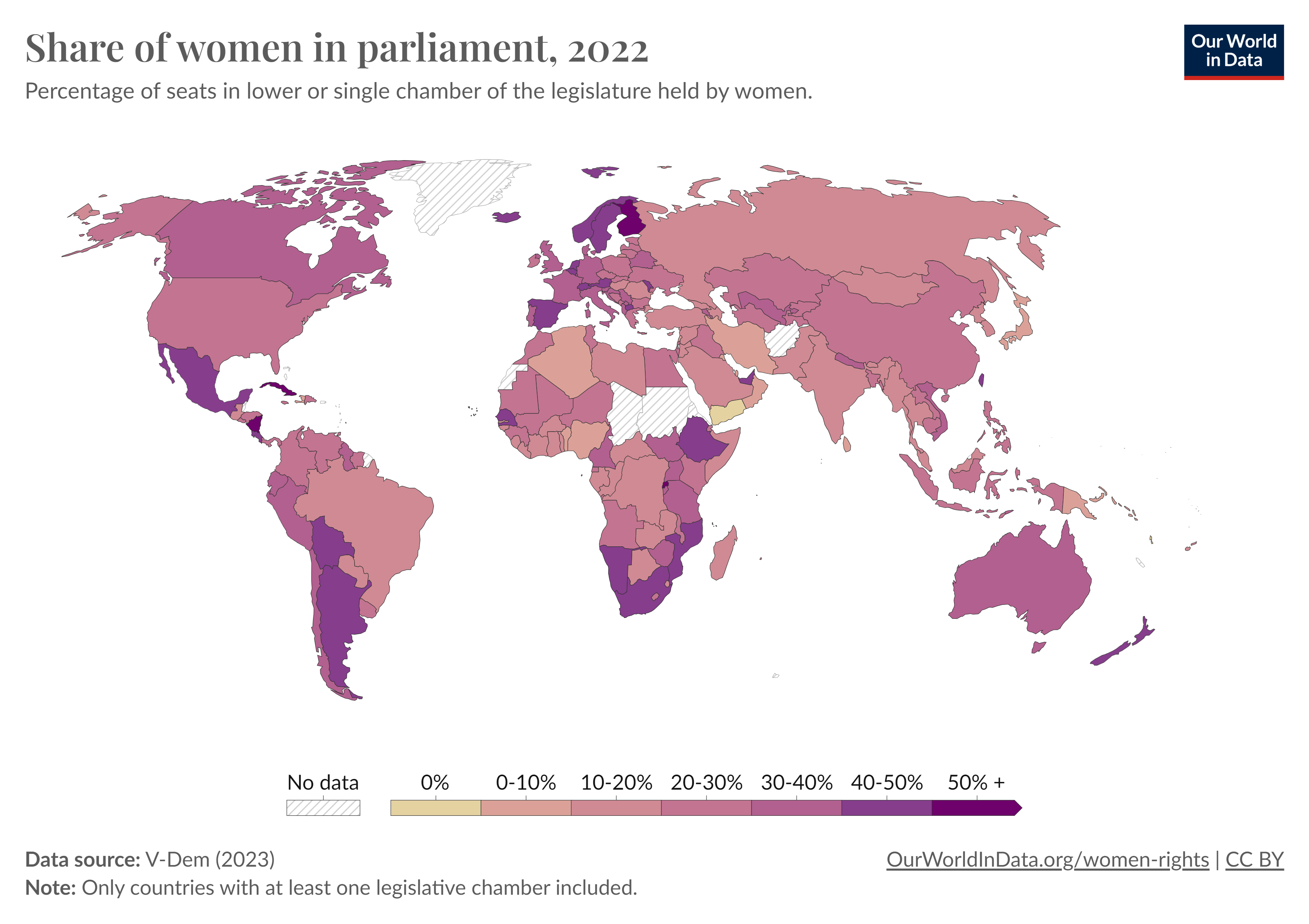
Share of women in parliament (2022)

This is a list of legislatures by number and percentage of female members as of 1 September 2022.

== List of number and percentage of women in national legislatures ==
Women in national legislatures (as of 1 September 2022)
Country	Lower House				Upper House			
Country	Last Election	Seats	Women	% W	Last Election	Seats*	Women	% W
Rwanda	2018	80	49	61.3	2019	26	9	34.6
Cuba	2018	586	313	53.4	Unicameral (no upper house)			
Nicaragua	2021	91	47	51.7	Unicameral (no upper house)			
Mexico	2021	500	250	50	2018	128	63	49.2
United Arab Emirates	2019	40	20	50	Federal Supreme Council 7 members, no women			
New Zealand	2020	120	59	49.2	Unicameral (no upper house)			
Iceland	2021	63	30	47.6	Unicameral (no upper house)			
Costa Rica	2022	57	27	47.4	Unicameral (no upper house)			
Grenada	2018	15	7	46.7	2018	13	2	15.4
Andorra	2019	28	13	46.4	Unicameral (no upper house)			
Bolivia	2020	130	60	46.2	2020	36	20	55.6
South Africa	2019	396	183	46.2	2019	54	20	37
Sweden	2018	349	161	46.1	Unicameral (no upper house)			
Finland	2019	200	91	45.5	Unicameral (no upper house)			
Norway	2021	169	76	45	Unicameral (no upper house)			
Argentina	2021	257	115	44.8	2021	72	31	43.1
Namibia	2019	104	46	44.2	2020	42	6	14.3
Senegal	2022	165	73	44.2	Unicameral (no upper house)			
Spain	2019	349	150	43	2019	265	104	39.3
Belgium	2019	150	64	42.7	2019	60	29	48.3
Switzerland	2019	200	85	42.5	2019	46	13	28.3
Mozambique	2019	250	106	42.4	Unicameral (no upper house)			
North Macedonia	2020	120	50	41.7	Unicameral (no upper house)			
Taiwan	2024	113	47	41.59	Unicameral (no upper house)			
Ethiopia	2021	470	195	41.5	2021	144	44	30.6
Austria	2019	183	75	41	–	61	25	41
Netherlands	2021	150	61	40.7	2019	75	24	32
Moldova	2021	101	41	40.6	Unicameral (no upper house)			
Belarus	2019	110	44	40	2019	60	15	25
Peru	2021	130	52	40	Unicameral (no upper house)			
Slovenia	2022	90	36	40	2017	40	4	10
Timor-Leste	2018	65	26	40	Unicameral (no upper house)			
Denmark	2019	179	71	39.7	Unicameral (no upper house)			
Cabo Verde	2021	72	28	38.9	Unicameral (no upper house)			
Ecuador	2021	137	53	38.7	Unicameral (no upper house)			
Serbia	2022	249	96	38.6	Unicameral (no upper house)			
Australia	2022	151	58	38.4	2022	76	43	56.6
Burundi	2020	123	47	38.2	2020	39	16	41
France	2022	577	215	37.3	2020	348	122	35.1
Portugal	2022	230	85	37	Unicameral (no upper house)			
Tanzania	2022	388	143	36.9	Unicameral (no upper house)			
Italy	2018	630	229	36.4	2018	320	112	35
Albania	2021	140	50	35.7	Unicameral (no upper house)			
Guyana	2020	70	25	35.7	Unicameral (no upper house)			
Armenia	2021	107	38	35.5	Unicameral (no upper house)			
Chile	2021	155	55	35.5	2021	50	12	24
Germany	2021	736	257	34.9	–	71	24	33.8
United Kingdom	2019	650	225	34.6	–	776	222	28.6
Dominica	2019	32	11	34.4	Unicameral (no upper house)			
Cameroon	2020	180	61	33.9	2018	100	26	26
Uganda	2021	556	188	33.8	Unicameral (no upper house)			
Angola	2022	220	74	33.6	Unicameral (no upper house)			
Nepal	2017	271	91	33.6	2022	59	22	37.3
Luxembourg	2018	60	20	33.3	Unicameral (no upper house)			
Monaco	2018	24	8	33.3	Unicameral (no upper house)			
San Marino	2019	60	20	33.3	Unicameral (no upper house)			
Uzbekistan	2019	144	48	33.3	2020	100	23	23
South Sudan	2021	550	178	32.4	2021	84	27	32.1
Croatia	2020	151	48	31.8	Unicameral (no upper house)			
Chad	2021	93	29	31.2	Unicameral (no upper house)			
Zimbabwe	2018	265	81	30.6	2018	77	34	44.2
Canada	2021	338	103	30.5	–	92	45	48.9
Vietnam	2021	499	151	30.3	Unicameral (no upper house)			
Israel	2021	120	36	30	Unicameral (no upper house)			
Guinea	2022	81	24	29.6	Unicameral (no upper house)			
Suriname	2020	51	15	29.4	Unicameral (no upper house)			
Singapore	2020	103	30	29.1	Unicameral (no upper house)			
Colombia	2022	187	54	28.9	2022	108	32	29.6
Iraq	2021	329	95	28.9	Unicameral (no upper house)			
Jamaica	2020	63	18	28.6	2020	21	8	38.1
Lithuania	2020	141	40	28.4	Unicameral (no upper house)			
United States	2020	430	125	28.4	2020	100	25	25
Poland	2019	460	130	28.3	2019	100	24	24
Liechtenstein	2021	25	7	28	Unicameral (no upper house)			
Dominican Republic	2020	190	53	27.9	2020	32	4	12.5
Malta	2022	79	22	27.9	Unicameral (no upper house)			
Egypt	2020	592	164	27.7	2020	300	40	13.3
El Salvador	2021	84	23	27.4	Unicameral (no upper house)			
Kazakhstan	2021	106	29	27.4	2020	48	9	18.8
Honduras	2021	128	35	27.3	Unicameral (no upper house)			
Philippines	2022	311	85	27.3	2022	24	7	29.2
Montenegro	2020	81	22	27.2	Unicameral (no upper house)			
Latvia	2018	100	27	27	Unicameral (no upper house)			
Tajikistan	2020	63	17	27	2020	31	8	25.8
Barbados	2022	30	8	26.7	2022	19	8	42.1
Mali	2020	121	32	26.5	Unicameral (no upper house)			
Tunisia	2019	217	57	26.3	Unicameral (no upper house)			
Bosnia and Herzegovina	2018	42	11	26.2	2019	15	3	20
Djibouti	2018	65	17	26.2	Unicameral (no upper house)			
Trinidad and Tobago	2020	42	11	26.2	2020	32	13	40.6
Niger	2020	166	43	25.9	Unicameral (no upper house)			
Turkmenistan	2018	116	30	25.9	2021	55	14	25.5
Estonia	2019	101	26	25.7	Unicameral (no upper house)			
Czech Republic	2021	200	51	25.5	2020	81	12	14.8
Uruguay	2019	99	25	25.3	2019	31	10	32.3
Saint Kitts and Nevis	2020	16	4	25	Unicameral (no upper house)			
China	2018	2975	742	24.9	Unicameral (no upper house)			
Lesotho	2017	115	28	24.4	2017	33	7	21.2
Morocco	2021	395	95	24.1	2021	120	15	12.5
Sao Tome and Principe	2018	55	13	23.6	Unicameral (no upper house)			
Ireland	2020	160	37	23.1	2020	59	23	39
Kenya	2022	350	81	23.1	2022	68	21	30.9
Malawi	2019	192	44	22.9	Unicameral (no upper house)			
Seychelles	2020	35	8	22.9	Unicameral (no upper house)			
Bulgaria	2021	240	54	22.5	Unicameral (no upper house)			
Panama	2019	71	16	22.5	Unicameral (no upper house)			
Equatorial Guinea	2017	100	22	22	2017	72	12	16.7
Laos	2021	164	36	22	Unicameral (no upper house)			
Indonesia	2019	575	126	21.9	No data			
Slovakia	2020	150	32	21.3	Unicameral (no upper house)			
Greece	2019	300	63	21	Unicameral (no upper house)			
Bangladesh	2018	350	73	20.9	Unicameral (no upper house)			
Cambodia	2018	125	26	20.8	2018	62	10	16.1
Kyrgyzstan	2021	88	18	20.5	Unicameral (no upper house)			
Pakistan	2018	342	70	20.5	2021	100	19	19
Mauritania	2018	153	31	20.3	Unicameral (no upper house)			
Ukraine	2019	423	86	20.3	Unicameral (no upper house)			
Mauritius	2019	70	14	20	Unicameral (no upper house)			
Saudi Arabia	2020	151	30	19.9	Unicameral (no upper house)			
Burkina Faso	2022	71	14	19.7	Unicameral (no upper house)			
Somalia	2021	274	54	19.7	2021	54	14	25.9
Fiji	2018	51	10	19.6	Unicameral (no upper house)			
Guatemala	2019	160	31	19.4	Unicameral (no upper house)			
Georgia	2020	147	28	19.1	Unicameral (no upper house)			
Romania	2020	330	63	19.1	2020	136	25	18.4
Togo	2018	91	17	18.7	Unicameral (no upper house)			
South Korea	2020	295	55	18.6	Unicameral (no upper house)			
Brazil	2022	513	95	18.5	2018	81	15	18.5
Madagascar	2019	151	28	18.5	2020	18	2	11.1
Azerbaijan	2020	120	22	18.3	Unicameral (no upper house)			
Saint Vincent and the Grenadines	2020	22	4	18.2	Unicameral (no upper house)			
Bahamas	2021	39	7	18	2021	16	4	25
North Korea	2019	687	121	17.6	Unicameral (no upper house)			
Paraguay	2018	80	14	17.5	2018	45	7	15.6
Bhutan	2018	46	8	17.4	2018	24	3	12.5
Turkey	2018	582	101	17.4	Unicameral (no upper house)			
Mongolia	2020	76	13	17.1	Unicameral (no upper house)			
Comoros	2020	24	4	16.7	Unicameral (no upper house)			
Libya	2014	170	28	16.5	Unicameral (no upper house)			
Russian Federation	2021	450	73	16.2	–	169	37	21.9
Thailand	2019	489	77	15.8	2019	248	26	10.5
Gabon	2018	143	22	15.4	2021	67	16	23.9
Zambia	2021	166	25	15.1	Unicameral (no upper house)			
Bahrain	2018	40	6	15	2018	40	9	22.5
Malaysia	2018	220	33	15	–	55	10	18.2
India	2019	542	81	14.9	2022	237	33	13.9
Congo	2022	151	22	14.6	2017	69	13	18.8
Ghana	2020	275	40	14.6	Unicameral (no upper house)			
Cyprus	2021	56	8	14.3	Unicameral (no upper house)			
Côte d'Ivoire	2021	254	36	14.2	2018	99	19	19.2
Hungary	2026	199	55	27.6	Unicameral (no upper house)			
Guinea-Bissau	2019	102	14	13.7	Unicameral (no upper house)			
Eswatini	2018	74	10	13.5	2018	30	12	40
Samoa	2021	54	7	13	Unicameral (no upper house)			
Central African Republic	2020	140	18	12.9	Unicameral (no upper house)			
Democratic Republic of the Congo	2018	500	64	12.8	2019	109	26	23.9
Belize	2020	32	4	12.5	2020	14	5	35.7
Jordan	2020	130	16	12.3	2020	65	7	10.8
Sierra Leone	2018	146	18	12.3	Unicameral (no upper house)			
Syrian Arab Republic	2020	250	28	11.2	Unicameral (no upper house)			
Antigua and Barbuda	2018	18	2	11.1	2018	17	9	52.9
Botswana	2019	63	7	11.1	Unicameral (no upper house)			
Saint Lucia	2021	18	2	11.1	2021	11	5	45.5
Liberia	2017	73	8	11	2020	30	2	6.7
Nauru	2019	19	2	10.5	Unicameral (no upper house)			
Japan	2021	464	46	9.9	2022	248	64	25.8
Brunei	2017	33	3	9.1	Unicameral (no upper house)			
Gambia	2022	58	5	8.6	Unicameral (no upper house)			
Algeria	2021	407	33	8.1	2022	164	7	4.3
Solomon Islands	2019	50	4	8	Unicameral (no upper house)			
Benin	2019	81	6	7.4	Unicameral (no upper house)			
Micronesia	2021	14	1	7.1	Unicameral (no upper house)			
Kiribati	2020	45	3	6.7	Unicameral (no upper house)			
Lebanon	2022	128	8	6.3	Unicameral (no upper house)			
Palau	2020	16	1	6.3	2020	13	1	7.7
Tuvalu	2019	16	1	6.3	Unicameral (no upper house)			
Marshall Islands	2019	33	2	6.1	Unicameral (no upper house)			
Iran	2020	286	16	5.6	Unicameral (no upper house)			
Sri Lanka	2020	225	12	5.3	Unicameral (no upper house)			
Maldives	2019	87	4	4.6	Unicameral (no upper house)			
Qatar	2021	45	2	4.4	Unicameral (no upper house)			
Tonga	2021	27	1	3.7	Unicameral (no upper house)			
Nigeria	2019	360	13	3.6	2019	109	8	7.3
Oman	2019	86	2	2.3	2019	85	15	17.7
Papua New Guinea	2022	110	2	1.8	Unicameral (no upper house)			
Kuwait	2020	62	1	1.6	Unicameral (no upper house)			
Vanuatu	2022	52	1	1.9	Unicameral (no upper house)			
Yemen	2003	250	0	0	2001	90	1	1.1
Eritrea	1994	–	–	–	Unicameral (no upper house)			
Haiti	2015	–	–	–	2016	10	0	0
Venezuela	2015	–	–	–	Unicameral (no upper house)			
Afghanistan	Appointed	Aprx. 30	0	0	Unicameral (no upper house)			
Myanmar	No data				No data			
Sudan	No data				No data			
