= Abdulmalik Al Khalili =

Omani politician

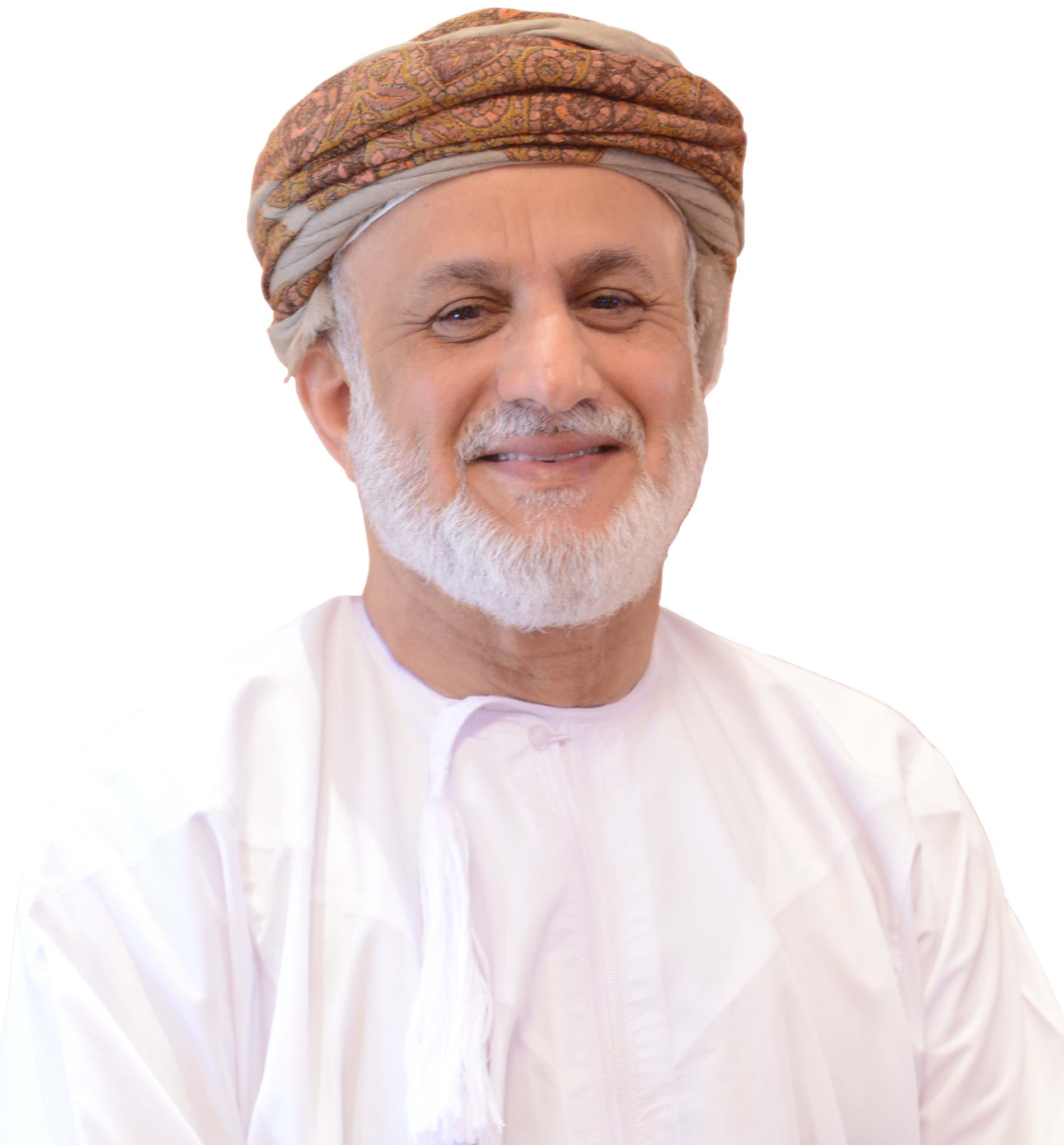

Chairman of the Council of State of Oman
- Incumbent
- Assumed office August 18, 2020
- Monarch: Sultan Haitham bin Tariq

Minister of Justice
- In office 2012–2020
- Monarch: Sultan Qaboos bin Said

Minister of Tourism
- In office 2011–2012

Chairman of Bank Muscat
- In office January 2001 – March 2011

CEO of Diwan of Royal Court pension fund
- In office 1988–2001

Personal details
- Born: 27 July 1942 (age 84)
- Education: University of Central Florida

Abdulmalik Al Khalili (born 27 July 1942) is a politician from Oman who has been serving as Chairman of the Council of State of Oman from 18 August 2020.

In 1986 he graduated with a degree in business administration from the University of Central Florida. He was the CEO of the pension fund at the Diwan of Royal Court and a member of the Fund's board of directors from 1988 to 2001. Then he worked in private sector as chairman of the board of directors of Bank Muscat from January 2001 to March 2011. He was appointed as minister of tourism from 2011 to 2012, and as minister of justice from 2012 to 2020.
