= Yahya Al Khusaibi =

Omani politician

Yahya bin Nasser bin Mansoor Al Khusaibi is the Undersecretary of the Ministry of Justice and Legal Affairs of the Sultanate of Oman.

Al Khusaibi was appointed as the Undersecretary of the Ministry of Legal Affairs by Royal Decree 71/2009 on December 13, 2009.

Prior to his appointment as Undersecretary, Al Khusaibi used to be the Director General of Legal Affairs at the Ministry of Legal Affairs.

He obtained a PhD in International Commercial Law from the University of Hull in 2007.

Al Khusaibi was appointed as the Undersecretary of the Ministry of Justice and Legal Affairs by Royal Decree 112/2020 on August 18, 2020.

== Awards ==
Al Khusaibi was awarded the First Class Royal Commendation Order by the Sultan of Oman on November 24, 2010.
