= Areej Mohsin Darwish =

Omani businessperson

Areej Mohsin Haider Darwish Al-Zaabi
- أريج محسن حيدر درويش الزعابي
- Born: 18 October 1971; Muscat, Oman
- Occupation: Chairperson of Mohsin Haider Darwish L.L.C. ACERE Cluster
- Years active: 1993–present

Areej Mohsin Haider Darwish Al-Zaabi (Arabic: أريج محسن حيدر درويش الزعابي, born 18 October 1971) is an Omani Arabian business magnate, entrepreneur, investor and billionaire.

She is the daughter of Mohsin Haider Darwish Al-Zaabi, an Omani businessman. She is the Chairperson of the Automotive, Construction Equipment, and Renewable Energy (ACERE) cluster of Mohsin Haider Darwish LLC (MHD LLC); a business house in the Middle East, which was listed in the Forbes Top 100 Arab Family Businesses in Middle East 2020.

== Biography ==
Areej was born in Muscat on 18 October to Mohsin Haider Darwish Al-Zaabi and Fatma Jaafar Abdulraheem. Her father was an Omani Businessman during the 1960s. Areej Mohsin graduated from Sultan Qaboos University with a Bachelor's in Computer Science. She started her career with Petroleum Development Oman as a Programmer. Areej joined the family business in 1994. She began her career with MHD LLC in 1994. She currently heads the ACERE cluster of Mohsin Haider Darwish LLC (MHD LLC). Areej is also on the Board of Directors of Oman Chamber of Commerce & Industry.

== Recognition ==
Areej was listed among Middle East's most powerful businesswomen by Forbes in Forbes magazine and Forbes's The Middle East's Most Powerful Businesswomen. She was also listed as a notable businesswoman in the Arab world in The Arab Power List 2021 and Women of Influence in Arab World 2021.

Areej Darwish was given special recognition from European International University (EIU), Paris, France. The university has conferred her with a Doctoral in Global Leadership & Management.

== See also ==
- Lujaina Mohsin Darwish
