= Khalid Al Mawali =

Omani politician

- خالد المعولي
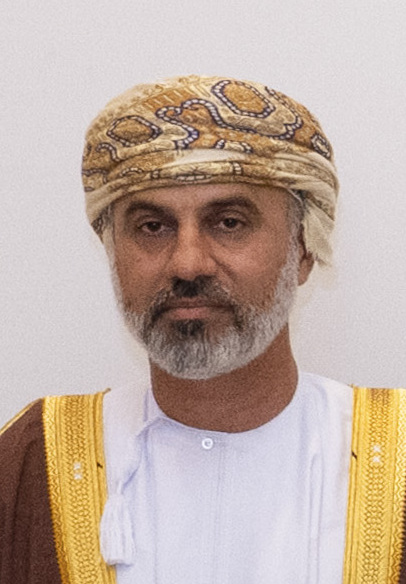
- Al Mawali in 2025

Chairman of the Consultative Assembly
- Incumbent
- Assumed office 28 October 2011
- Preceded by: Ahmad al-Isa'i

Khalid Al Mawali (born in 1975) is a politician and entrepreneur from Oman who is serving as Chairman of the Consultative Assembly. He has been elected as Chairman four times since October 2011.
