= Council of State (Oman) =

Upper house of the national parliament

Council of State of Oman مجلس الدولة العماني Majlis ad-Dawla al-ʿUmāniyyi
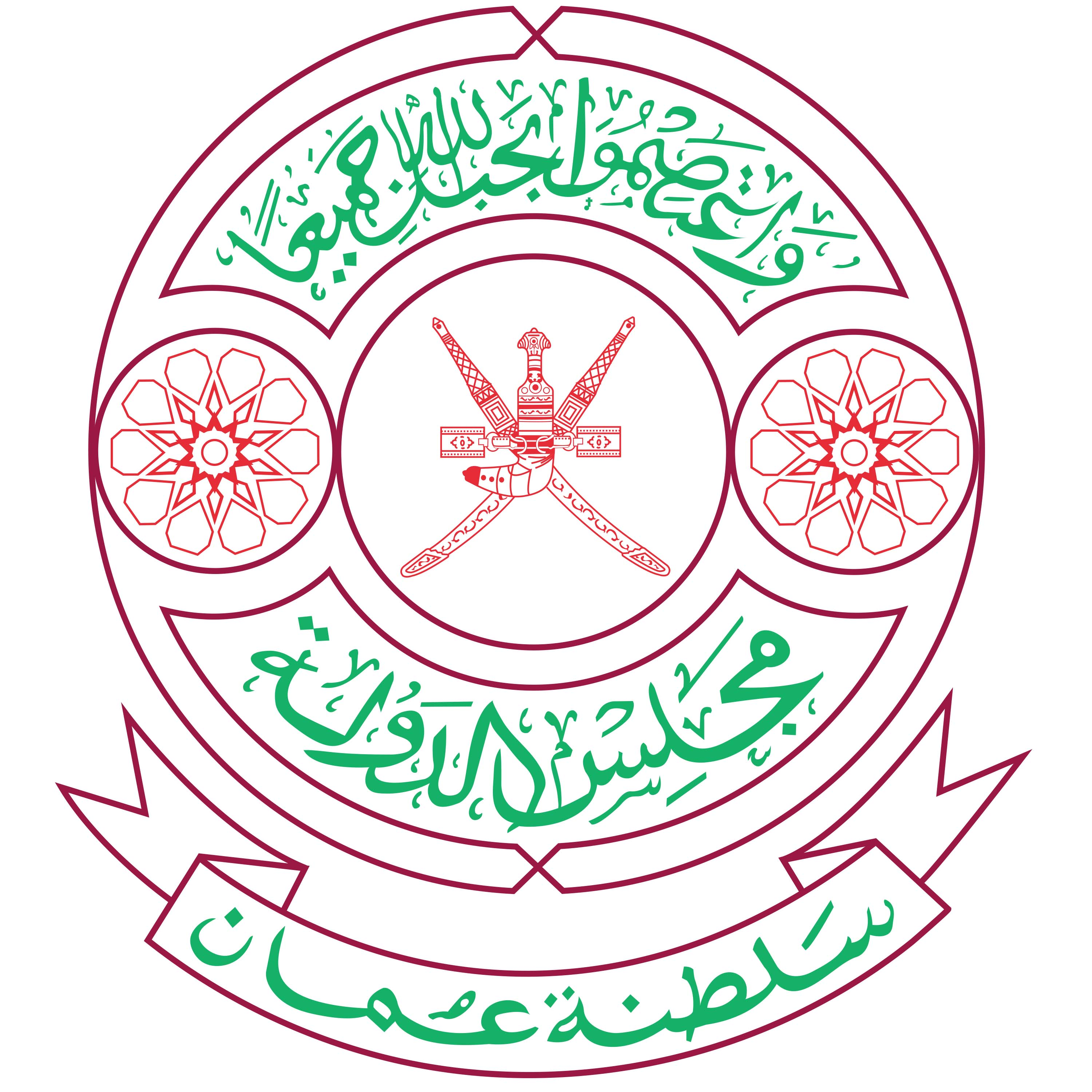

Type
- Type: Upper house of the Council of Oman
- Term limits: 4 years

History
- Founded: November 1997

Leadership
- Chairman: Abdulmalik Al Khalili since 3 November 2020
- Deputy chairman: Alkhattab bin Ghalib Alhinai

Structure
- Seats: 83
- Political groups: Non-partisan (83)

Elections
- Voting system: Appointment by the sultan of Oman

Meeting place
- Muscat

The Council of State (Arabic: مجلس الدولة العماني Majlis ad-Dawla al-ʿUmāniyyi) is the upper house of the Council of Oman. It has 83 members all of whom are appointed by the sultan. The other house is the Consultative Assembly (Majlis al-Shura).

== Legislative process ==
The Council of State was established in December 1997 with a royal decree which states (article 17) that "the State Council shall assist the Government to implement the overall development strategy and shall contribute in deepening the roots of the Omani society, maintaining the achievements and ascertaining the principles of the basic law of the state".

In October 2011, the legislative process was amended by a new royal decree; the Council of Ministers now refers a draft law to the Consultative Assembly which has to approve or amend it within three months of referral. The draft law is then referred to the Council of State, which has to approve or amend it. If the two bodies disagree, they take a vote to resolve the difference. If an absolute majority approves the draft law, the chairman of the Council of State refers it to the sultan.

== Functions ==
Identified Article 17 of the State Council and the Shura system to the Council of State does everything possible to assist in the implementation of development plans and contribute to the consolidation of the inherent values of the Omani society and preserve the achievements and reaffirm the principles enshrined in the Basic Law of the State, and separated article (18) of the same system to achieve its goals the following powers:

- Preparation of studies that help in the implementation of development plans and programs and contribute to finding appropriate solutions to the economic and social constraints.
- Make proposals that would encourage investment in various productive and service sectors and the development of economic resources.
- Provision of studies and proposals in the field of human resource development and improve the performance of administrative bodies in order to serve the community and to achieve the overall objectives of the state.
- Review bills issued before taking action, and with the exception of laws that require the public interest filed directly to His Majesty the Sultan and offers recommendations of the State Council regarding the draft legislation submitted to the Council of Ministers.
- Study what transmits it to His Majesty the Sultan or the Council of Ministers of the topics that serve the public interest, and to express an opinion where

== Requirements ==
- Must be an Omani citizen.
- Must have aged not less than 40 years of age (Gregorian calendar years) on the date of appointment.
- Never sentenced of a felony or crime involving moral turpitude or trust, even if he/she is rehabilitated.
- Not affiliated to a security or military authority.
- Not interdicted by a judicial judgment.
- Not suffering from a mental illness.

== Composition ==
The State Council has 83 members; they are appointed by the sultan for a four-year term.

== Selection ==
The members of the council are mainly:

- Former ministers, undersecretaries and their equivalents.
- Former ambassadors.
- Former senior judges.
- Retired senior officers.
- Those who are known for their competence and experience in the fields of science, arts, and culture, and professors of universities, colleges, and higher institutes.
- Dignitaries and businessmen.
- Persons who have performed distinguished services to the Nation.
- Whomsoever the sultan chooses and who does not fall under the preceding categories.

== See also ==
- List of chairmen of the Council of State of Oman
