= List of chairmen of the Consultative Assembly of Oman =

The chairman of the Consultative Assembly of Oman is appointed by the sultan by royal decree.

This is a list of chairmen (speakers) of the Consultative Assembly of Oman since 1991, and its predecessor, State Consultative Council which lasted from 1981 until 1991:

Name	Entered office	Left office	Notes
Khalfan Nasir Al Wahaybi	November 1981	28 October 1983	
Sheikh Hamoud bin Abdullah al-Harthi	28 October 1983	1991	
Abdullah bin Ali al-Qatabi	November 1991	8 September 2007	
Ahmad al-Isa'i	9 September 2007	28 October 2011	
Khalid Al Mawali	28 October 2011	Present	
