= Consultative Assembly (Oman) =

Lower house of the Council of Oman

Consultative Assembly مجلس الشورى Majlis al-Shura

Type
- Type: Lower house of the Council of Oman
- Term limits: 4 years

History
- Founded: 3 November 1981

Leadership
- Chairman: Khalid Al Mawali since 28 October 2011

Structure
- Seats: 90
- Political groups: Non-partisan (90)

Elections
- Last election: 29 October 2023

Meeting place
- Muscat, Oman

Website
- http://www.shura.om

The Consultative Assembly (Arabic: مجلس الشورى; transcription: Majlis al-Shura) is the lower house of the Council of Oman. It is the only legislative body in Oman of which all members are democratically elected. The other chamber of the parliament is the Council of State (Majlis al-Dawla).

The assembly consists of 90 elected members. Each wilayah (province) in Oman is entitled to at least one representative in the assembly. Provinces with a population of 30,000 or above are represented by two members, while provinces with fewer than 30,000 inhabitants are represented by only one member. The winning candidates are the ones who obtain the higher number of votes according to the official election results. Oman does not allow political parties; thus, only non-partisans have been elected.

== History ==
Before 1981, the Majlis al-Shura (Consultative Council) was a unicameral legislature of the Imamate of Oman until its dissolution in 1959.

== Legislative process ==
As mentioned in the Basic Law of the State (de facto constitution), the Council of Oman has some legislative and oversight powers. The Council of Ministers (the main executive branch) must have to refer draft laws to the Assembly, which has to approve or amend it within a maximum of three months from the date of referring. Then it is referred to the State Council which has to approve or amend it. If the two chambers disagree, they take vote to resolve the difference. However, if any bill passes both chambers, it must be approved and signed by the Sultan to become a law. The assembly has the exclusive power of interpellation to any of the services ministers.

== Requirements ==
- Must be an Omani national by origin.
- Must be at least 30 years old by the Gregorian calendar on the commencement date of candidature.
- Educated to at least General Education Diploma level.
- Never sentenced for a felony or crime involving moral turpitude or trust, even if he is rehabilitated.
- Enrolled in the election register.
- Not affiliated to a security or military authority.
- Not interdicted by a judicial judgment.
- Not suffering from a mental illness.
- It is permissible for whoever completes his membership term to run again as a candidate for Majlis al Shura.

== See also ==
- List of Chairmen of the Consultative Assembly of Oman
- List of legislatures by country
