= James Donaldson (basketball) =

British-American basketball player

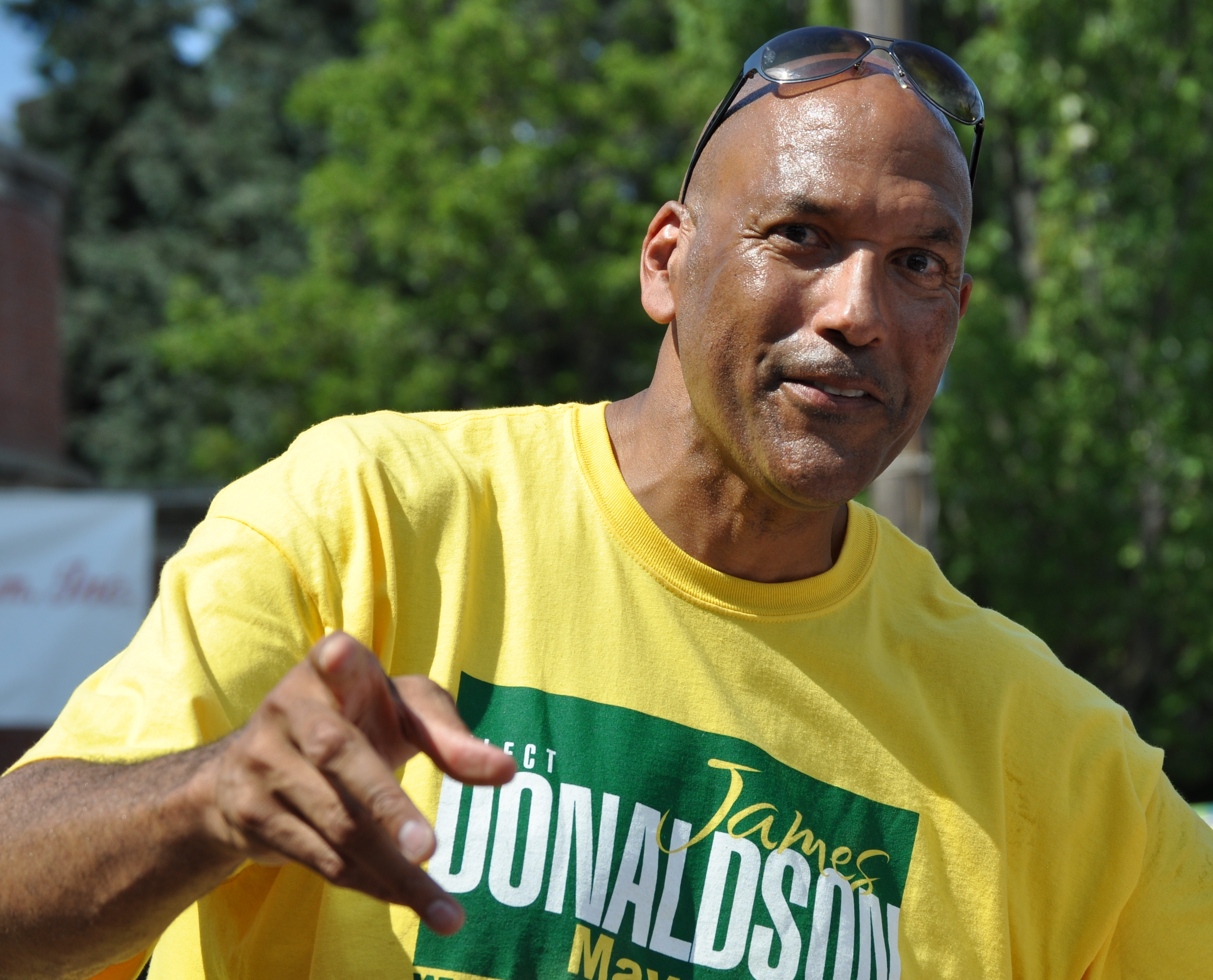
- Donaldson during his 2009 race for Mayor of Seattle

Personal information
- Born: August 16, 1957 (age 69) Heacham, England
- Listed height: 7 ft 2 in (2.18 m)
- Listed weight: 275 lb (125 kg)

Career information
- High school: Luther Burbank (Sacramento, California)
- College: Washington State (1975–1979)
- NBA draft: 1979: 4th round, 73rd overall pick
- Drafted by: Seattle SuperSonics
- Playing career: 1979–1999
- Position: Center
- Number: 40, 35, 54

Career history
- 1979–1980: 3A Antonini Siena
- 1980–1983: Seattle SuperSonics
- 1983–1985: San Diego / Los Angeles Clippers
- 1985–1991: Dallas Mavericks
- 1991–1992: New York Knicks
- 1993: Utah Jazz
- 1993–1994: Iraklis Thessaloniki
- 1995: Utah Jazz
- 1996–1997: Caja San Fernando
- 1997: Snai Montecatini
- 1998: Breogán
- 1998–1999: Gymnastikos S. Larissas
- 1999: Breogán

Career highlights
- NBA All-Star (1988); Second-team All-Pac-8 (1978)

Career NBA statistics
- Points: 8,203 (8.6 ppg)
- Rebounds: 7,492 (7.8 rpg)
- Blocks: 1,267 (1.6 bpg)
- Stats at NBA.com
- Stats at Basketball Reference

James Lee Donaldson III (born August 16, 1957) is a British-American former professional basketball player who grew up in California and played 14 seasons in the National Basketball Association and several leagues across Europe. Born in Heacham, England, Donaldson played high school basketball for Luther Burbank High School in California before enrolling at Washington State University to play for the Cougars.

== Early life and education ==
Donaldson was born as a military brat in Heacham, England, to a father who was stationed in the Air Force.

Donaldson, a 7'2" center, starred at Luther Burbank High School and Washington State in the late 1970s. In his 4 seasons at WSU he averaged 8.5 points per game and 8.1 rebounds per game in 84 games. As of April 2015 he was the all-time leader in career blocked shots (176), blocks average (2.1), single-season blocks (82 in 1977–78), single-season blocks average (3.0 in 1977–78) and single-game blocked shots (eight versus Stanford, January 25, 1978). He was inducted into the Pac-12 Hall of Honor and WSU's athletic hall of fame in 2006.

== Professional career ==
After being drafted by the Seattle SuperSonics in the 1979 NBA draft he signed a contract with 3A Antonini Siena of the Italian Serie A.

Donaldson played three seasons with Seattle before moving on to the San Diego (later Los Angeles) Clippers. During the 1984–85 NBA season, he led the league in field goal percentage at 0.637—still one of the ten highest percentages in NBA history.

Donaldson cited Artis Gilmore, Darryl Dawkins, Moses Malone, Truck Robinson and Maurice Lucas as some of the strongest players he played against early in his career.

Donaldson joined the Dallas Mavericks in 1985. He joked with teammates that leaving the lowly, dysfunctional Clippers for the Mavericks was like dying and going to heaven. He had his finest years while playing for the Mavericks, providing rebounding and shot-blocking to complement Dallas' star-studded line-up, which included Mark Aguirre, Rolando Blackman, Roy Tarpley, Derek Harper, Sam Perkins, and Brad Davis. Donaldson himself earned a spot on the 1988 All-Star Team during a season in which the Mavericks reached the Western Conference Finals before losing to the Los Angeles Lakers. The NY Daily News named him the worst All-Star player ever after fan voting. Donaldson was eventually traded to the Knicks for Brian Quinnett.

In 1990 he was founder and CEO of a dating magazine named Eligibles. It was published for a brief period of time in Dallas-Ft. Worth before going out of business.

After brief stints with the New York Knicks (traded midway through 1991–92 for Brian Quinnett) and Utah Jazz (49 games in two seasons combined) in the early 1990s, injuries forced Donaldson into retirement from the NBA. He left the league in 1995, with 8,203 career points, 7,492 career rebounds and 1,267 career blocks. He played in 957 NBA games without ever attempting a 3-point shot, a record among players from the 3-point era.

On August 1, 1993, he signed for Greek Basket League club Iraklis. He played in 30 games for Iraklis averaging 12.1 points per game, 12.2 rebounds per game and 2.2 blocks per game. In the 1996–97 season he played for Caja San Fernando averaging 3.5 points and 3.6 rebounds per game. He also had spells with Snai Montecatini (Italy, 1997–98, for only six games), Breogán Lugo (Spain, two stints, in 1998 and 1999) and Gymnastikos S. Larissas (Greek Second Division, 1998–99), retiring for good at the age of 41.

== Personal life ==
Upon retiring, Donaldson settled in the Seattle area, where he ran the Donaldson Clinic, a physical therapy business in Mill Creek, Washington, until February 2018. He is also a motivational speaker.

In 2009, Donaldson ran for the non-partisan office of Seattle mayor and came in fourth among the candidates. In 2010, Donaldson joined the College Success Foundation as the Director of the Tacoma College Success Foundation.

In January 2018, Donaldson survived an aortic dissection.

In 2021, Donaldson ran again for Seattle mayor. He placed eighth in the primary election.

== Career statistics ==
Legend
GP	Games played	GS	Games started	MPG	Minutes per game
FG%	Field goal percentage	3P%	3-point field goal percentage	FT%	Free throw percentage
RPG	Rebounds per game	APG	Assists per game	SPG	Steals per game
BPG	Blocks per game	PPG	Points per game	**Bold**	Career high
*	Led the league

=== NBA ===
==== Regular season ====
Year	Team	GP	GS	MPG	FG%	3P%	FT%	RPG	APG	SPG	BPG	PPG
1980–81	Seattle	68		14.4	.542	–	.594	4.5	.6	.1	1.1	5.3
1981–82	Seattle	82	1	20.9	.609	–	.629	6.0	.6	.3	1.7	8.1
1982–83	Seattle	82	11	21.8	.583	– (Note: While Donaldson is officially credited as having zero three-pointers attempted during the 1982–83 season, as well as zero career three-pointers attempted; the box score for a Supersonics vs. San Antonio Spurs game on March 23, 1983 credits Donaldson with one missed three-pointer.)	.688	6.1	**1.2**	.2	1.2	8.9
1983–84	San Diego	82*	67	30.8	.596	–	.761	7.9	1.1	.5	1.7	**11.8**
1984–85	L.A. Clippers	82*	58	29.2	**.637***	–	.749	8.1	.6	.3	1.6	11.3
1985–86	L.A. Clippers	**14***	14	31.5	.512	–	.814	9.4	.9	.4	**2.1**	10.2
1985–86	Dallas	**69***	64	32.5	.568	–	.799	9.6	**1.2**	.3	1.6	8.3
1986–87	Dallas	82*	**82***	**36.9**	.586	–	.812	**11.9**	.8	**.6**	1.7	10.8
1987–88	Dallas	81	81	31.1	.558	–	.778	9.3	.8	.5	1.3	7.0
1988–89	Dallas	53	53	32.9	.573	–	.766	10.8	.7	.5	1.5	9.1
1989–90	Dallas	73	73	31.0	.539	–	.700	8.6	.8	.3	.6	9.1
1990–91	Dallas	82*	**82***	34.1	.532	–	.721	8.9	.8	.4	1.1	10.0
1991–92	Dallas	44	32	22.6	.471	–	.702	6.1	.7	.2	1.0	6.2
1991–92	New York	14	0	5.8	.278	–	**1.000**	1.4	.1	.0	.4	.9
1992–93	Utah	6	1	15.7	.571	–	.556	4.8	.2	.2	1.2	3.5
1994–95	Utah	43	40	14.3	.595	–	.710	2.5	.3	.1	.7	2.6
Career		957	659	27.4	.571	–	.732	7.8	.8	.4	1.3	8.6
All-Star		1	0	8.0	–	–	1.000	6.0	1.0	.0	2.0	2.0

==== Playoffs ====
Year	Team	GP	GS	MPG	FG%	3P%	FT%	RPG	APG	SPG	BPG	PPG
1982	Seattle	8		23.6	.419	–	.750	9.3	.9	.3	.6	6.8
1983	Seattle	2		23.5	.500	–	.667	8.5	**1.0**	.0	**1.5**	**12.0**
1986	Dallas	10	10	**41.0**	.750	–	.925	**11.7**	**1.0**	.6	1.2	10.9
1987	Dallas	3	3	22.7	.800	–	.889	5.7	.7	.3	1.0	5.3
1988	Dallas	**17**	**17**	29.4	.654	–	.595	8.6	.7	.4	.9	9.3
1990	Dallas	3	3	24.7	.692	–	.800	5.3	.7	**.7**	.0	7.3
1992	New York	2	0	5.5	**1.000**	–	–	2.0	.0	.0	.5	2.0
1993	Utah	1	0	5.0	.000	–	–	.0	.0	.0	.0	.0
1995	Utah	5	5	15.2	.833	–	**1.000**	1.8	.0	.0	.6	2.8
Career		51	38	27.0	.627	–	.779	7.8	.7	.4	.8	7.9

== Electoral history ==
=== 2009 ===
2009 Seattle mayoral primary
Candidate	Votes	%
Mike McGinn	39,097	27.71%
Joe Mallahan	37,933	26.88%
Greg Nickels (incumbent)	35,781	25.36%
James Donaldson	11,478	8.13%
Jan Drago	10,154	7.20%
Elizabeth Campbell	3,485	2.47%
Kwame Garett	1,479	1.05%
Norman Sigler	1,247	0.88%
Write-in	461	0.33%
Total votes	141,115	100.00%

=== 2021 ===
2021 Seattle mayoral primary
Candidate	Votes	%
Bruce Harrell	69,612	34.00%
Lorena González	65,750	32.11%
Colleen Echohawk	21,042	10.28%
Jessyn Farrell	14,931	7.29%
Arthur Langlie	11,372	5.55%
Casey Sixkiller	6,918	3.38%
Andrew Grant Houston	5,485	2.68%
James Donaldson	3,219	1.57%
Lance Randall	2,804	1.37%
Clinton Bliss	1,618	0.79%
Omari Tahir-Garrett	391	0.19%
Bobby Tucker	377	0.18%
Henry Dennison	347	0.17%
Stan Lippmann	323	0.16%
Don Rivers	189	0.09%
Write-in	386	0.19%
Total votes	206,814	100.00%

== See also ==
- List of NBA career field goal percentage leaders
