= 2013 Seattle mayoral election =

- November 5, 2013
- Turnout: 52.50%
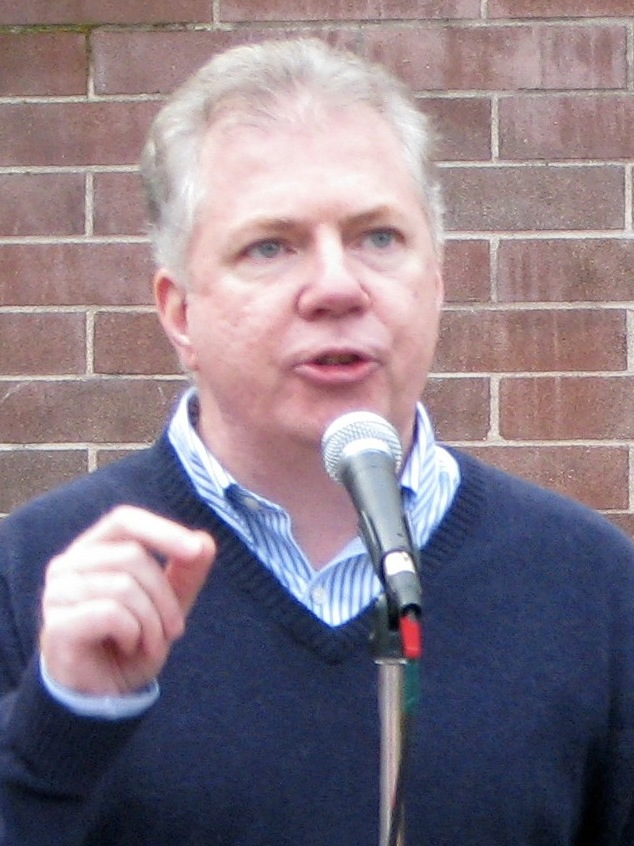

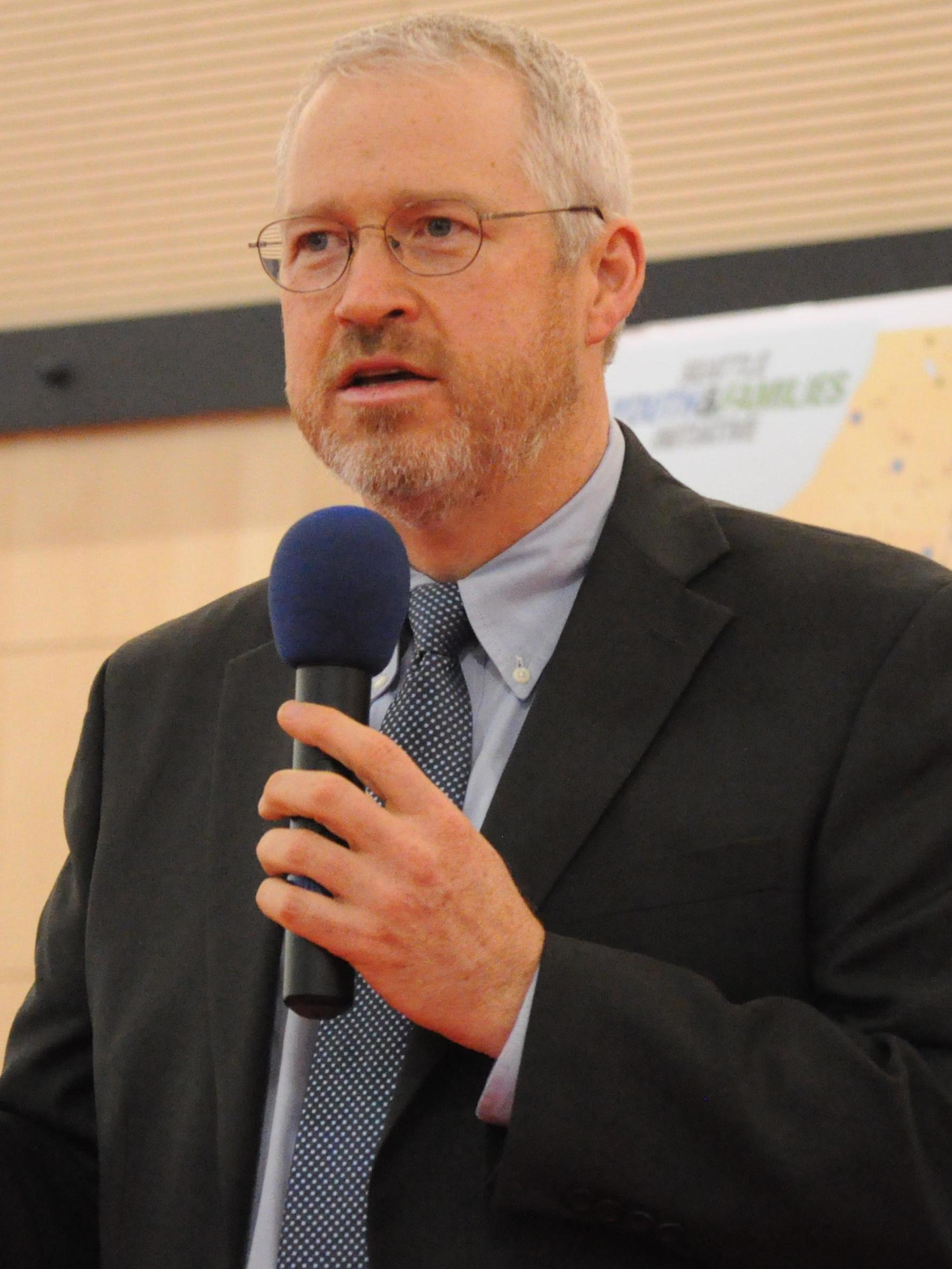
Candidate	Ed Murray	Michael McGinn
Party	Nonpartisan	Nonpartisan
Popular vote	106,384	97,935
Percentage	51.55%	47.45%
Mayor before election
Michael McGinn
Democratic
Elected mayor
Ed Murray
Democratic

The 2013 Seattle mayoral election took place on November 5, 2013, to elect the mayor of Seattle. Incumbent Mayor Michael McGinn ran for election to a second term in office.

Municipal elections in Washington are officially non-partisan. A non-partisan primary was held on August 6, 2013. The top two finishers, State Senator Ed Murray, who received 30% of the vote, and incumbent Mayor McGinn, who received 29% of the vote, advanced to the November general election.

Murray won the general election with 52%.

== Primary election ==
=== Candidates ===
==== On the ballot ====
- Joey Gray, information-systems consultant and trainer
- Bruce Harrell, City Councilman (Democratic Party)
- Kate Martin, former Greenwood Community Council President
- Mary Martin, activist (Socialist Workers Party)
- Michael McGinn, incumbent Mayor (Democratic Party)
- Doug McQuaid, attorney
- Ed Murray, State Senator (Democratic Party)
- Charlie Staadecker, real estate broker
- Peter Steinbrueck, lobbyist and former City Councilman (Democratic Party)

==== Withdrew ====
- Tim Burgess, City Councilman (Democratic Party)
- David Ishii, "character"

==== Declined ====
- Sally J. Clark, City Council President (Democratic Party)
- Maud Daudon, President and CEO of the Seattle Metropolitan Chamber of Commerce
- Ron Sims, former Deputy Secretary of Housing and Urban Development and former King County Executive (Democratic Party)

=== Polling ===
Poll source	Date(s) administered	Sample size	Margin of error	Tim Burgess	Joey Gray	Bruce Harrell	David Ishii	Kate Martin	Mary Martin	Michael McGinn	Doug McQuaid	Ed Murray	Ron Sims	Charlie Staadecker	Peter Steinbrueck	Undecided
SurveyUSA	July 15–18, 2013	501	± 4.5%	—	1%	11%	—	1%	2%	21%	1%	22%	—	3%	14%	25%
SurveyUSA	May 17–19, 2013	552	± 4.3%	—	—	12%	—	4%	3%	22%	—	15%	—	4%	17%	23%
SurveyUSA	March 4–7, 2013	647	± 3.9%	10%	—	5%	0%	3%	—	15%	—	9%	15%	1%	7%	34%
SurveyUSA	March 4–7, 2013	647	± 3.9%	11%	—	6%	0%	4%	—	19%	—	8%	—	1%	10%	38%

=== Debates and Forums ===
2013 Seattle mayoral debates and candidate forums
No.	Date	Host	Moderator	Nonpartisan	Nonpartisan	Nonpartisan	Nonpartisan	Nonpartisan	Nonpartisan	Nonpartisan	Nonpartisan	Nonpartisan
Key: P Participant A Absent N Not invited I Invited W Withdrawn												
Key: P Participant A Absent N Not invited I Invited W Withdrawn				Joey Gray	Bruce Harrell	Kate Martin	Mary Martin	Michael McGinn	Doug McQuaid	Ed Murray	Charlie Staadecker	Peter Steinbrueck
1	April 29, 2013	South Seattle Community College	C.R. Douglas	N	P	P	N	P	N	P	P	P
2	May 2, 2013	Hamilton Middle School	Unknown	N	P	P	N	P	N	P	P	P
3	June 19, 2013	Young Voters League	Wyking Garrett	P	P	P	P	P	P	P	P	A
4	July 1, 2013	Seattle Neighborhood Greenways	Tom Fucoloro Deb Salls	P	P	P	P	P	P	P	P	P
5	July 16, 2013	CityClub of Seattle	Joni Balter	N	P	N	N	P	N	P	P	P
6	July 17, 2013	KCTS 9 Downtown District Council of Seattle	Enrique Cerna Joni Balter	P	P	P	A	P	P	P	P	P

Several candidates at the May 2 forum attacked McGinn on different issues, including Murray and Harrell. Murray attempted to paint McGinn as a divisive figure who wasn't able to get things done, while Harrell argued that McGinn's accomplishments were due to the work of the Seattle City Council.

At the July 16 debate, candidate Kate Martin was escorted from the stage after arriving, as she had not been invited. Other candidates and members of the audience indicated support for Martin, which resulted in CityClub executive director Diane Douglas discussing the organization's policy for selecting candidates to invite to debates.

The debate on July 17 included questions on transportation, police department accountability, and marijuana. Marijuana was legalized in Washington the year prior through Washington Initiative 502, but the Washington State Liquor Control Board was still in the process of creating regulations for the industry.

=== Results ===
Primary election results
Candidate	Votes	%
Ed Murray	42,314	29.85
Michael McGinn	40,501	28.57
Peter Steinbrueck	22,913	16.16
Bruce Harrell	21,580	15.22
Charlie Staadecker	6,288	4.44
Doug McQuaid	2,546	1.80
Kate Martin	2,479	1.75
Mary Martin	1,498	1.06
Joey Gray	1,318	0.93
Write-in	334	0.24
Total votes	141,771	100

== General election ==
=== Candidates ===
- Michael McGinn, incumbent Mayor
- Ed Murray, State Senator

=== Polling ===
Poll source	Date(s) administered	Sample size	Margin of error	Michael McGinn	Ed Murray	Undecided
Strategies 360	October 14–16, 2013	400	± 4.9%	34%	51%	15%
SurveyUSA	October 2013	557	± 4.2%	32%	52%	15%
Public Policy Polling	October 4–6, 2013	570	± ?	28%	52%	20%
SurveyUSA	September 14–15, 2013	503	± 4.5%	30%	52%	18%

=== Debates and Forums ===
2013 Seattle mayoral debate and candidate forums
No.	Date	Host	Moderator	Nonpartisan	Nonpartisan
Key: P Participant A Absent N Not invited I Invited W Withdrawn					
Key: P Participant A Absent N Not invited I Invited W Withdrawn				Michael McGinn	Ed Murray
1	September 17, 2013	Senior Center of West Seattle	Lucy Gaskill-Gaddis	P	P
2	September 26, 2013	Seattle Park's Foundation	C.R. Douglas	P	P
3	October 16, 2013	Immigrants, Refugees and Communities of Color United for Progress	Unknown	P	P

At the September 26 forum, McGinn outlined a proposal that would institute a tax of $.01 per ounce of soda. A similar tax had been instituted by the state legislature but was repealed in 2010 with the passage of Washington Measure 1107. McGinn and Murray clashed over a scandal in which Michael King, the executive director of the Senate Democratic Campaign Committee, was charged with embezzling $330,000 in campaign contributions. McGinn used the incident to attack Murray, who was a co-chair of the committee, while Murray apologized and sought to focus on issues rather than the scandal. McGinn had previously stated that he was not responsible for overseeing King's work, and that he and the other co-chairs of the committee turned the issue over to the authorities when they became aware of what was happening.

=== Results ===
In preliminary returns, Murray won 56 percent of votes. Although this amount was greater than the McGinn campaign could make up as voting continued McGinn declined to concede, saying his supporters wanted an additional day of counting.

On November 7 McGinn conceded to Murray and offered his congratulations.

Seattle Mayoral Election, 2013
Party	Candidate	Votes	%
Nonpartisan	Ed Murray	106,384	51.55
Nonpartisan	Michael McGinn	97,938	47.45
	Write-in	2,058	1.00
Plurality		8,446	4.09
Turnout		206,377	50.27
