= Oscar Milosz =

Author

Oscar Vladislas de Lubicz Milosz
- Oskaras Milašius
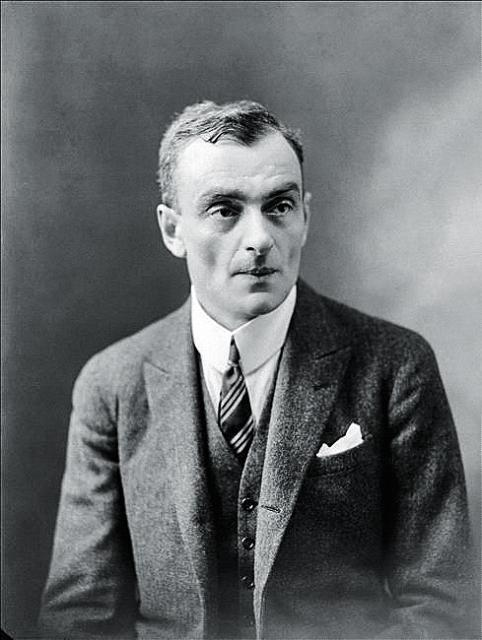
- Oscar Vladislas de Lubicz Milosz
- Born: Oskaras Milašius; 28 May 1877 or 15 May 1877; Čareja, Minsk Governorate, Russian Empire
- Died: 2 March 1939 (aged 61); Fontainebleau, France
- Education: École des langues orientales
- Occupations: Poet, playwright, diplomat

Oscar Vladislas de Lubicz Milosz (Lithuanian: Oskaras Milašius; Polish: Oskar Władysław Miłosz) (28 May 1877 or 15 May 1877 – 2 March 1939) was a French language poet, playwright, novelist, essayist and representative of Lithuania at the League of Nations. His literary career began at the end of the 19th century during la Belle Époque and reached its high point in the mid-1920s with the books Ars Magna and Les Arcanes, in which he developed a highly personal and dense Christian cosmogony comparable to that of Dante in The Divine Comedy and John Milton in Paradise Lost. A solitary and unique twentieth-century metaphysician, his poems are visionary and often tormented. He was a distant cousin of Polish writer Czesław Miłosz, winner of the Nobel Prize in Literature in 1980.

== Life ==
I am a Lithuanian poet, writing in French

— Oscar Milosz

Oscar Milosz was born in Čareja (Chereya), then Minsk Governorate, Russian Empire, former Grand Duchy of Lithuania, now in modern-day Belarus, where he also spent his childhood.

Oscar Milosz's father, Vladislas de Lubicz Milosz, was ethnically Lithuanian, nominally Catholic, and for a time an officer in the imperial Russian army. His mother, Marie Rosalie Rosenthal, was Jewish, the daughter of a Hebrew professor at the University of Warsaw. The family spoke Polish at home. Oscar was baptized a Catholic on 2 July 1886, at St. Alexander's Church in Warsaw. In 1889, when he was 12, his parents placed him at the Lycée Janson de Sailly in Paris. He began writing poems in 1894 and started to frequent artistic circles, meeting Oscar Wilde and Jean Moréas. After finishing at the Lycée, he enrolled at the École des langues orientales, where he studied Syriac and Hebrew.

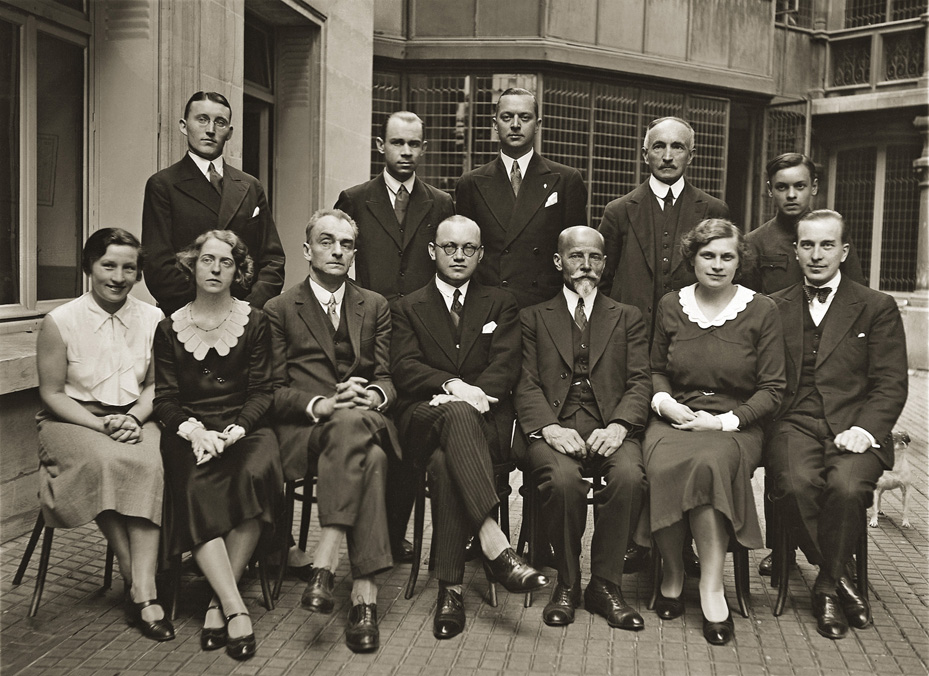
Oscar Milosz with the personnel of Representation of Lithuania in Paris

His first book of verse, Le Poème des Décadences, appeared in 1899. In the first years of the twentieth century, Milosz travelled widely in Europe and North Africa and explored many foreign literatures. In Jean-Bellemin Noël's phrase, "a European poet of the French language," Milosz was an excellent linguist and was fluent in French, Polish, Russian, English, German, Italian, and Spanish as well as being able to read Latin and Hebrew. Later in life, he would master written and spoken Lithuanian and studied Basque.

Milosz published his second poetry collection, the more accomplished Les Sept Solitudes, in 1906. He then entered into a phase of literary experimentation during which he tried his hand at a novel, L'Amoureuse Initiation, published in 1910, and three "mystery dramas," the most popular of these plays being Miguel Mañara (1913), a reworking of the Don Juan myth. During this time he also composed his third poetry collection, Les Éléments (1911).

"Come, I will lead you in spirit towards a strange, misty, veiled, murmuring land. A beat of our wings, and we shall fly over a country where all things bear the dull colour of memory. An odor of lilies, a mist of mouldering forest surrounds us. It is Lietuva, the land of Gediminas and Jogaila."

— Oscar Milosz, 1919, an example of his patriotic texts about Lithuania and its history.

On 14 December 1914, while saying his prayers at the end of an evening of intensive reading of the Bible and Emanuel Swedenborg, Milosz experienced an illumination that led him to proclaim the next day to a friend: "I have seen the spiritual sun." Influenced by this vision, his poetry became more profound. He began to study the Kabbalah, Renaissance and Baroque alchemists, and thinkers like Paracelsus and Jacob Boehme. After 1916, the development of his metaphysics became his major poetic preoccupation. He began to develop a literary cosmogonic system in the tradition of Lucretius, Dante, John Milton, William Blake, and Edgar Allan Poe and exposed it for the first time in the essay Épitre à Storge, published in La Revue de Hollande in 1917. In the early 1920s, Milosz convinced himself that his poetic cosmogony was supported by Einstein's theory of relativity, still a subject of debate. During this period, after a flirtation with "occult" reading and friends, like the numerologist René Schwaller de Lubicz, Milosz turned his back on these currents of thought and began to study medieval science and thinkers like the English scholastic Robert Grosseteste. Finally, in 1927 he took a Father Confessor and became a practicing Roman Catholic, which he remained for the last twelve years of his life.

In 1916, during World War I, Milosz was conscripted to the Russian division of the French army and was assigned to the press corps. After the Russian Revolution of October 1917, Čareja was seized by the Soviets. Suddenly, access to his family fortune was cut off and Milosz needed to earn a living. Around this time he learned about the growing movement for Lithuanian independence. By the end of the war when both Lithuania and Poland were effectively independent again, Milosz chose to identify with Lithuania - even though he did not yet speak Lithuanian — because he believed that it had been the original homeland of his ancestors in and prior to the 13th century. In 1920 when France recognized the independence of Lithuania, he was officially appointed Chargé d'Affaires for the new state. Milosz's diplomatic career remains one of the more fascinating aspects of his legacy; his articles and correspondence in the service of the reborn Lithuanian state show a high level of nuance and rigor. In 1931 he acquired French nationality by naturalization and was awarded the Légion d'honneur.

In 1939, shortly after retiring from his diplomatic post and ill with cancer, he died of a heart attack in a house he had recently purchased in Fontainebleau. He is buried in the cemetery at Fontainebleau. Every year, around the time of his birthday on May 28, a group of admirers, Les Amis de Milosz, commemorate his life and work in a ceremony at the grave site.

He has also been commemorated with an artistic plaque on Literatų Street, Vilnius, Lithuania, where a display of memorabilia is dedicated to notable writers who share connections with Lithuania or its capital.

== Works ==
Milosz was largely neglected during his lifetime. He has increasingly, however, come to be considered an important figure in French poetry. In a 1926 letter to James Chouvet, he writes:

"... [my] studies have taught me the only thing they could. Namely, that the truth is one, and that some respect and love are enough to discover it in the depths of our consciousness."

As well as being a writer, Milosz edited three books of Lithuanian folk tales and songs.

Some of his works in French:

- 1899: Le Poème des Décadences (poetry)
- 1906: Les Sept Solitudes (poetry)
- 1910: L'Amoureuse Initiation (novel)
- 1911: Les Éléments (poetry)
- 1913: Miguel Mañara. Mystère en six tableaux. (play)
- 1914 Les Zborowski (novel, first published in 1982)
- 1915: Poèmes
- 1917: Épitre à Storge (first part of Ars Magna)
- 1918: Adramandoni (six poems)
- 1919: Méphisobeth (play)
- 1922: La Confession de Lemuel
- 1924: Ars Magna (poetry-philosophy)
- 1926–1927: Les Arcanes (poetry-philosophy)
- 1930: Contes et Fabliaux de la vieille Lithuanie (translation of folk tales)
- 1932: Origines ibériques du peuple juif (essay)
- 1933: Contes lithuaniens de ma Mère l'Oye (translation of folk tales)
- 1936: Les Origines de la nation lithuanienne (essay)
- 1938: La Clef de l'Apocalypse

Works translated into English:

- Collection of 26 Lithuanian songs (1928)
- Lithuanian Tales and Stories (1930)
- Lithuanian Tales (1933)
- The Origins of the Lithuanian Nation in which he tried to persuade the reader that Lithuanians have the same origin as Jews from the Iberian Peninsula (1937)
- The Fourteen Poems of O.V. De L. Milosz, translated by Kenneth Rexroth with illustrations by Edward Hagedorn (1952)
- The Noble Traveller: The Life and Writings of Oskar Milosz, ed. Christopher Bamford (Lindisfarne Press) (1985)
- Poems of Milosz, translated by David Gascoyne (Enitharmon Pamphlets, 1993); reprinted in Selected Verse Translations, David Gascoyne (Enitharmon Press, 1996)
- Miguel Manara, with Commentary by Luigi Giussani, translated by Edo Morlin-Visconti (Human Adventure Books)

Opera based on his poems:

- Books of Silence, composer - Latvian Andris Dzenitis (2004)
