= Beyond the Mountains =

Beyond the Mountains may refer to:

- Beyond the Mountains (film), a 1967 American-Spanish dramatic adventure film directed by Alexander Ramati
- Beyond the Mountains (play), a play by Kenneth Rexroth
- Beyond the Mountains and Hills, a 2016 Israeli drama film directed by Eran Kolirin
