= ParentMap =

American parenting magazine

- Categories: Parenting
- Frequency: Monthly
- First issue: April 2003; 23 years ago
- Company: ParentMap
- Country: United States
- Based in: Seattle
- Language: English
- Website: www.parentmap.com
- OCLC: 52150073

ParentMap is a free monthly news magazine for parents in the Puget Sound area of the Pacific Northwest of the United States, published since April 2003. The magazine is available at various locations throughout the Puget Sound and also offers mail delivery via subscription.

ParentMap publishes daily website articles related to various parenting topics, including Out & About, Baby, Health, Education, and Food & Home. The website also offers a searchable online events calendar for family-related activities, as well as a family directory, where parents can search for local businesses and classes that cater to families. Readers can subscribe to the ParentMap eNews weekly email newsletters to learn about the latest articles and events.

ParentMap sponsors a yearly lecture series for parents (called ParentEd Talks), and publishes several special periodicals, including Seattle Baby Guide and Eastside Baby Guide, designed for expectant and new parents, plus supplements that focus on education and winter & summer activities. ParentMap also publishes parenting books.

== Superheroes ==
Every year ParentMap recognizes changemakers making a difference for kids and families in Washington.

- Stephanie McClintock, (2024)
- John Lovick, (2023)
- Trish Millines Dziko, (2023), (2009)
- My-Linh Thai, (2023)
- Kristin Rowe-Finkbeiner, (2023), (2008)
- Jamie Margolin, (2020)
- Donald Byrd (2020)
- Xbox Adaptive Controller Team, (2019)
- Tree Swenson, (2019)
- T'wina Nobles, (2018)
- Cyrus Habib, (2018)
- Joey Thomas, (2018)
- Adrian Z. Diaz, (2017)
- Ludovic Morlot, (2017)
- Ana Mari Cauce, (2016)
- Fred Rivara, (2016)
- Clarence Acox Jr., (2016)
- Kay Bullitt, (2014)
- Andrew N. Meltzoff, (2014)
- Patricia K. Kuhl, (2014)
- Marcus Tsutakawa, (2013)
- Tricia Raikes, (2012)
- Sherman Alexie, (2012)
- Penny Simkin, (2012)
- Karen Bryant, (2011)
- Roberto Maestas, (2011)
- Dan Savage, (2011)
- Eric Pettigrew, (2010)
- Kathryn Barnard, (2010)
- Eric Liu, (2010)
- Benjamin Danielson, (2009)
- Mary Lou Dickerson, (2009)
- Ruth Kagi, (2008)
