= Tricia Raikes =

American businesswoman and philanthropist

- Occupations: Co-founder, co-president of the Raikes Foundation
- Board member of: College Success Foundation, Jeffrey S. Raikes School of Computer Science and Management at the University of Nebraska-Lincoln
- Spouse: Jeff Raikes
- Children: Michaela, Connor, and Gillian
- Website: http://raikesfoundation.org/tricia-raikes

Tricia Raikes is an American businesswoman and philanthropist. She is the co-founder and co-president of the Raikes Foundation, and has held this position since 2002. Her husband is Jeff Raikes, former CEO of the Bill & Melinda Gates Foundation.

== Career ==
Prior to co-founding the Raikes Foundation, Raikes was Director of Creative Services and Marketing Communications at Microsoft. She holds a position on the board of directors for the College Success Foundation for Washington, D.C., and Washington state. Additionally, Raikes serves on the board of directors for the Jeffrey S. Raikes School of Computer Science and Management at the University of Nebraska–Lincoln with her husband Jeff Raikes. She has held other leadership roles, working with Stanford University's Task Force on Undergraduate Education, and serving the United Way of King County as the co-chair of their 2006-2007 campaign. Additionally, Raikes has served on boards for the Washington State University Foundation and the King County Boys & Girls Club.

Tricia has been recognized as one of the Puget Sound Business Journal's Women of Influence in 2007, named the 2012 ParentMap Humanitarian Superhero, and selected as one of the White House's Champions of Change for her work addressing youth homelessness.
