= Andrée Rexroth =

American artist

Andrée Schafer Rexroth
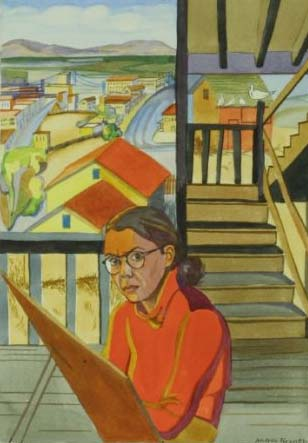
- self portrait
- Born: 1902; Chicago, Illinois
- Died: September 17, 1940 (aged 37–38); San Francisco, California

Andrée Rexroth (1902 – 17 October 1940) was an American artist.

In the 1920s she married the poet Kenneth Rexroth. In 1927, the couple hitchhiked and camped their way from Indiana to San Francisco, California, where they settled. In the 1930s, she took part in the Works Progress Administration initiative to employ artists during the Great Depression. In 1936, she was part of the group exhibition New Horizons in American Art at the Museum of Modern Art, New York. She died from complications of an epileptic seizure in 1940, aged 38. Following her death, Kenneth Rexroth wrote five poems in her memory.

Her work is included in the collections of the Smithsonian American Art Museum and the Fine Arts Museums of San Francisco.
