= Liam Rector =

American poet (1949–2007)

- Born: Ronald Edward Rector; November 21, 1949; Washington, D.C., U.S.
- Died: August 15, 2007 (aged 57); New York City, U.S.
- Education: Johns Hopkins University (MA); Harvard Kennedy School of Government (MPA)
- Occupations: Poet; educator
- Spouses: Tree Swenson
- Children: 1
- Writing career
- Notable awards: Guggenheim Fellow (1985)

Liam Rector (born Ronald Edward Rector; November 21, 1949 – August 15, 2007) was an American poet, essayist and educator. He had administered literary programs at the Association of Writers and Writing Programs (AWP), the National Endowment for the Arts, the Academy of American Poets, and the Folger Shakespeare Library. He was also the founder of the graduate Writing Seminars program at Bennington College.

== Life and work ==
Liam's class was one of my favorite experiences at the New School, as I'm sure it was for many others. He was a wonderful man and a terrific poet and teacher. I remember hearing him read at a PSA reading. He read last, I was bored and tired, and he blew the doors off the place. He just exuded a poetic gravitas, and I know few poets who read with such grace and class. I'll miss him.

Steve Roberts

Ronald Edward Rector was born in Washington, D.C.; he adopted the name Liam in adulthood. He was educated at various undergraduate programs but did not receive a bachelor's degree; he did, however, receive master's degrees in writing from Johns Hopkins University and in public administration from the Harvard Kennedy School. He was the author of volumes of poetry including The Executive Director of the Fallen World (University of Chicago, 2006), American Prodigal (Story Line, 1994), and The Sorrow of Architecture (Dragon Gate, 1984).

Rector was married three times, with the first two marriages ending in divorce; he had a daughter from his second marriage. With his third wife, Tree Swenson, he edited On the Poetry of Frank Bidart: Fastening the Voice to the Page (University of Michigan, 2007), and edited The Day I Was Older: On the Poetry of Donald Hall (Story Line, 1989).

Rector co-created (with poet Robert McDowell) a model for a low-residency MFA Program, and later founded and directed the graduate writing seminars at Bennington College in Vermont. He taught at Columbia University, The New School, and Emerson College.

Rector committed suicide by gunshot in his Greenwich Village apartment on August 15, 2007, at the age of 57. He had incurred a series of health problems in his last years, including heart disease and cancer, and mentioned this in his suicide note.

== Legacy ==
The Liam Rector First Book Prize for Poetry is awarded annually by Briery Creek Press to honor the best emerging poets with their first full-length poetry publication.

== Bibliography ==
=== Poetry ===
- The Sorrow of Architecture: Poems. Port Townsend, WA: Dragon Gate, 1984.
- American Prodigal: Poems. Brownsville, OR: Story Line Press, 1994.
- The Executive Director of the Fallen World. Chicago: University of Chicago Press, 2006.

=== Editor ===
- The Day I Was Older: On the poetry of Donald Hall. Santa Cruz, CA: Story Line Press, 1989.
- On Frank Bidart: Fastening the voice to the page (edited with Tree Swenson). Ann Arbor, MI: University of Michigan Press, 2007.
