= Les Arcanes =

Published in 1927, Les Arcanes is the second of Oskar Milosz's two cosmological poems, the first being Ars Magna (1924).

Upon the publication of Les Arcanes, Milosz declared that his poetic period was completed and that the "scientific" period of his work was beginning. Milosz wrote only one other poem, the short Le Psaume de l'étoile du matin, in 1938.
