= Edward Hagedorn (artist) =

American artist (1902–1982)

- Born: January 26, 1902; Oakland, California, U.S.
- Died: December 14, 1982 (aged 80); Berkeley, California, U.S.
- Education: San Francisco Art Association; California School of Fine Arts
- Known for: Painting

Edward Hagedorn (1902–1982) was an American artist, living most of his life in California. He painted and made prints, and was influenced by German Expressionism as well as Surrealism.

== Biography ==
Hagedorn was born on January 26, 1902, in Oakland, California, the son of Henry and Edna (née Kafka) Hagedorn. His mother died in childbirth, and he was raised by his maternal grandmother and by his aunt, Grace Kafka. At the age of 16, he enrolled in the San Francisco Art Association, and from 1923 to 1926 attended the California School of Fine Arts. Around 1930 he may have moved to New York for a brief period. He participated in numerous exhibitions from the late 1920s through the 1930s, and won honors from the Pennsylvania Academy and the Brooklyn Museum. Despite these successes, he did not take advantage of offers from museum curators and art dealers that may have increased his fame. After receiving a substantial inheritance in the late 1930s, he stopped exhibiting his work publicly. In the catalog to a 1996 exhibition at the University of California, Berkeley, museum curator James Steward wrote: "The spirit went out of much of his work from about 1940, and although Hagedorn continued to make art throughout most of his life, it often devolved into trivializing depictions of the female nude."

He died on December 14, 1982, in Berkeley, California.

== Illustration ==
Hagedorn illustrated The Fourteen Poems of O.V. De L. Milosz, translated by Kenneth Rexroth and published in 1952.

== Selected solo exhibitions ==
- 1938 - M. H. DeYoung Memorial Art Museum (September - October)
- 1941 - San Francisco Museum of Art (April 7–23)
- 1994 - Couturier Gallery, Los Angeles
- 1996 - University of California, Berkeley Art Museum (July 15 – August 20)
- 1996 - Salisbury State College, Salisbury, Maryland (October 11 – November 3)
- 2016 - Danforth Art Museum, Framingham, Massachusetts (March 16 – May 15)

== Public collections (partial list) ==
- Brooklyn Museum of Art, Brooklyn, New York
- Chicago Art Institute, Chicago, Illinois
- Library of Congress, Washington, D.C.
- Oakland Museum, Oakland, California
- San Diego Museum, San Diego, California
- Whitney Museum of American Art, New York, New York

One of Hagedorn's etchings was included in the 2011 exhibition “Francisco Goya: Los Caprichos,” at the Nassau County Museum of Art, New York. Martha Schwendener, an art critic for The New York Times, described the work, saying it took "Goya’s image of one goblin, representing a corrupt person, cutting another’s toenails, and redrew it to resonate with the Wall Street crash of 1929."
