= Jeff Raikes =

Co-founder of the Raikes Foundation

- Born: Jeffrey Scott Raikes; May 29, 1958 (age 68); Ashland, Nebraska United States
- Education: Stanford University
- Board member of: Stanford University Board of Trustees, Costco Wholesale, Hudl, University of Nebraska–Lincoln Jeffrey S. Raikes School of Computer Science and Management, Giving Tech Labs
- Spouse: Tricia Raikes
- Children: 3

Jeffrey Scott Raikes (born May 29, 1958) is the co-founder of the Raikes Foundation. He retired from his role as the chief executive officer of the Bill & Melinda Gates Foundation in 2014. He serves on the boards of Giving Tech Labs, Hudl, Costco Wholesale, the Jeffrey S. Raikes School of Computer Science and Management at the University of Nebraska–Lincoln, and the Microsoft Alumni Network. He is chair of the Stanford University board of trustees. Until early 2008, Raikes was the president of the Microsoft Business Division and oversaw the Information Worker, Server & Tools Business and Microsoft Business Solutions Groups. He joined Microsoft in 1981 as a product manager. He retired from Microsoft in September 2008, after a transitional period, to join the Gates Foundation.

== Early life ==
Raikes grew up in Ashland, Nebraska, graduating from Ashland-Greenwood High School in 1976. Raikes prepared to work for the US Department of Agriculture on agricultural policy while earning his Bachelor of Science degree in engineering-economics systems from Stanford University. It was while at Stanford that Raikes had his first exposure to computing, learning Pascal on a DEC System 20. The first computer he bought was an Apple II, which he used to help his brother, Ron Raikes, manage the family farm.

== Career ==
He joined Apple Computer as the VisiCalc Engineering Manager in 1980. He worked at Apple for fifteen months before being recruited to Microsoft by Steve Ballmer in 1981 as a product manager. He was promoted to director of applications marketing in 1984 and was the chief strategist behind Microsoft's investments in graphical applications for the Apple Macintosh and the Microsoft Windows operating system. In this role, he drove the product strategy and design of Microsoft Office. Raikes was promoted to vice president of Office Systems, where he was responsible for development and marketing of word processing, workgroup applications and pen computing.

Raikes later held roles managing North American operations, and worldwide sales, marketing, and services. In 2000, he was appointed to lead Productivity and Business Services, which later became the Information Worker business at Microsoft. He was named a company president in 2005.

On May 12, 2008, it was announced that Raikes would replace Patty Stonesifer as the CEO of the Bill & Melinda Gates Foundation; he stepped down in favor of Susan Desmond-Hellmann on May 1, 2014.

=== Sporting ventures ===
In 1992 the Pacific Northwest was in danger of losing the Seattle Mariners Major League Baseball franchise. Raikes joined with other local business leaders to purchase the team, keeping them "safe at home" for the enjoyment of Northwest baseball fans.

== Philanthropy ==
Raikes has a wide range of philanthropic interests. He and his wife are co-founders of the Raikes Foundation. He is a trustee at the University of Nebraska Foundation, funded a professorship in agronomy, and was a designer of the University of Nebraska–Lincoln Jeffrey S. Raikes School of Computer Science and Management. He has been active in United Way for several years. In 2006–2007, he co-chaired the annual campaign of United Way of King County with his wife, setting a national record for funds raised.

Raikes is a major donor to the Center for Comparative Studies in Race and Ethnicity at Stanford University where he also established the Jeff and Tricia Raikes Undergraduate Scholarship Fund to ensure that students admitted to Stanford from rural and inner-city schools have an opportunity to attend the university. He was selected as a trustee of the university in 2012 and in 2017 was elected chair.

In June 2008, Raikes donated approximately $10 million to the University of Nebraska–Lincoln's JD Edwards Honors Program, which officially changed its name to the Jeffrey S. Raikes School of Computer Science and Management shortly thereafter.

In July 2017, Jeff Raikes and his wife Tricia Raikes inspired the creation of Giving Tech Labs and joined their board.

== Personal life ==
Raikes and his wife, Tricia Raikes née McGinnis, have three children: Michaela, Connor, and Gillian.
