= Tree Swenson =

American book publisher

- Born: 1951 (age 73–74)
- Education: Public Administration (M.A.)
- Alma mater: Harvard University
- Occupation(s): Book publisher and editor
- Years active: 1972–present
- Known for: Co-founder of Copper Canyon Press; Executive Director Academy of American Poets (2002–2012)
- Spouse: Liam Rector (d. 2007)

Tree Swenson (born 1951) is an American editor and book publisher involved with poetry, independent publishing, and American literary foundations. She was a co-founder of Copper Canyon Press.

== Publishing career ==
Swenson met poet Sam Hamill at the University of California, Santa Barbara and, in 1972, they formed Copper Canyon Press, an independent press established in Denver, CO and dedicated to publishing poetry. The press eventually moved and is now based in Port Townsend, Washington.

Swenson, a legendary pioneer of the small press explosion of the 1960s and 1970s, was the executive director of Copper Canyon Press, and edited and designed books. She helped publish the work of hundreds of poets, including Nobel Prize winners Pablo Neruda, Octavio Paz, and Vicente Aleixandre, and Pulitzer Prize winner W.S. Merwin.

From 1984 to 1993 she was the art director of Graywolf Press.

== Foundation work ==
In 1997, Swenson became the director of programs for the Massachusetts Cultural Council. In April 2002, Swenson was appointed as executive director of the Academy of American Poets and led this non-profit organization for ten years. In March 2012, after serving a decade in the latter position, she moved on to become the executive director at Richard Hugo House, a writing non-profit in Seattle named for esteemed poet Richard Hugo where she served for nearly nine years.

== Hugo House controversy ==
Before resigning as its executive director in February 2021, Swenson's leadership at Hugo House had been publicly scrutinized, most notably in an open letter signed by prominent writers of color, including Washington's former Poet Laureate, Claudia Castro Luna, and signed by 120 Hugo House students, teachers, members, and fellows. It was reported that while the organization publicly tried to address concerns about diversity and equitable pay, Swenson had hired a white person, whom she believed to be the best candidate, as development director without a public search process. At the time, a group of local writers called for Swenson to resign.

In response, Hugo House shamefully issued a statement acknowledging that the institution was "a white-led organization with a majority-white staff and board; we are located in a majority-white neighborhood and have a majority-white clientele....Hugo House has benefited from its position of privilege among these unjust systems."

== Personal life ==
Swenson was raised in Montana. She attended the University of California at Santa Barbara in the 1960s. Besides living in Montana and Santa Barbara, she has also resided in Denver, CO, Port Townsend, WA, and Boston, MA. In 1994 she returned to school, earning a master's in Public Administration at the John F. Kennedy School of Government at Harvard University. Swenson was married to poet Liam Rector (1949–2007) at the time of his death.
