= Love and the Turning Year =

Collection of translated Chinese poetry

Love and the Turning Year: One Hundred More Poems from the Chinese is a collection of translations of Chinese poetry by Kenneth Rexroth, first published in 1970. The book contains poetry translations from the Han dynasty on, including a section with a number of anonymous Six Dynasties poems. As is the case with his earlier book One Hundred Poems from the Chinese, Rexroth's Love and the Turning Year: One Hundred More Poems from the Chinese actually contains somewhat more than one hundred poems.

== See also ==
- Classical Chinese poetry
- One Hundred Poems from the Chinese
