= One Hundred Poems from the Chinese =

One Hundred Poems from the Chinese is a collection of translations of Chinese poetry by Kenneth Rexroth, first published in 1956. The book is in two parts: the first contains 35 poems by Du Fu, while the second consists of works by assorted Song dynasty poets. The book actually contains over one hundred poems.

== See also ==
- Classical Chinese poetry
- One Hundred More Poems from the Chinese
