= Hugo House =

Writing center in Seattle, Washington, US

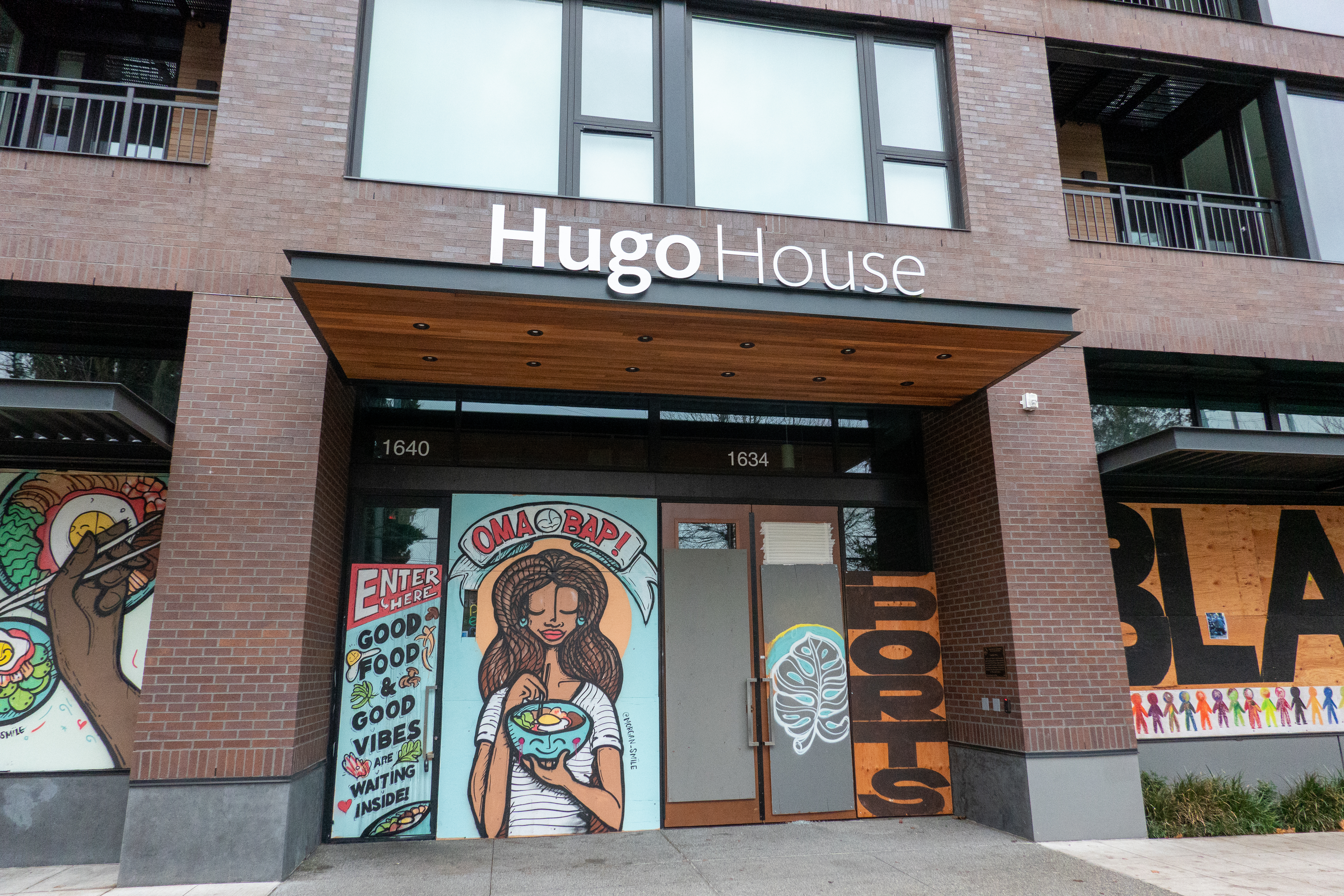
Richard Hugo House, 2020

Hugo House is a non-profit community writing center in Seattle, Washington.

== About ==
Hugo House was founded in 1997 by Linda Jaech, Frances McCue, and Andrea Lewis. These three writers believed Seattle needed a center for local writers and readers to find a community and create new work. In 1999, Laura Hirschfield described the nonprofit organization: "Richard Hugo House is a two-year-old literary arts center in Seattle named after the Seattle-born poet and creative writing teacher Richard Hugo who wrote squarely and poignantly about people and places often overlooked."

Several new programs were created at Hugo House during the 2000s by Program Director Brian McGuigan, including Cheap Wine and Poetry (in 2005) Cheap Beer and Prose (in 2008), and the Made at Hugo House fellowship. McGuigan left Hugo House in 2014.

Tree Swenson was the executive director of Hugo House from 2012 to 2020. The current Interim Executive Director is Rob Arnold.

== House ==
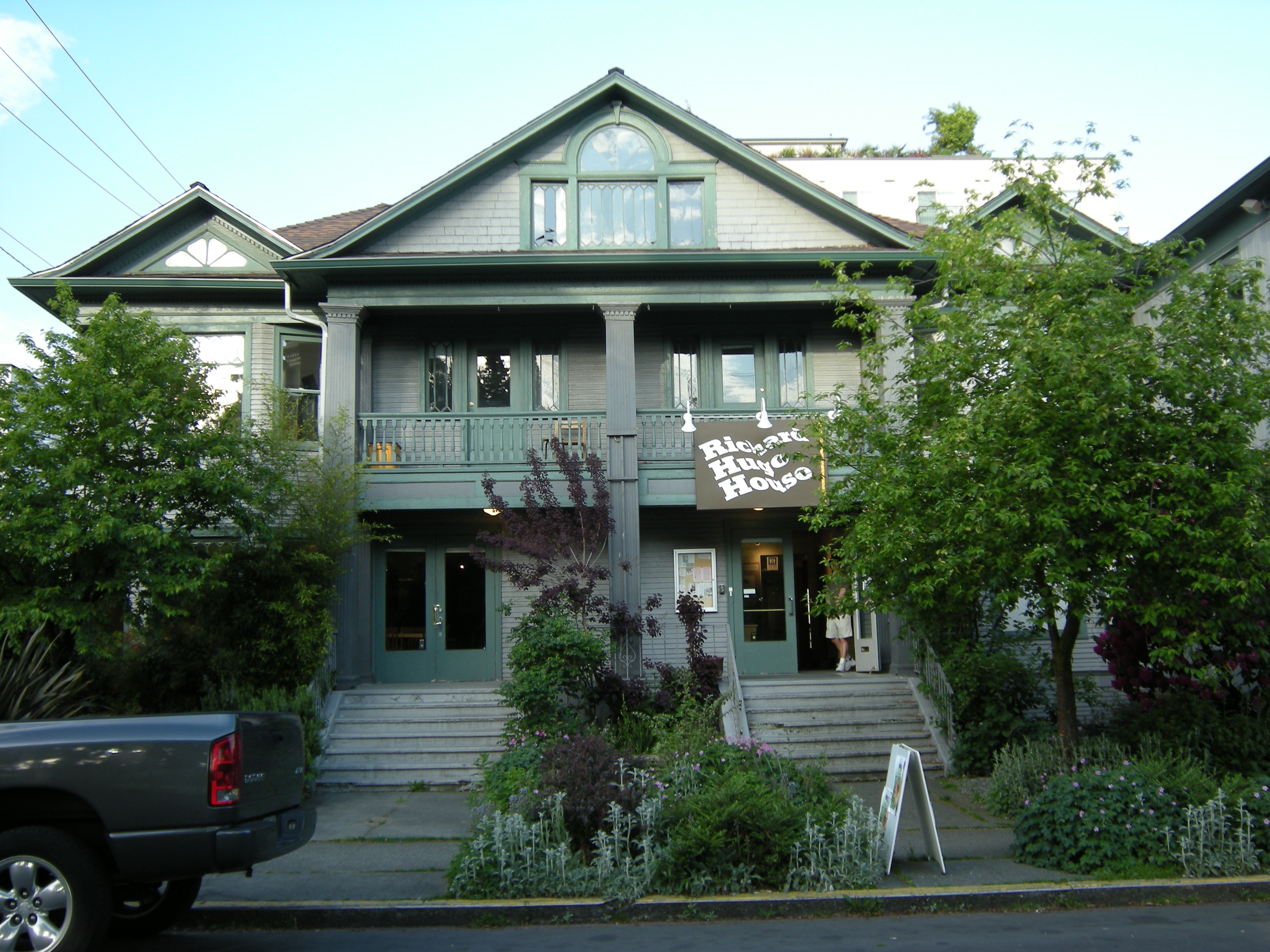
Original Richard Hugo House, 2008

Hugo House first occupied a Victorian house originally built in 1902.

In June 2016, the organization moved to a temporary space adjacent to the Frye Art Museum on First Hill when the original house on Capitol Hill was razed. The property was redeveloped with a six-story mixed-use building which, starting in September 2018, serves as the permanent home for Hugo House.

== Articles ==
- A Study in Social Entrepreneurship: Richard Hugo House, Laura Hirschfield, Grantmakers in the Arts Newsletter, Volume 10, Number 2, Autumn 1999
- All eyes on a timely topic at Hugo House, John Marshall, Seattle Post-Intelligencer, 10/4/2002,
- Open House, Christopher Frizzelle, The Stranger, 7/24/2003,
- Making Things Better, Frances McCue, Community Arts, 10/2004
- Not With a Bang, But a Whimper, Paul Constant, The Stranger, 9/16/2008
- Hugo House names interim director, John Marshall, Seattle PI, 10/23/2008
