= Trish Millines Dziko =

- Education: Monmouth College now Monmouth University
- Occupations: Software engineer and educator

Trish Millines Dziko (born 1957) is a software engineer and educator. She co-founded Technology Access Foundation that focuses on teaching STEM concepts to underprivileged children of color.

== Early life and education ==
Dziko was born in 1957, and was adopted by Pat Millines, who raised Dziko as a single mother in New Jersey. Millines stressed to Dziko the importance of a college education as she grew up. In Dziko's senior year of high school, she acted as a caretaker for her mother, who suffered from cancer of the liver and pancreas. One month before Dziko's high school graduation, her mother died.

Dziko was the first woman to be granted a full basketball scholarship from Monmouth College (now Monmouth University) in Monmouth, New Jersey and was the first of her family to get a college education. Dziko received her B.S. in Computer Science from Monmouth College in 1979.

== Career ==
After graduating from Monmouth College, Dziko started working at the Computer Sciences Corporation in New Jersey, where she worked to develop software to test new military radar systems. In January 1985, she moved to Seattle, where she worked at Telecalc as manager of the testing department.

In 1988, Dziko began working at Microsoft Inc. in Redmond, Washington. Dziko spent almost nine years as an employee at Microsoft, promoting and advocating for diversity in corporate life. Dziko worked as the Senior Diversity Administrator for Microsoft, and, in 1995, she noted the lack of African American presence, as well as other people of color within the tech industry. She reasoned that this discrepancy could be accredited to their lack of access to technology and computers as students. During her time at Microsoft, she was part of the group that organized Blacks at Microsoft (BAM), which was the first company-led diversity organization. Dziko left Microsoft in 1996.

Dziko co-founded with Jill Hull the Technology Access Foundation (TAF), an organization based in Seattle that seeks to promote STEM skills to students of color. TAF employs an equity-driven STEM program that emphasizes critical thinking and project-based learning, integrating technology into instruction across all subjects. The organization fosters inclusive, nurturing environments by building strong relationships between teachers and students and connecting students with professionals in tech-related industries. Through its STEMbyTAF academic model, TAF aims to redefine STEM literacy and promote educational equality in communities of color and those with low income. She also promoted the tech internship program in the diverse neighborhood of Columbia City in Seattle. Dziko invested more than $150,000 in TAF, using the money she earned while working at Microsoft.

Since the opening of TAF Academy Dziko has continued to innovate the public school system. She also wrote a book about changes titled ‘This is the Work’.

== Awards and recognition ==
In 2001, she received an Honorary Doctor of Humane Letters from Seattle University for her significant contributions to promoting diversity within the tech industry and her work towards diversity at her workplace, the Technology Access Foundation. In 2012, Dziko received the US News 100 Women Leaders in STEM. In 2018, she received the Crosscut Courage Award in Technology. Dziko is 2009 and 2023 ParentMap Superhero.

== Personal life ==
Dziko was married to Jill Hull Dziko in 2013.
