= 2009 Seattle mayoral election =

- November 3, 2009
- Turnout: 54.99%
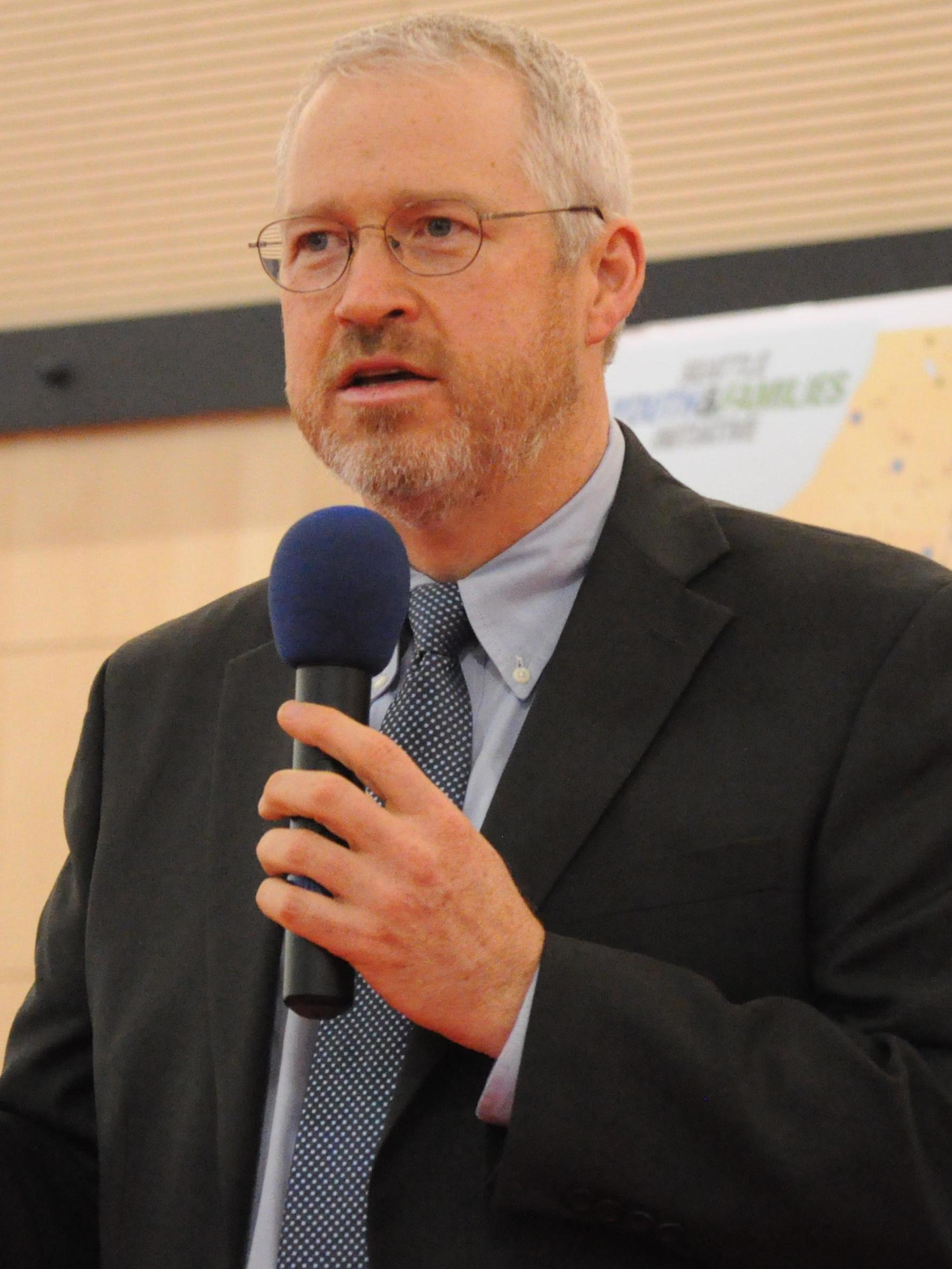

Candidate	Mike McGinn	Joe Mallahan
Party	Nonpartisan	Nonpartisan
Popular vote	105,492	98,302
Percentage	51.14%	47.65%
Mayor before election
Greg Nickels
Elected mayor
Mike McGinn

The 2009 Seattle mayoral election took place November 3, 2009. Incumbent Seattle Mayor Greg Nickels sought re-election to a third term as the position of Seattle mayor has no term limits but finished third in the August 18, 2009 nonpartisan primary election. The general election was instead between Joe Mallahan and Michael McGinn. McGinn beat Mallahan in the election with 51%.

== Background ==
In a November 2008 poll of likely Seattle voters, 31% of voters approved of Nickels's performance as mayor while 57% disapproved. A January 2009 poll found a net job approval of minus 33.

Nickels' administration was faulted for not doing enough to prevent the Seattle SuperSonics NBA franchise from relocating to Oklahoma City, Oklahoma. Nickels was also heavily criticized for the city's policy of not using salt for snow removal due to potential environmental concerns, which contributed to the city's congested traffic in December 2008 after one of the greatest snowfalls in the city since 1996. The Proposed replacement of the Alaskan Way Viaduct and a tax on plastic bags at grocery stores were also major issues of the campaign.

== Primary candidates (in alphabetic order) ==
- Elizabeth Campbell, Magnolia resident and activist
- James Donaldson, former Seattle SuperSonics player
- Jan Drago, Seattle City Councilwoman
- Kwame Garrett
- Joe Mallahan, telecommunications executive and political activist; Vice President for T-Mobile US
- Michael McGinn, Sierra Club leader and activist
- Greg Nickels, Seattle Mayor since 2001
- Norman Sigler, former Alaska Airlines manager

== Campaign finances ==
Candidate	Total contributions
Joe Mallahan	$806,378
Greg Nickels	$596,510
Mike McGinn	$222,570
Jan Drago	$157,993
James Donaldson	$51,906
Norman Zadok Sigler	$14,625
Elizabeth Campbell	$2,371
Kwame Wyking Garrett	$0

== Primaries ==
=== Early polling ===
A poll conducted on August 12 showed incumbent Greg Nickels in the lead with 24 percent voter backing. While Nickels had a significant lead over all other candidates, the undecided voter percentage of 26 percent indicated room for any candidate to take the lead in the primary held on August 18. In second place after Greg Nickels was Mike McGinn with 16 percent. And in third place, Joe Mallahan with 14 percent. The survey polled 500 people with a margin of error of + or - 4.3 percent.

=== Primary results ===
The primary election was held on August 18. The final results were posted on September 2, and showed Mike McGinn in first place with 27.7 percent of the popular vote, narrowly leading Joe Mallahan standing at 26.9 percent. Incumbent Greg Nickels showed with 25.4 percent. Due to Washington's top-two primary system, this eliminated Nickels from the running. Nickels gave his concession speech on August 21 at Seattle City Hall. Mallahan and McGinn advanced to the general election in November.

Primary election
Party	Candidate	Votes	%
Nonpartisan	Mike McGinn	39,097	27.71
Nonpartisan	Joe Mallahan	37,933	26.88
Nonpartisan	Greg Nickels (incumbent)	35,781	25.36
Nonpartisan	James Donaldson	11,478	8.13
Nonpartisan	Jan Drago	10,154	7.20
Nonpartisan	Elizabeth Campbell	3,485	2.47
Nonpartisan	Kwame Garett	1,479	1.05
Nonpartisan	Norman Sigler	1,247	0.88
Write-in	Others	461	0.33
Turnout		141,115	37.16

== General election ==
An October 20 poll commissioned by KING-TV and conducted by SurveyUSA showed Joe Mallahan ahead with 43% to Michael McGinn's 36% with a margin of error of 4.1%. Mallahan held a lead among college graduates, Democrats, Republicans, Independents and those describing themselves as moderates and conservatives. McGinn was shown to hold a lead among Asian-Americans, younger voters and those that describe themselves as liberals. McGinn changed his position on the Deep Bore Tunnel that same day, claiming "If I'm elected mayor, though I disagree with this decision, it will be my job to uphold and execute this agreement. It is not the mayor's job to withhold the cooperation of city government in executing this agreement." It was enough to push McGinn ahead of Mallahan by election day.

Mallahan conceded on November 9 after his deficit grew to nearly 5,000 votes.

General election
Party	Candidate	Votes	%
Nonpartisan	Mike McGinn	105,492	51.14
Nonpartisan	Joe Mallahan	98,302	47.65
Write-in	Others	2,492	1.21
Turnout		206,286	54.99
