= Maud Daudon =

Maud Smith Daudon
- Born: 1955 (age 70–71); Illinois, United States of America
- Occupations: Executive Leader, Career Connect Washington
- Known for: President and CEO of the Seattle Metropolitan Chamber of Commerce

Maud Smith Daudon is the Executive Leader of Career Connect Washington, which successfully passed legislation and state funding in spring of 2019 to implement the 10-year strategic plan for building a statewide career-connected learning and apprenticeship system in Washington State. Selected by Governor Inslee to lead this effort, Daudon is under contract with the Governor's Office and her work is funded by five philanthropic partners.

Prior to this, Daudon completed a six-year tenure as the president and CEO of the Seattle Metropolitan Chamber of Commerce in February 2018. The first woman appointed to lead the Chamber, Daudon is widely respected by business, community, and political leaders for her pragmatic, thoughtful, and solution-oriented approach. During her tenure at the Chamber, she championed the Chamber's commitment to the triple bottom line - advancing a strong economy, being good stewards of our natural and cultural assets, and ensuring that no one is left behind in the region's economic prosperity.

Daudon has also served as president and CEO of Seattle-Northwest Securities Corporation, deputy mayor of Seattle, and chief financial officer of the Port of Seattle. Daudon is active in several Seattle-based civic and community organizations including sitting on the boards of United Way of King County, The Nature Conservancy, and Virginia Mason Health System, and is a trustee and past chair of the Bullitt Foundation. She previously chaired the Washington Student Achievement Council.

== Early life and family ==
Daudon was born in Lake Forest, Illinois, just outside Chicago. She began participating in political and community programs at an early age, working alongside her parents who were heavily involved in organizations and campaigns including the United Way of Chicago and Planned Parenthood of Chicago.

Daudon graduated from Hampshire College in Amherst, Massachusetts, with a bachelor of arts. After receiving her undergraduate degree, she began working on a campaign to preserve downtown Corvallis, Oregon against the threat of an outside shopping center decreasing the city’s economic viability. This experience inspired her to pursue a degree in business and public management at the Yale School of Organization and Management.

She married Marc Daudon, a consultant to international, environmental groups and co-founder of Cascadia Consulting Group. They have two grown children and live in the Madrona neighborhood in Seattle.

== Career ==
In 1983, Daudon began working in the public finance division of Lehman Brothers. After three years in the New York City offices, Daudon joined Lehman Brothers in Seattle, where she worked regularly with the Port of Seattle.

This led to her six-year career and appointment as chief financial officer of the Port of Seattle, where Daudon worked regularly with Port commissioner Paul Schell, who later became mayor of Seattle.

In 1998, Schell appointed Daudon as his deputy mayor and chief of staff; a position she held until Schell lost reelection in 2001. As deputy mayor, Daudon focused on overall city strategy and helped manage various initiatives including the 1999 World Trade Organization Protests.

After Schell was not reelected, Daudon joined Seattle-Northwest Securities Corporation in 2002 and was appointed president and chief executive officer in 2006. During her ten years at Seattle-Northwest Securities, the company reached profitable margins.

In June 2012, Daudon was appointed as the president and chief executive officer of the Seattle Metropolitan Chamber of Commerce, advocating a theme of sustainable prosperity focused on infrastructure, education and health care. Primary initiatives included negotiating the nation’s first $15 minimum wage legislation, advocating for building a Seattle waterfront park and replacing the Alaskan Way Viaduct with a tunnel carrying Route 99 traffic through downtown Seattle, creating pathways for young people into great jobs in the regional economy and focusing on housing issues in light of a surge of growth in the Seattle region.

In February 2018, Governor Inslee announced Daudon would lead Career Connect Washington, a 10-year vision and strategic plan for building a statewide career-connected learning and apprenticeship system in Washington. As the coalition's leader, she works with business leaders, national experts, labor leaders, educators, parents, and students to utilize state and private resources to enable every Washington student an opportunity to have multiple pathways to college-level learning and career including though work-based learning experiences, such as apprenticeship.

She was recognized by the Puget Sound Business Journal as a Woman of Influence.

== Civic and philanthropic involvement ==
Throughout her career in Seattle, Daudon has held leadership appointments in community and economic development organizations, including:

Current Organizational Leadership (as of September 7, 2022):

- The Nature Conservancy of Washington
- United Way of King County
- Virginia Mason Health System
- Yale SOM West Coast Advisory Board

Past Organizational Leadership:

- Bullitt Foundation
- Washington Student Achievement Council
- Intiman Theatre
- World Affairs Council
- Bond Dealers of America
- Municipal Securities Rulemaking Board
- Governor’s Higher Ed Task Force
- Seattle Biomedical Research Institute
- Washington Aerospace Partnership
- City of Seattle’s Advisory Committee on Tolling and Traffic
- Seattle Metropolitan Chamber of Commerce
- Seattle’s Economic Development Commission
