= Beyond the Mountains (play) =

Play by Kenneth Rexroth

- Written by: Kenneth Rexroth

Premiere

Beyond the Mountains is a play by Kenneth Rexroth that was staged by The Living Theatre.
