= Sam Hamill =

American poet (1943–2018)

Sam Hamill (May 9, 1943 – April 14, 2018) was an American poet and the co-founder of Copper Canyon Press along with Bill O’Daly and Tree Swenson. He also initiated the Poets Against War movement (2003) in response to the Iraq War. In 2003 he did a poetic tour in Italy, organised by writer Alessandro Agostinelli. After that tour Hamill published his first Italian book A Pisan Canto - Un canto pisano.

Hamill was awarded the Stanley Lindberg Lifetime Achievement Award for Editing and the Washington Poets Association Lifetime Achievement Award.

Hamill's 2014 book Habitation: Collected Poems, presents some of Hamill's best poems spanning a career of over 40 years.

At the time of his death from complications of COPD in 2018, his final poetry collection After Morning Rain was about to be published.

== Poetry Books ==
- Gratitude: Poems [BOA Editions, Ltd. Rochester NY, 1988]
- Facing Snow: Visions of Tu Fu [White Pine Press, 1988] (Sam Hamill, translator)
- Crossing the Yellow River: Three Hundred T'ang Poems [Tiger Bark Press, 2013] (Sam Hamill, translator)
- Destination Zero: Poems 1970–1995 (1995).
- The Gift of Tongues: Twenty-Five Years of Poetry from Copper Canyon Press (1996, Copper Canyon Press)(Sam Hamill, editor)
- Almost Paradise: New and Selected Poems and Translations (2005).
- Measured by Stone (2007).
- A Pisan Canto - Un canto pisano (2008, Edizioni ETS, Italy)
- Habitation: Collected Poems (2014, University of Washington Press)
- After Morning Rain (2018, Tiger Bark Press)

In Anthology

- Ghost Fishing: An Eco-Justice Poetry Anthology (2018, University of Georgia Press)
- Seeds of Fire: Contemporary Poetry from the Other U.S.A. (2008, Smokestack Books)
