= Greg Nickels =

American politician (born 1955)

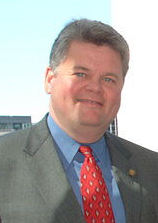

51st Mayor of Seattle
- In office January 1, 2002 – January 1, 2010
- Preceded by: Paul Schell
- Succeeded by: Michael McGinn

67th President of the United States Conference of Mayors
- In office 2009
- Preceded by: Manny Diaz
- Succeeded by: Elizabeth Kautz

Member of the King County Council from the 8th district
- In office January 1, 1988 – January 1, 2002
- Preceded by: Bob Greive
- Succeeded by: Dow Constantine

Personal details
- Born: Gregory James Nickels; August 7, 1955 (age 71) Chicago, Illinois, U.S.
- Party: Democratic
- Spouse: Sharon Nickels
- Children: 2
- Education: University of Washington (attended)

Gregory James Nickels (born August 7, 1955) is an American politician who served as the 51st mayor of Seattle, Washington, and as of 2025 is the last Seattle mayor who has served more than one term in office. He took office on January 1, 2002, and was reelected to a second term in 2005. In August 2009, Nickels finished third in the primary election for Seattle mayor, failing to qualify for the November 2009 general election, and losing his bid for a third term as mayor. He left office on January 1, 2010.

== Early life and education ==
Nickels, the oldest of six siblings, was born in Chicago to Bob and Kathie Nickels. In 1961, his family moved to Seattle, where he graduated from St. Joseph's Catholic Primary School and the Jesuit Seattle Preparatory School. He attended the University of Washington but left before graduating to pursue his passion for politics.

== Career ==
Nickels was legislative assistant to Seattle City Council member and future mayor Norm Rice from 1979 to 1987. Nickels was elected to the King County Council in 1987, defeating longtime incumbent Bob Grieve, and reelected in 1991, 1995 and 1999. In 2001, he was elected Mayor of Seattle (defeating Seattle City Attorney Mark Sidran) and was re-elected in 2005. Nickels ran for a third term in 2009, but he failed to advance to the general election after coming in third place in the primary election held in August 2009. He had several notable events during his tenure as mayor of Seattle. In 2003, he helped to break ground for the Sound Transit Link light rail project in November, and signed an executive order in 2004 giving equal rights to everyone who is married and works for Seattle city government regardless of sexual orientation.

Nickels' popularity began to decline in July 2008, when the Seattle SuperSonics NBA franchise relocated to Oklahoma City, Oklahoma after a lawsuit against the team's ownership group was settled out of court – an outcome in which Nickels' administration, as well as Washington State lawmakers were faulted by many Seattle sports fans for not doing enough to keep the team in Seattle.

In December 2008, Nickels was criticized after an unusual snowstorm blanketed the city with the greatest snowfalls it had seen since 1996. The Seattle "snowpack", which began accumulating on December 13, did not melt until December 27, the longest period of time snow had remained on the ground in Seattle since the mid-1980s. Seattle did not use salt to clear its roads, citing environmental concerns, which led to severe problems with the city's public transit system.

Due to disapproval of Nickels' handling of illegal tent cities in Seattle, a tent city community in the Seattle area was known colloquially as "Nickelsville".

A late 2008 poll of likely Seattle voters reflected dissatisfaction with the incumbent mayor, showing that 31% approved of Nickels's performance as mayor while 57% disapproved. Nickels' low popularity numbers did not recover by August 2009, when he was defeated in the primary election in his bid for a third term as Seattle's mayor. In Nickels' concession defeat, he thanked Seattle voters and noted, "Twice they gave me the honor of doing this. They want a new generation of leadership."

Shortly before his defeat in his re-election campaign he had been appointed the 67th President of the United States Conference of Mayors earlier in 2009. With his defeat Elizabeth Kautz filled the remainder of his term until 2010. Nickels left Seattle to pursue a teaching position at Harvard University.

In 2012, Nickels ran for Washington Secretary of State as a Democrat. He received 15.85% for third place in the August 7 top-two primary, behind Kathleen Drew (D) and Kim Wyman (R).

== Affiliations ==
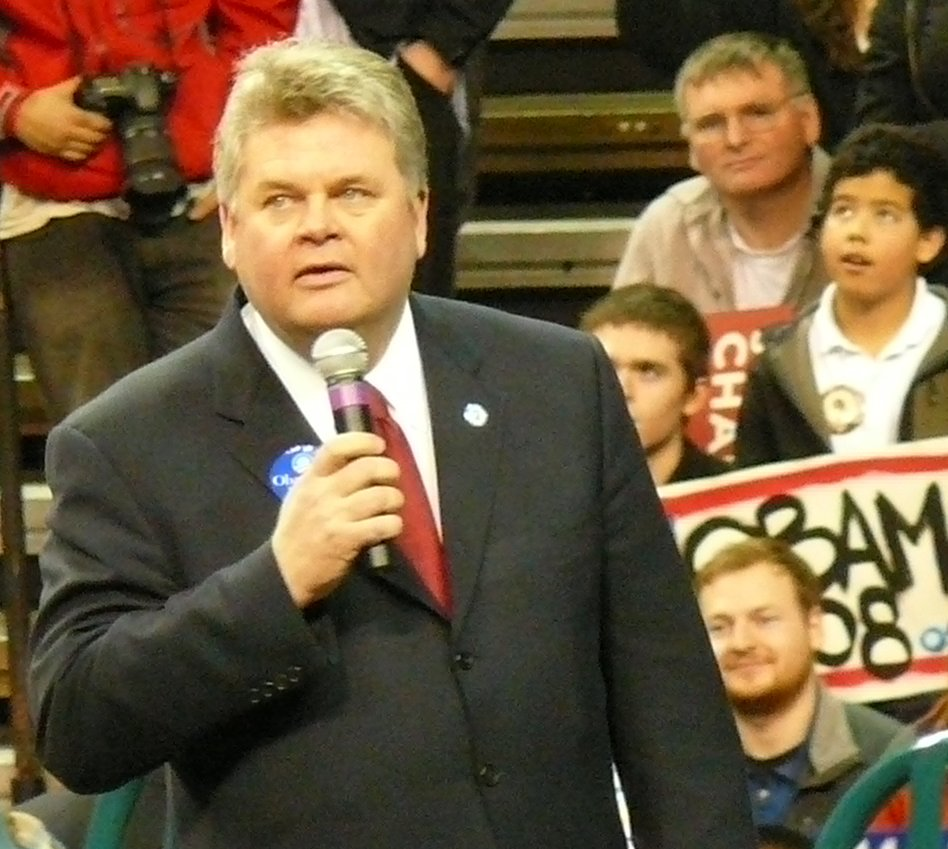
Nickels at a 2008 rally for Barack Obama

Nickels is a member of the Washington State Democratic Party and served as the President of the United States Conference of Mayors, but left that post on the day he left office as Seattle mayor. Nickels served on the board of directors of Sound Transit. Since 2003, he has also been the chair of the Transportation and Communications Committee of the U.S. Conference of Mayors and served on the Conference's Board of Trustees.

Nickels is a member of the Mayors Against Illegal Guns Coalition, a bi-partisan group with a stated goal of "making the public safer by getting illegal guns off the streets." The Coalition is co-chaired by former Boston Mayor Thomas Menino and former New York City Mayor Michael Bloomberg.

He was the key negotiator for the City of Seattle in accepting $45 million up front from the Bennett Group to move the Seattle SuperSonics of the NBA to Oklahoma City.

== Environmental record ==
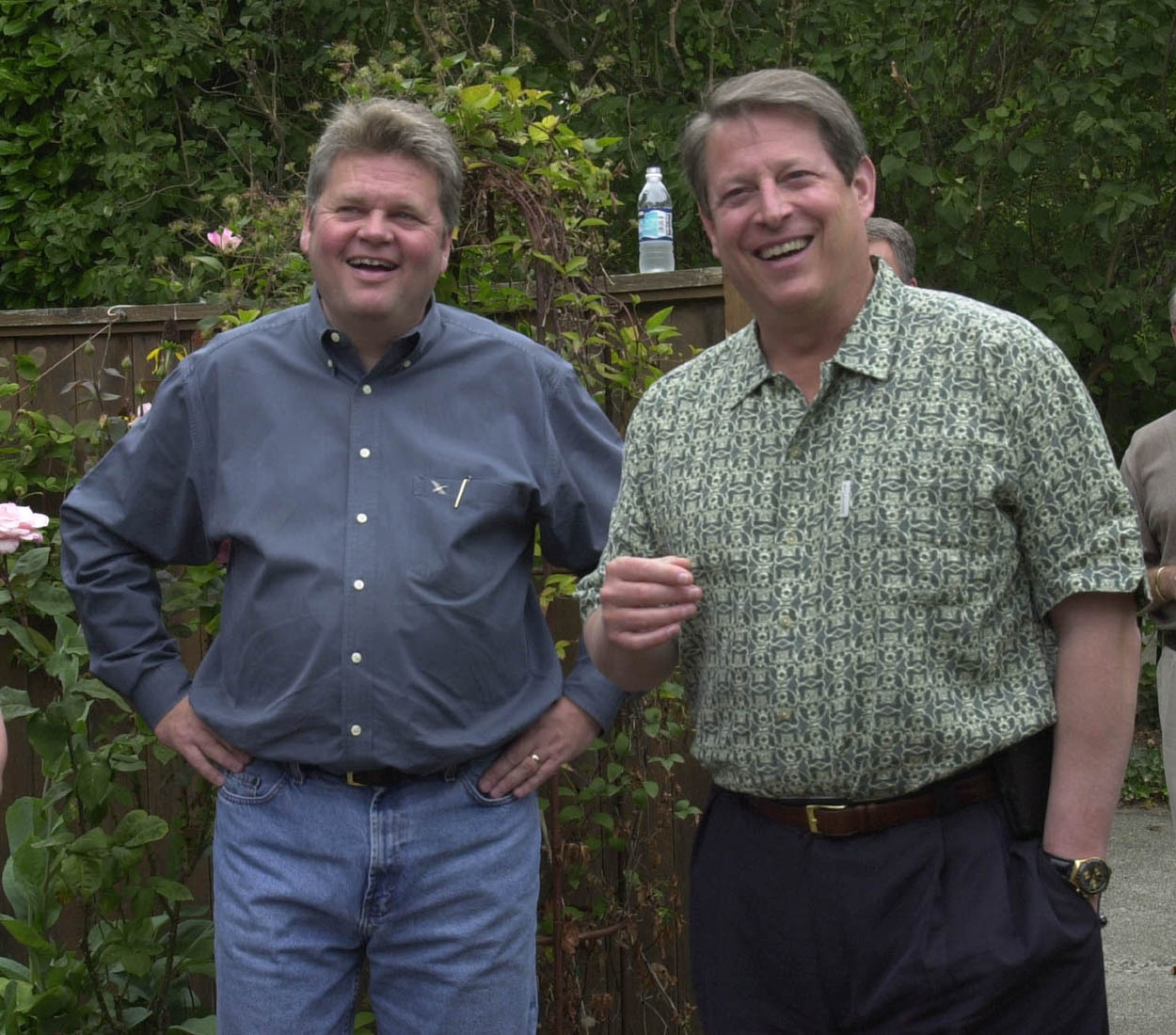
Mayor Nickels with former Vice President and environmentalist Al Gore

In 2005, Nickels announced an "Environmental Action Agenda" with the goal of protecting air quality and public health. The primary goal of the agenda is to reduce Seattle's greenhouse gas emissions "to meet or beat" the levels stipulated in the Kyoto protocols. Nickels spearheaded the US Mayors Climate Protection Agreement, an accord between over 600 US cities committed to reducing greenhouse emissions. Nickels won the 2006 Climate Protection Award from the Environmental Protection Agency, the 2006 Edgar Wayburn Award for Environmental leadership from the National Sierra Club, and the 2006 National Conservation Achievement Award from the National Wildlife Federation.

Political offices
Preceded by Paul Schell	Mayor of Seattle; 2002–2009	Succeeded by Mike McGinn
