= Richard Hugo =

American poet (1923–1982)

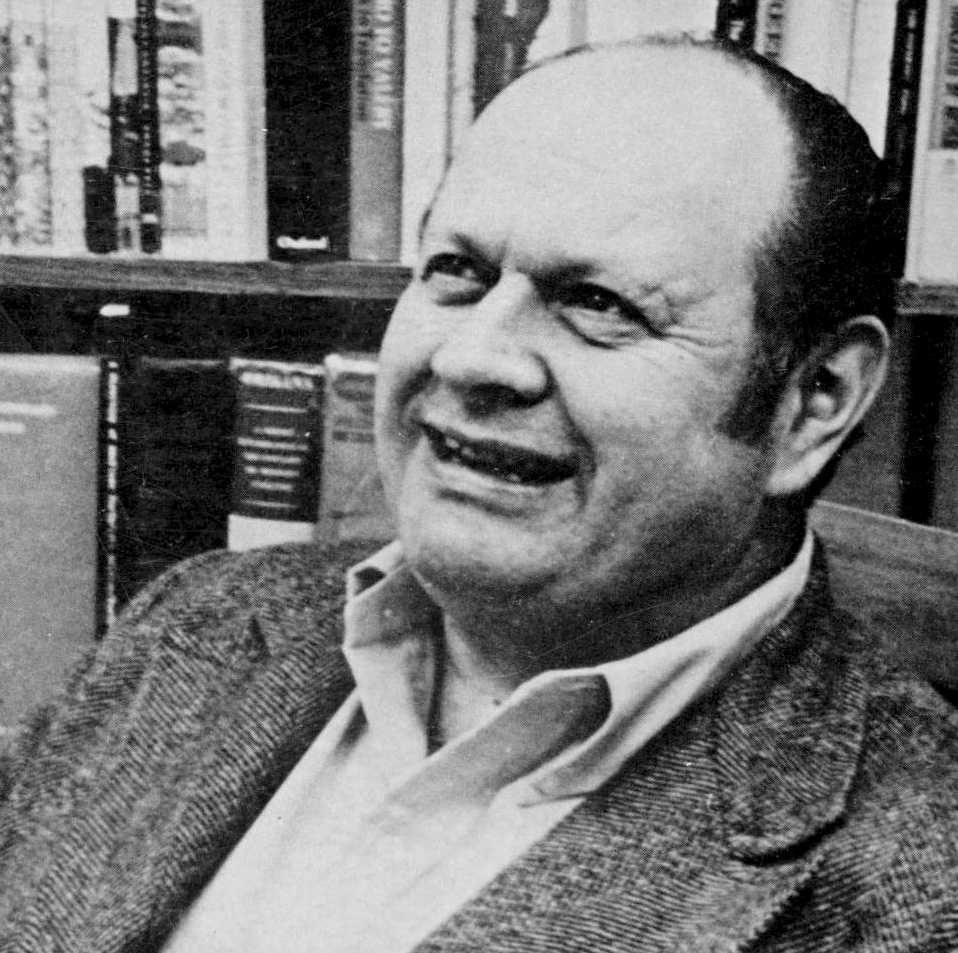
- Born: Richard Franklin Hogan; December 21, 1923; Seattle, Washington, U.S.
- Died: October 22, 1982 (aged 58); Seattle, Washington, U.S.
- Education: University of Washington (BA, MA)
- Occupations: Poet, professor
- Spouse: Ripley Schemm
- Children: 2

Richard Hugo (December 21, 1923 – October 22, 1982), born Richard Franklin Hogan, was an American poet. Although some critics regard Hugo as primarily a regionalist, his work resonates broadly across place and time. A portion of Hugo's work reflects the economic depression of the Northwestern United States, particularly Montana.

== Life and work ==
Born in the White Center area of Seattle, Washington on December 21, 1923, he was raised by his mother's parents after his father left the family. In 1942 he legally changed his name to Richard Hugo, taking his stepfather's surname. He served in World War II as a bombardier in the Mediterranean. He left the service in 1945 after flying 35 combat missions and reaching the rank of first lieutenant. Hugo's experiences in the military are referenced in one of his books of poetry, Good Luck in Cracked Italian. Hugo received his B.A. in 1948, and his M.A. in Creative Writing four years later, from the University of Washington where he studied under Theodore Roethke. He married Barbara Williams in 1952, the same year he started working as a technical writer for Boeing.

In 1961 his first book of poems, A Run of Jacks, was published. Soon after he took a creative writing teaching job at the University of Montana. He later became the head of the creative writing program there. His wife returned to Seattle in 1964; they divorced soon after. He published five more books of poetry, a memoir, a highly respected book on writing, and also a mystery novel. His posthumous book of collected poetry, Making Certain It Goes On, evinces that his poems are marked by crisp, gorgeous images of nature that often stand in contrast to his own depression, loneliness, and alcoholism. Although almost always written in free verse, his poems have a strong sense of rhythm that often echoes iambic meters. He also wrote a large number of informal epistolary poems at a time when that form was unfashionable.

Hugo's The Real West Marginal Way is a collection of essays, generally autobiographical in nature, that detail his childhood, his military service, his poetics, and his teaching.

Hugo remarried in 1974 to Ripley Schemm Hansen and became stepfather to Matthew and Melissa Hansen. In 1977, he was named the editor of the Yale Younger Poets Series.

Hugo died of leukemia in Seattle on October 22, 1982. Hugo House - a non-profit community writing center in Seattle - is named after him.

== Bibliography ==
- A Run of Jacks (1961)
- Death of the Kapowsin Tavern (1965)
- Good Luck in Cracked Italian (1969)
- The Lady in Kicking Horse Reservoir (1973)
- The Missoula Softball Tournament (1973)
- What Thou Lovest Well, Remains American (1975)
- Rain Five Days and I Love It (1976)
- 31 Letters and 13 Dreams (1977)
- The Triggering Town: Lectures and Essays on Poetry and Writing (1979)
- Selected Poems (1979)
- The Right Madness on Skye (1980)
- White Center (1980)
- Death and the Good Life (Mystery Novel) (1981)
- Sea Lanes Out (1983)
- Making Certain it Goes On: The Collected Poems of Richard Hugo (1984)
- The Real West Marginal Way: a Poet's Autobiography (1987)

== TV Show ==
His novel Death and the Good Life (1981) inspired the French TV show Alex Hugo, broadcast on the channel France 2 since March 19th 2014 and on France 3 since 21 September 2021.
