= Michael McGinn =

American politician (born 1959)

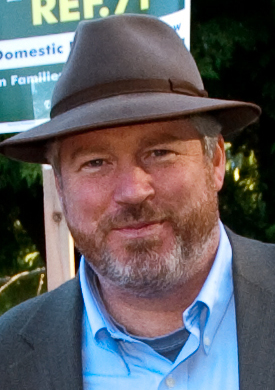
- McGinn in 2009

52nd Mayor of Seattle
- In office January 1, 2010 – January 1, 2014
- Deputy: Darryl Smith
- Preceded by: Greg Nickels
- Succeeded by: Ed Murray

Personal details
- Born: December 17, 1959 (age 66) Long Island, New York, U.S.
- Party: Democratic
- Children: 3
- Education: Williams College (BA); University of Washington (JD)
- Occupation: Attorney; activist; politician

Michael McGinn (born December 17, 1959) is an American lawyer and politician. He served as mayor of the city of Seattle, Washington, and is a neighborhood activist and a former State Chair of the Sierra Club.

In what was characterized as a "sea change in the power structure of Seattle", McGinn differentiated his campaign by his opposition to the proposed tunnel replacement to the Alaskan Way Viaduct. He was elected in November 2009 with the support of groups considered "political outsiders", such as environmentalists, biking advocates, musicians, advocates for the poor, nightclub owners, and younger voters.

== Early life and education ==
Originally from Long Island, New York, McGinn earned a B.A. in economics from Williams College and worked for Congressman Jim Weaver as a legislative aide. McGinn attended law school at the University of Washington School of Law. After graduating, he practiced business law for the Seattle firm Stokes Lawrence, becoming a partner. He left Stokes Lawrence in 2005 and started Great City Initiative, a nonprofit advocacy group.

In 2024, his son was prosecuted for possessing large quantities of explicit material involving children.

== Political activism ==
McGinn is credited with increasing the influence of the Sierra Club, helping transform it into a "real political force" in Seattle. According to McGinn, the club's political committee was "moribund" when he volunteered to lead it in the mid-1990s. The group grew to 50 active political leaders by 2009.

McGinn is the founder and former executive director of the Seattle Great City Initiative, a nonprofit advocacy group, and a former head of the Greenwood Community Council. At Great City, he oversaw a budget of $160,000 and worked alliances with companies like Triad Development, Harbor Properties and Paul Allen's Vulcan Inc. on environmental and urban development issues.

As a neighborhood organizer and head of his nonprofit, McGinn endorsed his future opponent Mayor Greg Nickels and worked with him to bar development of large, commercial "big box stores", eliminate street parking in favor of bus lanes and push for changes in zoning laws to encourage greater density in the Greenwood neighborhood. McGinn stepped down from his position as head of the Greenwood Community Council in 2006 and stepped down as executive director of his nonprofit in March 2009 to run for mayor.

In 2007, McGinn used his position as a leader in the Sierra Club's Cascade Chapter to help successfully campaign against metropolitan Seattle's Proposition 1, a combined road and mass transit measure, in favor of a transit-only measure. He later chaired the successful campaign to pass a Seattle parks levy.

McGinn's management record as an activist has come under scrutiny, including his chairmanship of Seattle's successful 2008 parks levy campaign. Brice Maryman, a leader in the parks campaign, said, "There wouldn't have been a parks levy on the ballot ... without Mike McGinn's leadership", but some Seattle City Council members, including Tom Rasmussen, said that McGinn mismanaged the effort. The City Council became "alarmed" at what members described as a disorganized effort. It appointed Seattle Parks Foundation Executive Director Karen Daubert as co-chair to help save the levy campaign. Rasmussen says that it was Daubert who "saved the day" for the levy. McGinn credited his grassroots style of campaigning for the victory.

== Seattle mayoral campaigns ==
=== 2009 ===
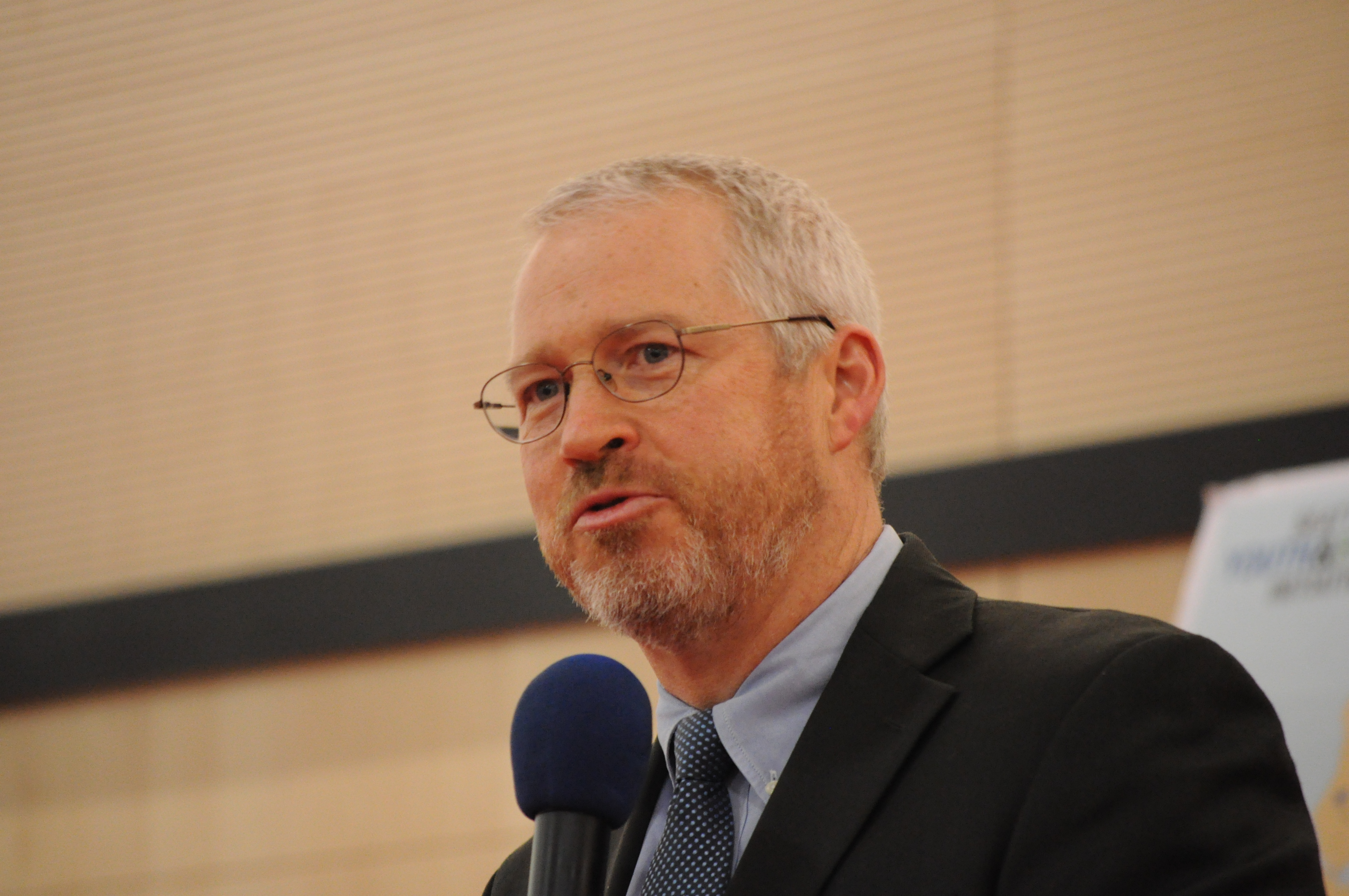
Mike McGinn at a townhall

McGinn announced his candidacy in the 2009 Seattle mayoral election on March 24, 2009. He said his principal policy positions would center on schools, broadband Internet access and local transportation infrastructure. He advocated replacement of the Alaskan Way Viaduct with a surface street instead of the planned tunnel; supplanting private broadband Internet service with a fiber optic system built and operated by Seattle City Light, the city's municipally owned electric utility; and greater local neighborhood control of parking taxes and meter rates. He also raised the possibility of abolishing the city's independent school board, with operation of the schools to become a city government responsibility.

Mayor Greg Nickels proposed eliminating Seattle's business tax on single-occupancy vehicle commuters on the grounds it was no longer needed and was hurting business and job growth. McGinn opposed ending the tax, called the Employee Hours Tax, which taxes business $25 for each of its employees who drives to work alone. McGinn said that Nickels and fellow candidate Joe Mallahan, who also favored repealing the tax, were "out of touch" and too close to the "business elite".

McGinn rode his electrically assisted bicycle to and from political events and maintained no paid campaign staff. In an upset, aided by exposure in the form of a cover profile from The Stranger, McGinn led the August primary with 39,097 votes, ahead of Mallahan's 37,933 and Nickels's 35,781. By October 2009, the McGinn campaign had raised about $150,000.

In the general election, T-Mobile executive Mallahan was perceived as the "insider candidate", endorsed by Governor Christine Gregoire, a supporter of the tunnel.

McGinn defeated Mallahan on November 3 in a close race, with 51.14% of the vote. Although the race was so close in the early vote count that a recount was considered a possibility, the gap between the candidates widened as the tally proceeded. Mallahan conceded on November 9, saying of McGinn that "he seemed to be the superior campaigner this time around" and that McGinn's message "seemed to resonate" with Seattle's voters. Describing the coalition that backed McGinn, University of Washington political science professor David Olson said, "these new actors are legitimate, numerically important and politically very skilled".

Mallahan criticized McGinn for "push polling" with robocalls to Seattle residents during the campaign. Mallahan called one survey about the proposed Alaskan Way Viaduct "dishonest" but McGinn says the poll was legitimate research. Nickels had used "negative" robocalls himself against McGinn a few months earlier in the primary campaign.

=== 2013 ===
In 2013, McGinn ran for reelection. He placed second in a field of nine candidates in the Seattle mayoral primary, and lost the general election with 47% of the vote to Ed Murray's 52%.

=== 2017 ===
On April 17, 2017, McGinn announced his candidacy in the 2017 mayoral election, looking to unseat Murray. He did not advance to the runoff, placing sixth with 6.5% of the first-round vote.

== Policy positions ==
=== Taxes and budget ===
In 2010, McGinn asked for a higher car tab tax and a mandatory doubling of the parking lot tax, a $241 million levy to replace the city's seawall two years early and almost doubling the city's education levy to $231 million. McGinn's budget included a mandatory, city directed increase in parking fees in several neighborhoods to $4 an hour, increases which were expected to return an estimated $20 million in revenue for the city. He allocated a $13 million funding increase for bicycle and pedestrian projects derived from new taxes on motorists. At the same time, he sought reduced funding in road maintenance and widespread cuts in basics such as police and library services. His increased funding of pedestrian and bicycle projects during a time of general cuts raised criticism of his budgetary priorities. In all McGinn's budget slashed $67 million from various areas by laying off 300 employees, reducing hours at community centers, cutting park maintenance, raising fees, and reducing the wages of union workers.

For 2012, McGinn proposed deferring some maintenance on roads and buildings and across the board cuts into the 2012 fiscal year, alerting police, fire and human-services departments to prepare for three to six percent cuts and all other departments for four to eight percent cuts, in order to close a $17 million funding gap. In other areas McGinn proposed funding increases.

Responding to a letter from Seattle Gay News, and at the recommendation of the city government's Seattle Lesbian Gay Bisexual Transgender Commission, McGinn said he would "work to improve" city health benefits packages up for renewal in 2013 so that the city would be able to pay for transgender employees' mental health care, steroid treatments and gender-affirming surgery. Citing opinions by the American Medical Association and the American Psychological Association, the Commission called the treatments "a medical necessity" and McGinn responded that the issue is more about fairness than costs.

McGinn also created a new position at city hall for a former Cascade Bicycle Club lobbyist at $95,000 a year after giving a $21,000 raise to his new communications director, bringing that yearly salary to $120,000. The creation of the new position generated controversy as it coincided with across the board budget cuts for other departments.

=== Education ===
After winning the election, McGinn forwarded an expanded education levy that would raise $115 million in additional taxes for the Seattle Public School District. He asserted that doubling the levy was necessary to get additional money to programs serving low-income and minority families. The levy would also expand early education and kindergartens, extra elementary school programs for high-poverty areas, support for struggling students transitioning from middle to high school, and academic, career, and college planning for at-risk high school students. The Seattle Times called the size of the tax hike "tone deaf" to the economic realities of voters. Acknowledging the size of the levy as a concern, the Seattle City Council still voted unanimously to forward the levy proposal to voters with Tim Burgess, the Council's lead on the levy, saying its size "matched the needs" of Seattle's children. The levy was approved by voters in the 2011 general election.

McGinn and the school district launched a program to improve school attendance in Seattle Public Schools called "Be There Get Here" in 2011. The idea behind the program is to improve academic performance by improving attendance, based on data showing that students with fewer absences graduate at a notably higher rate. Incentives are offered to students, such as entering them in a raffle if they keep absences to less than five. Six months into the program, absences were reduced by 50%, the lowest rate in five years.

=== Marijuana ===
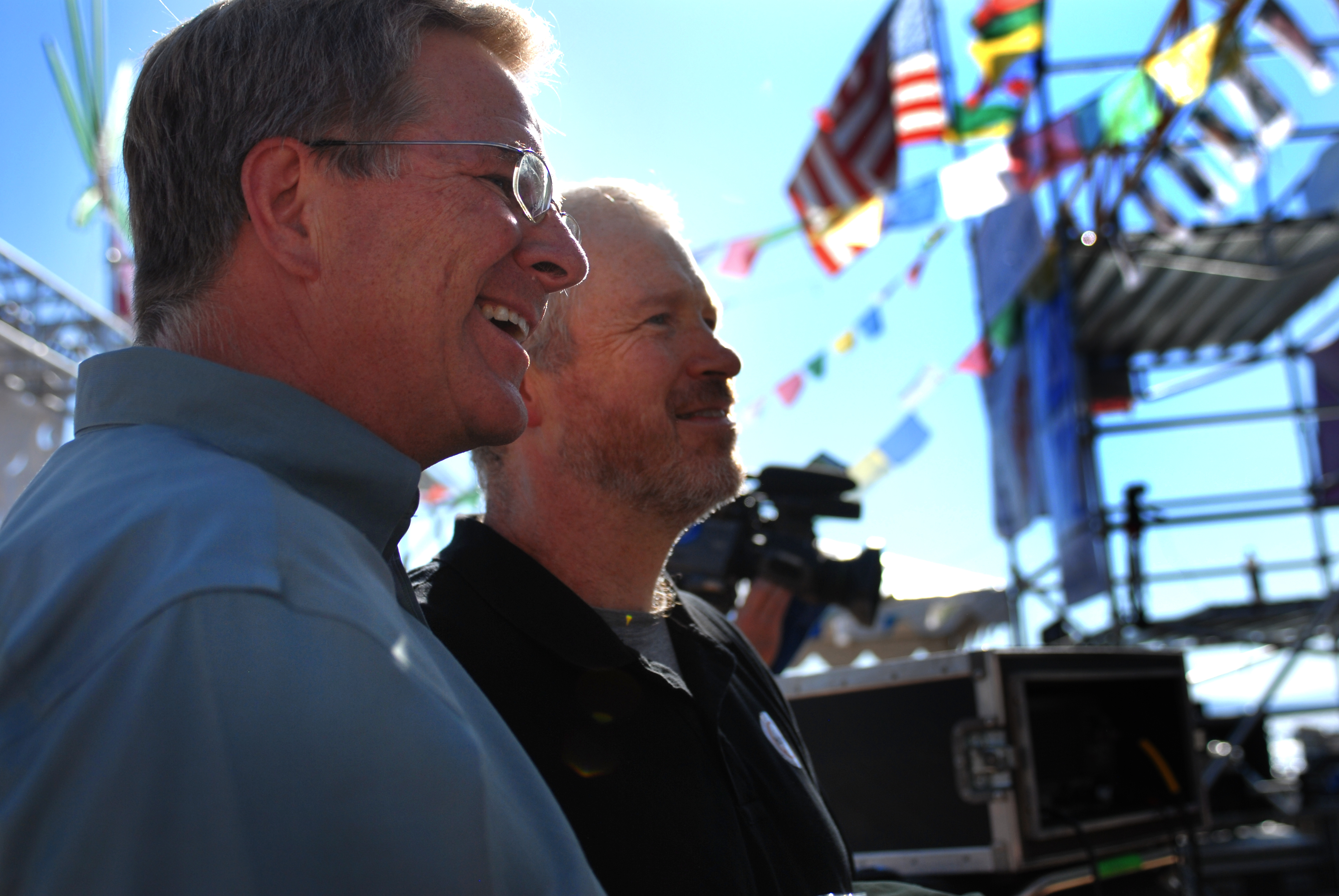
McGinn and author Rick Steves at Seattle Hempfest in 2011

McGinn supports the legalization and taxation of marijuana, saying on KUOW-FM, "We recognize that, you know, like alcohol, it's something that should be regulated, not treated as a criminal activity. And I think that's where the citizens of Seattle want us to go." He believes marijuana can be used as a cash crop to offset the city's financial problems. McGinn called for an executive review of Seattle's law enforcement policy in regard to marijuana after a police raid on a medical marijuana user who was growing plants in his home. He has said that he believes the country is in a time of transition in regard to marijuana policy, citing California as a "social bellwether".

In July 2011, McGinn signed a Seattle-specific medical marijuana bill similar to one vetoed by former governor Christine Gregoire. The bill allows the licensing of marijuana dispensaries within Seattle.

=== Transportation ===
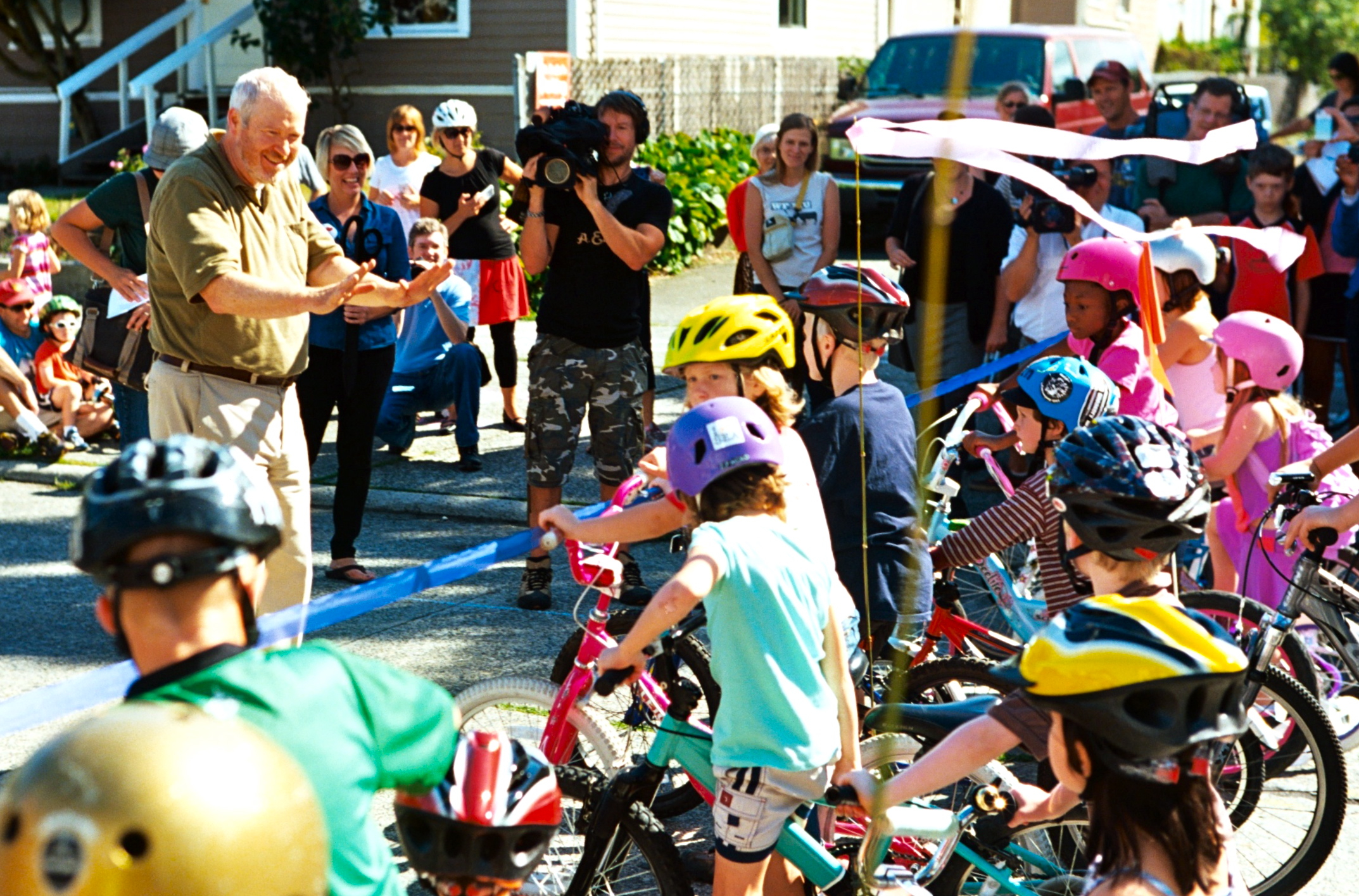
McGinn at the ribbon cutting for the Ballard Neighborhood Greenway, a bicycle boulevard.

McGinn is a proponent of reducing car ridership and increasing bicycling, walking, and public transportation. He proposed raising taxes on car transportation. He has been described in a critical editorial as "philosophically anti-car". McGinn described the idea of a war on cars as "silly" and stated his transportation policy is focused on reducing the number of cars in Seattle and expanding biking, walking and public transit. From his time as a neighborhood activist in Greenwood to his mayoralty, McGinn pushed for the removal of car lanes and on-street parking around the city in favor of bus and bike lanes. He also supports the reduction of lanes dedicated to vehicular traffic within the city through "road diets". These programs convert four lanes of traffic into two lanes, using the added space from lane reductions for the inclusion of bike lanes and a center turn lane. Some of these programs have been well received as improving safety for bicyclists and lowering vehicle speeds while others have been opposed as hurting local business and inappropriate for arterial routes.

McGinn opposed the planned replacement of the Evergreen Point Floating Bridge that connects Seattle to Bellevue and Redmond. He tried to stop the plan, which calls for six lanes instead of four, citing his opposition to building new roads. McGinn opposed adding any traffic capacity and stated his desire to see the additional capacity instead used as transit-only lanes. He also supported tolling on the bridge in order to further diminish car usage.

McGinn advocates expanding light rail in Seattle calling for a public vote in 2011 to raise taxes for a new light rail line for the western side of the city, including Ballard, Interbay, Queen Anne, Belltown, Downtown, West Seattle, and possibly Fremont.

==== Proposed tunnel ====
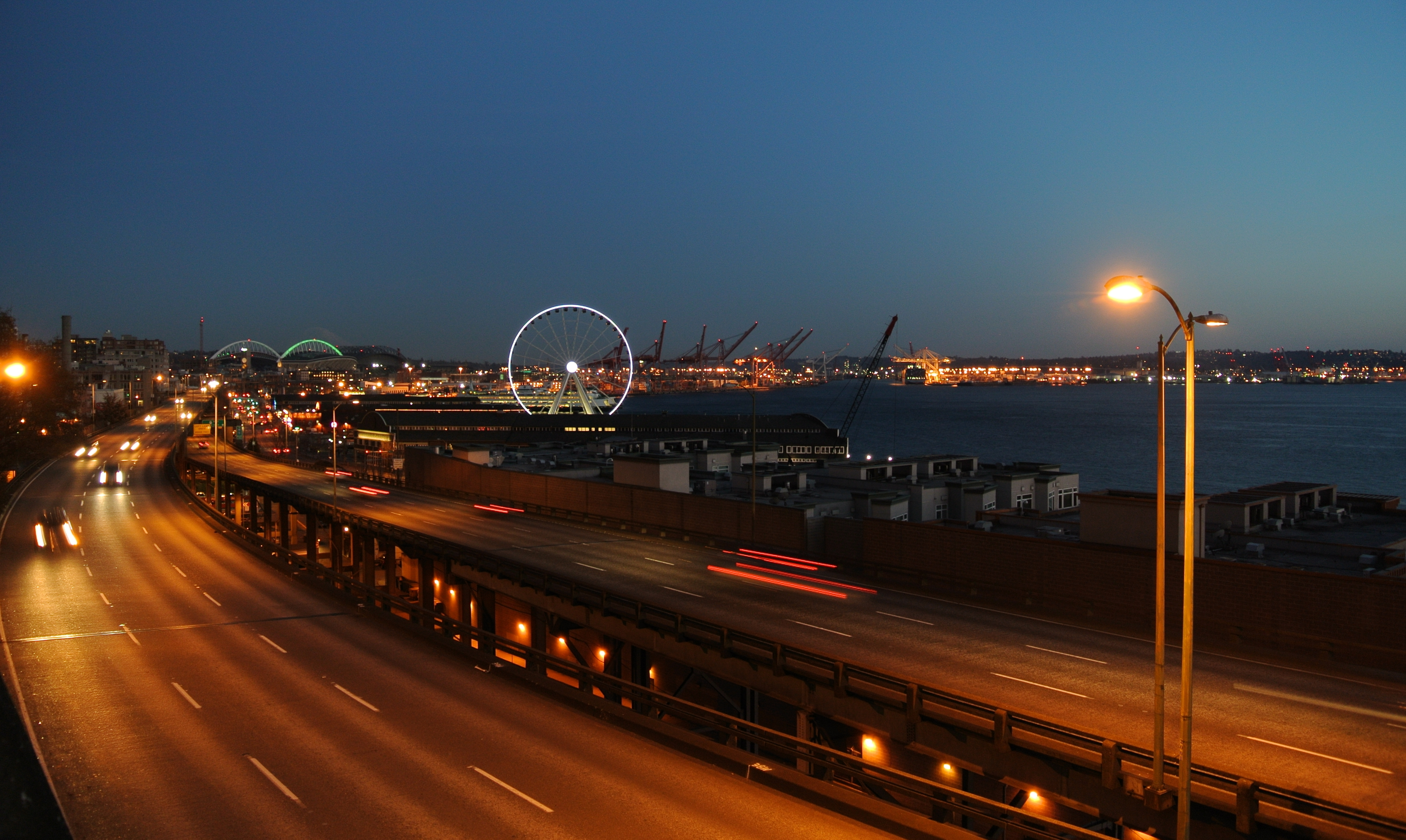
Alaskan Way Viaduct

During his campaign for mayor, McGinn said that the deep bore tunnel replacement of the Alaskan Way Viaduct was "a huge waste of money that's completely indefensible." His opposition to the tunnel was criticized by groups like the Greater Seattle Chamber of Commerce, the downtown business community, the King County Labor Council and the Seattle Times, which, in an editorial critical of both candidates, called McGinn's surface street plan "impractical" and claimed it would clog downtown and overwhelm nearby Interstate 5. Down in the polls during the final days of the campaign, McGinn, while reiterating his opposition to the tunnel, promised that as mayor he would honor the then-recent unanimous City Council vote to move forward with the project.

After the election, state employee emails revealed a discomfort with the McGinn campaign by state government and transportation officials over McGinn's opposition to the tunnel. Ron Judd, an aide to Governor Gregoire, sent emails to staff and DOT officials saying McGinn's position was "BS" and accusing him of stoking populist anger and relying on voter's ignorance about funding details to advance opposition to the tunnel. Washington State Transportation Secretary Paula Hammond described McGinn's budget forecasting as "wild accusations" as she monitored a campaign debate on her Blackberry, and in response to questions raising concerns about her involvement in opposing the McGinn campaign said, "I can't stand it when politicians make things up in order to win an election. When people do that, I think it's our responsibility to clear the record. That's my motivation." State officials were criticized for supporting Mallahan and opposing McGinn, and for releasing a video of a 2007 computer animation showing collapse of the Alaskan Way Viaduct in a hypothetical earthquake just nine days before the election.

After taking office McGinn repeatedly made efforts to stop construction of the tunnel. Citing potential cost overruns, he proposed a surface street replacement of the viaduct and the reduction of cars on that portion of the Washington State Route 99 corridor from 105,000 to 50,000 per weekday. He said the lost traffic capacity could be offset by diverting more cars to Interstate 5, increased transit use, walking, biking and drivers staying home.

In The Stranger in June 2010, during negotiations on a master contract with the state, McGinn wrote, "Ninety percent of megaprojects have cost overruns... Seattle has to pay overruns, but has no say over the project...[b]ecause the tunnel is a state-controlled project, and the state maintains all decision-making authority over it... Cost overruns could lead to severe cuts to basic services."

In February 2011, when the Seattle City Council voted 8-1 to sign an agreement allowing the tunnel project to proceed, McGinn vetoed the ordinance. The City Council then overrode his veto, again 8-1. After the March 2011 Tōhoku earthquake in Japan, McGinn, citing the quake, called for the viaduct to be pulled down a year early. No plan to replace or mitigate the lost traffic capacity was put forward. The call was opposed by some businesses and transportation experts. The president of Ballard's North Seattle Industrial Association called the likely fallout of early closure "a horror show", citing the corridor's role as the primary arterial for workers, equipment and supplies between manufacturers along Seattle's two key manufacturing zones, the Duwamish Waterway and along the Lake Washington Ship Canal. Washington's State's Department of Transportation viaduct program administrator also opposed the idea, saying, "To simply close the viaduct without a reasonable replacement in place would be very damaging to the city of Seattle economically. To start over now and pursue a new alternative would delay the overall project schedule. The viaduct is just as vulnerable as it was before the earthquake in Japan."

After having his veto on the tunnel overridden, McGinn called for a referendum on the tunnel. Two of his staff members took temporary leaves of absence to work on the anti-tunnel campaign and McGinn and his wife both donated money; Councilmember Sally Clark's aide took a leave of absence to run the pro-tunnel campaign. He called for others to support the measure and donate money. After the campaign turned in 29,000 signatures, Washington State Transportation Secretary Paula Hammond said that delays and court costs associated with the referendum would cost the city $54 million and Ron Paananen, the Alaskan Way Viaduct replacement project administrator, said should it succeed it would cost the city over $1 billion. Fellow tunnel opponent City Councilman Mike O'Brien said that, when looked at a different way, cancelling the tunnel would save the city $700 million. The resulting referendum, on which a yes-vote was effectively pro-tunnel, was approved by about 60% of Seattle voters.

=== Social welfare and public safety ===
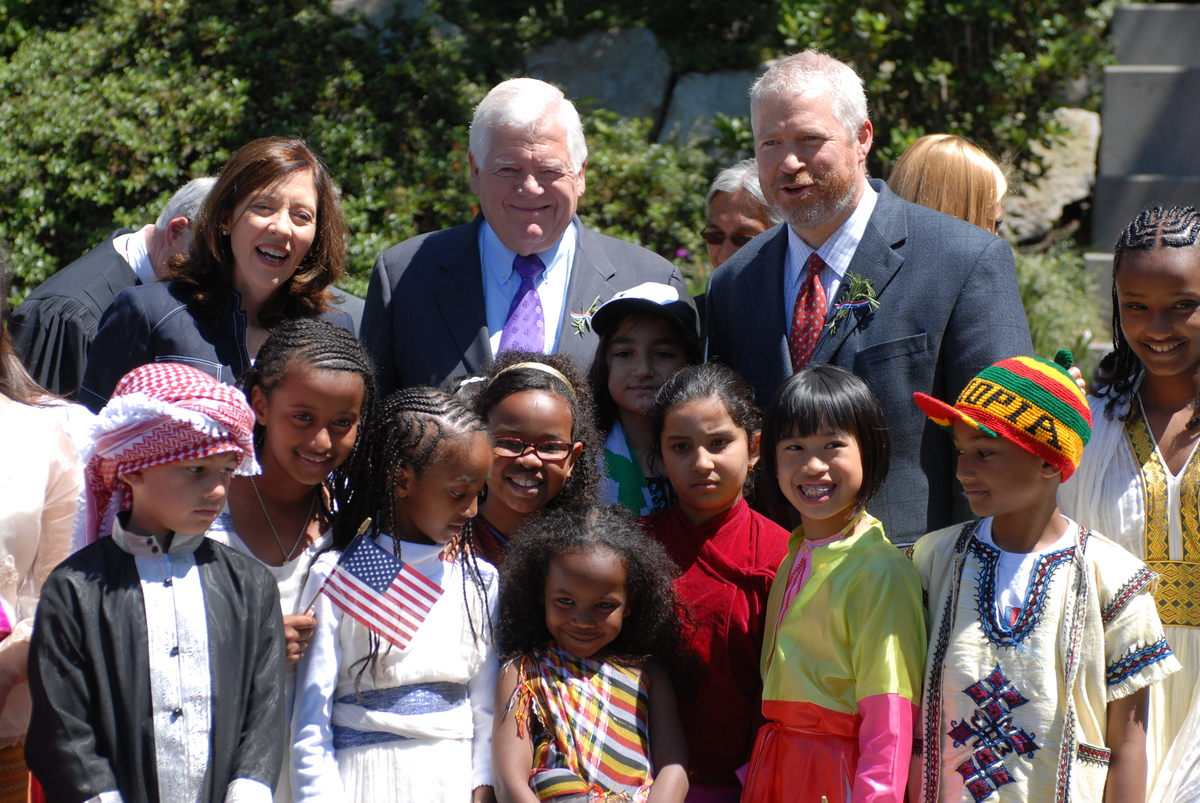
McGinn at a 4th of July ceremony with Representative Jim McDermott and U.S. Senator Maria Cantwell

As both a candidate and a mayor, McGinn supported his predecessor's attempts to ban all guns from parks and other public places. After the King County Superior Court overturned the gun ban for violating state law, McGinn petitioned the state legislature to change the law.

After a series of controversial police actions, McGinn laid out in his State of the City address that there was "no place" for police officers in Seattle who did not share city officials' commitment to racial and social justice. News reports said that a Seattle Police Officer's Guild spokesperson thought "it's scary that the mayor is trying to influence how officers perceive things". Later, in the aftermath of the shooting of transient woodcarver John T. Williams by a Seattle police officer, McGinn declared February 27 "John T. Williams Day." The declaration was met with a variety of reactions from activists, the media and community groups. Some media figures and police officers complained that honoring a man with a long criminal record who had been recorded threatening the lives of police officers was inappropriate and others claimed the declaration was political pandering designed to distract from perceived failures in his leadership. Conversely, many members of the community and the Williams family expressed gratitude and John Diaz, Seattle Chief of Police, declared the invitation to the event "an honor."

In his first two years as mayor, McGinn spearheaded a new program in the Seattle Police Department to expand foot patrols around entertainment venues and nightlife hot spots during the summer, predominantly in the Belltown neighborhood. The program came in response to several early-morning shootings outside bars and nightclubs. The emphasis of the program is to preempt crime in the area on evenings and weekends. Additional neighborhoods targeted for increased patrols were Alki beach and the Greek Row around the University of Washington.

McGinn and an advisory panel of advocates for the homeless that he appointed called for the creation of a "long-term" housing facility for the homeless on city land. The panel forwarded seven different locations for the mayor's consideration. After initially choosing a site in the Georgetown neighborhood, McGinn elected to have the old Fire Station 39 in Lake City act as the site for a period of four to six months. In March 2011, the City Council rejected McGinn's plan for the permanent facility in Georgetown, citing the mayor's failure to secure the environmental review required by state law in order to make the necessary zoning changes. McGinn's criticized the Council and tried to draw a parallel to the Council's decision on the Alaskan Way Viaduct Tunnel project, saying, "They approved agreements with the state [for the tunnel] even though the environmental review is far from complete". The homeless facility was expected to cost approximately a half million dollars a year.

McGinn vetoed a ban on aggressive panhandling that was passed by a 5–4 vote of the Seattle city council. Supporters said the law was designed to cut down on aggressive panhandlers using intimidating language and gestures, begging at ATMs, repeatedly soliciting people who have already said no or blocking people's path while soliciting money. He cited concerns about free speech rights, the panhandlers not having access to lawyers, and that the bill could compel people into mental health and drug treatment programs instead of what he called the "normal civil commitment process." In a "stunning display" of the clout of McGinn and his political allies to stop a measure that was widely expected to be implemented, the city council failed to override his veto of the panhandling law.

== Relations with organized labor ==
In his campaign for mayor, McGinn received the endorsements of several unions, including IBEW Local 77, SEIU Local 925, and UFCW Local 21. The King County Labor Council endorsed Mallahan, mainly because of McGinn's opposition to the tunnel to replace the viaduct, described by unions as a "deal breaker" that would cause the city and its unions to lose jobs and billions of dollars from the State of Washington and the federal government. The tunnel would have been partially funded by city, state, and federal governments, bringing federal money into the state and supporting the building industry. Seattle Firefighters Union Local 27 and the Seattle Police Officers Guild (SPOG) also endorsed Mallahan. SPOG President Rich O'Neill went on record at a news conference to criticize McGinn's lack of an adequate policy position regarding public safety.

McGinn's prescriptions in 2010 for the city budget shortfall included additional furloughing of city employees, and were opposed by local public employee unions.

== Public approval ==
In February 2010, two months after his election, McGinn's job approval was polled by SurveyUSA at 40% approve, 34% disapprove, and 27% unsure. By July, in a KING 5 poll, his approval was 45%, disapproving 38%, and 17% unsure. In March 2011, a poll by Elway Research reported public opinion of his performance as 4% excellent, 28% good, 39% fair, 27% poor, and 6% no opinion. A poll published by EMC Research in June 2011 showed a job approval rating of 33% and a disapproval rating of 65% in March. The same poll conducted in June showed a job approval of 23% and a disapproval of 73%. A SurveyUSA poll released on February 21, 2012, showed 33% approve, 50% disapprove, and 18% unsure.

== Post-mayoral career ==
As of 2025, he is the Executive Director of America Walks, a nonprofit promoting walkable neighborhoods.

Political offices
Preceded by Greg Nickels	Mayor of Seattle; 2010–2013	Succeeded by Ed Murray
