= College Success Foundation =

US nonprofit organization

- Formation: 2000
- Founder: Bob Craves; Ann Ramsay-Jenkins
- Type: Nonprofit
- Headquarters: Bellevue, Washington
- Key people: Mike Cheever (president and CEO)

College Success Foundation is an educational nonprofit headquartered in Bellevue, Washington, serving school districts in Washington state and the District of Columbia. The organization serves underrepresented students, first-generation college students, students of color, low-income students and foster youth.

== History ==
The foundation was formed in 2000 as the Washington Education Foundation by two former members of the state's Higher Education Coordinating Board, Bob Craves and Ann Ramsay-Jenkins, under the terms of the Washington State 2020 Commission on the Future of Post-Secondary Education created by Gov. Gary Locke. Initial funding for the foundation came from the Gates Foundation.

In 2006, College Success Foundation-District of Columbia (CSF-DC) was founded as a subsidiary focusing on the District of Columbia, particularly in Wards 7 and 8. In 2007, the organization changed its name and began to include college prep and support services for students beginning in middle school.

== Public School Districts ==
CSF advisors work directly in schools with high percentages of low-income students. CSF collaborates with school districts to improve high school graduation rates and increase the number of graduates going directly to college.

Public school districts that the foundation works with include:

- Washington state public school districts: Highline, Spokane, Tacoma, Yakima
- District of Columbia public and charter school district: Ward 7, Ward 8
