= List of Silver Anniversary Awards recipients =

This is a list of the recipients of the Silver Anniversary Awards by the year of award.

The Silver Anniversary Awards are awarded every year by the American National Collegiate Athletic Association (NCAA) to recognize six distinguished former student-athletes on their 25th anniversary as college graduates. The Silver Anniversary Awards were first given in 1973, when five distinguished former student-athletes were honored. Since 1986, the number of annual honorees has increased to six.

In order to be eligible, the nominee must be a college graduate, must have competed in intercollegiate competition 25 years before the NCAA convention date, must be a varsity letter winner at an NCAA member institution and, must have achieved personal distinction since their graduation. One-third of the selection criteria is based on the nominee's achievements during their time as a prominent collegiate athlete, while the other two-thirds are determined by the nominee's career achievements, including professional, charitable and civic contributions.

== Class of 1973 ==
- Ray Evans, Kansas (football/basketball)
- John Ferraro, USC (football)
- John Hopper, Dickinson (basketball/baseball/golf)
- Donals Mulder, Hope (basketball/baseball)
- Stewart Udall, Arizona (basketball)

See: All-Time Honors Award Winners

== Class of 1974 ==
- Howard Callaway, Georgia Tech (squash/tennis/boxing)
- Robert Dorsey, Ohio State (football)
- Robert McCurry, Michigan State (football)
- Robert Robinson, Baylor (basketball)
- Eugene Rossides, Columbia (football)

See: All-Time Honors Award Winners

== Class of 1975 ==
- Robert Folsom, Southern Methodist University (football/basketball/baseball /track)
- Billy Jones, Vanderbilt University (football/basketball/track)
- William Keating, University of Cincinnati (swimming)
- Ralph O'Brien, Butler University (basketball)
- Phillip Ryan, U.S. Naval Academy (football/lacrosse/ basketball)

See: All-Time Honors Award Winners

== Class of 1976 ==
- Napoleon Bell, Mount Union College (football/track)
- Ernest Curtis, Vanderbilt University (football/basketball)
- Samuel Greenawalt, University of Pennsylvania (football/squash)
- Ross Pritchard, University of Arkansas (football/track)
- Wade Stinson, University of Kansas (football)

See: All-Time Honors Award Winners

== Class of 1977 ==
- Don Coleman, Michigan State University (football)
- Dick Kazmaier, Princeton University (football)
- George Rhoden, Morgan State University (athletics)
- William Wade, Vanderbilt University (football)
- Frederick A. Yonkman, Hope College (football)

See: All-Time Honors Award Winners

== Class of 1978 ==
- Thane Baker, Kansas State University (track)
- Andrew Kozar, University of Tennessee (football)
- Donn Moomaw, University of California, Los Angeles (football)
- Lowell Perry, University of Michigan (football)
- Cecil Silas, Georgia Institute of Technology (basketball)

See: All-Time Honors Award Winners

== Class of 1979 ==
- Charles Barcelona, University of Toledo (football)
- Paul Ebert, Ohio State University (basketball/baseball)
- Robert Pettit, Louisiana State University (basketball)
- Hamilton Richardson, Tulane University (tennis)
- Richard Rosenthal, University of Notre Dame (basketball)

See: All-Time Honors Award Winners

== Class of 1980 ==
- Alan Ameche, University of Wisconsin (football)
- Richard Boushka, Saint Louis University (basketball)
- Thomas Gola, LaSalle University (basketball)
- Larry Morris, Georgia Tech (football)
- John Twyman, University of Cincinnati (basketball)

See: All-Time Honors Award Winners

== Class of 1981 ==
- Bruce Bosley, West Virginia University (football)
- Bobby Freeman, Louisiana State University (boxing)
- Fob James, Auburn University (football)
- Willie Naulls, University of California, Los Angeles (basketball)
- Ronnie Shavlik, North Carolina State University (basketball)

See: All-Time Honors Award Winners

== Class of 1982 ==
- James Brown, Syracuse University (football)
- Willie Davis, Grambling State University (football)
- Jack Kemp, Occidental College (football)
- Ronald Kramer, University of Michigan (football/basketball/track)
- Jim Swink, Texas Christian University (football)

See: All-Time Honors Award Winners

== Class of 1983 ==
- Michael Armacost, Carleton College (football/basketball/baseball)
- Richard Censits, University of Pennsylvania (basketball)
- Ronald Delany, Villanova University (track)
- Aubrey Lewis, University of Notre Dame (football/track)
- Jack Lousma, University of Michigan (football)

See: All-Time Honors Award Winners

== Class of 1984 ==
- Robert Beckel, U.S. Air Force Academy (baseball/basketball)
- Peter Dawkins, U.S. Military Academy (football/hockey)
- Stephen Friedman, Cornell University (wrestling)
- Allen Geiberger, University of Southern California (golf)
- Peter Ueberroth, San Jose State University (swimming/water polo)

See: All-Time Honors Award Winners

== Class of 1985 ==
- Ralph Boston, Tennessee State University (track)
- William Carpenter, U.S. Military Academy (football)
- Paul Choquette, Brown University (football/track)
- Abner Haynes, University of North Texas (football)
- Oscar Robertson, University of Cincinnati (basketball)

See: All-Time Honors Award Winners

== Class of 1986 ==
- Robert Lilly, Texas Christian University (football)
- Frank McKinney, Indiana University (swimming)
- Claude Moorman, Duke University (football)
- Jack Nicklaus, Ohio State University (golf)
- Kenneth Shaw, Illinois State University (basketball)
- Francis Tarkenton, University of Georgia (football)

See: All-Time Honors Award Winners

== Class of 1987 ==
- Lamar Alexander, Vanderbilt (track)
- William Cohen, Bowdoin (basketball)
- Alexander Kroll, Rutgers (football)
- Merlin Olsen, Utah State (football)
- Joseph Romig, Colorado, (football)
- Wilma Rudolph, Tennessee State (track)

See: All-Time Honors Award Winners

== Class of 1988 ==
- John Baker, Mississippi State (football)
- Terry Baker, Oregon State (football/basketball)
- Raymond Flynn, Providence (basketball)
- Jesse Jackson, NC A&T (football)
- Lee Roy Jordan, Alabama (football)
- Hugh Richter, Wisconsin (football/basketball/baseball)

See: All-Time Honors Award Winners

== Class of 1989 ==
- Edward Bradley, Cheyney (football/track)
- Melvin Counts, Oregon State (basketball)
- Tony Hall, Denison (football)
- Paul Martha, Pittsburgh (football)
- Kirk Pendleton, Lehigh (wrestling)
- James Wilkinson, Duke (football)

See: All-Time Honors Award Winners

== Class of 1990 ==
- Donald E. Baxter, Mercer (basketball)
- Paul Bucha, Army (swimming/water polo)
- Dick Butkus, Illinois (football)
- Brig Owens, Cincinnati (football)
- Archie Roberts, Columbia (football/basketball/baseball)
- Roger Staubach, Navy (football/basketball/baseball)

See: All-Time Honors Award Winners

== Class of 1991 ==
- Dave Bing, Syracuse (basketball)
- Edith McGuire, Tennessee State (track)
- Mike Garrett, USC (football/baseball)
- Tone N. Grant, Yale (football/lacrosse)
- Steve Juday, Michigan State (football/baseball)
- James C. Lewis, Navy (lacrosse/soccer)

See: All-Time Honors Award Winners

== Class of 1992 ==
- Mal Graham, New York University (basketball)
- Bob Griese, Purdue University (football)
- Floyd Little, Syracuse University (football)
- Jim Lynch, University of Notre Dame (football)
- Alan Page, University of Notre Dame (football)
- Ricardo M. Urbina, Georgetown University (cross country/track)

See: All-Time Honors Award Winners

== Class of 1993 ==
- Dick Anderson, Colorado (football)
- Bob Johnson, Tennessee (football)
- Donna Lopiano, Southern Connecticut State University
- Don Schollander, Yale (swimming)
- Stan Smith, USC (tennis)
- Wyomia Tyus, Tennessee State (track/field)

See: All-Time Honors Award Winners

== Class of 1994 ==
- Kareem Abdul-Jabbar, UCLA (basketball)
- Lee Evans, San Jose (track/field)
- Calvin Hill, Yale (football)
- William C. Hurd, Notre Dame (track/field)
- Leroy Keyes, Purdue (football)
- Jim Ryun, Kansas (track)

See: All-Time Honors Award Winners

== Class of 1995 ==
- Lesley Bush, Indiana (diving)
- Larry Echo Hawk, BYU (football)
- Kwaku Ohene-Frempong, Yale (soccer/track/field)
- Bob Lanier, St. Bonaventure (basketball)
- Mike Phipps, Purdue (football)
- Mike Reid, Penn St. (football)

See: All-Time Honors Award Winners

== Class of 1996 ==
- Marty Liquori, Villanova University (cross country/track)
- Tommy Lyons, University of Georgia (football)
- Cliff Meely, University of Colorado at Boulder (basketball)
- Kurt Schmoke, Yale University (football/lacrosse)
- Joe Theismann, University of Notre Dame (football)
- Jack Youngblood, University of Florida (football)

See: All-Time Honors Award Winners

== Class of 1997 ==
- Tommy Casanova, Louisiana State University (football)
- Jack Ford, Yale University (football)
- David Joyner, Pennsylvania State University (football/wrestling)
- Edward B. Rust, Jr., Illinois Wesleyan University (football/wrestling)
- Jim Tedisco, Union College (basketball)
- Herb Washington, Michigan State University (track)

See: All-Time Honors Award Winners

== Class of 1998 ==
- Gary Hall, Sr., Indiana (swimming)
- Lawrie Mifflin, Yale (field hockey)
- Drew Pearson, Tulsa (football)
- Cynthia Potter, Indiana (diving)
- Sally Ride, Stanford (tennis)
- Harry Smith, Central College (football)

See: All-Time Honors Award Winners

== Class of 1999 ==
- Dave Casper, Notre Dame (football)
- Anita DeFrantz, Connecticut College (rowing)
- Pat Summitt, University of Tennessee at Martin (basketball)
- Lynn Swann, USC (football)
- Robert R. Thomas, Notre Dame (football)
- Bill Walton, UCLA (basketball)

See: All-Time Honors Award Winners

== Class of 2000 ==
- Dianne Baker, Texas Woman's University (softball/tennis/badminton/field hockey/soccer)
- Junior Bridgeman, Louisville
- Pat Haden, USC (football)
- Lisa Rosenblum, Yale (tennis)
- John Dickson Stufflebeem, Navy (football)
- John Trembley, Tennessee (swimming)

See: All-Time Honors Award Winners

== Class of 2001 ==
- Alpha V. Alexander, Wooster (basketball/volleyball/tennis/lacrosse)
- Archie Griffin, Ohio State (football)
- Steve Largent, Tulsa (football)
- Steve Raible, Georgia Tech (football/track)
- Lee Roy Selmon, Oklahoma (football)
- Wally Walker, Virginia (basketball)

See: All-Time Honors Award Winners

== Class of 2002 ==
- Richard C. Chapman, Augustana College (basketball)
- Bo Ellis, Marquette University (basketball)
- Herman Frazier, Arizona State University (track and field)
- Betsy King, Furman University (golf/basketball/field hockey)
- John Naber, University of Southern California (swimming)
- Rodney E. Slater, Eastern Michigan University (football)

See: All-Time Honors Award Winners

== Class of 2003 ==
- Debbie Brown, University of Southern California (volleyball)
- Ann Meyers, University of California, Los Angeles (basketball/volleyball/track and field)
- Dale Kramer, Carleton College (cross country/track and field)
- Ken MacAfee, University of Notre Dame (football)
- Warren Moon, University of Washington (football)
- Gifford Nielsen, Brigham Young University (football)

See: All-Time Honors Award Winners

== Class of 2004 ==
- Trish Millines Dziko, Monmouth University (basketball/volleyball/softball)
- Bruce Furniss, University of Southern California (swimming and diving)
- Virginia Gilder, Yale University (rowing)
- Stacey Johnson, San Jose State University (fencing)
- Greg Kelser, Michigan State University (basketball)
- Kellen Winslow, University of Missouri (football)

See: All-Time Honors Award Winners

== Class of 2005 ==
- Mark Johnson, University of Wisconsin (ice hockey)
- Gary Lawrence, Yale University (ice hockey/golf)
- Paul McDonald, University of Southern California (football)
- Greg Meredith, University of Notre Dame (ice hockey)
- Joan Benoit, Bowdoin College (track and field/field hockey)
- Dave Stoldt, University of Illinois (gymnastics)

See: All-Time Honors Award Winners

== Class of 2006 ==
- Valerie Ackerman, University of Virginia (basketball)
- Danny Ainge, Brigham Young University (basketball)
- Charles Davis, Vanderbilt University (basketball)
- Terry Schroeder, Pepperdine University (water polo)
- Mike Singletary, Baylor University (football)
- Susan Wellington, Yale University (swimming/softball)

See: All-Time Honors Award Winners

== Class of 2007 ==
- Gail Koziara Boudreaux, Dartmouth College (basketball/track and field)
- Rowdy Gaines, Auburn University (Swimming and diving)
- Steve Jordan, Brown University (football)
- Patricia Melton, Yale University (track and field)
- Ann Woods Smith, University of Florida (gymnastics)
- William Stetson, University of Southern California (volleyball)

See: All-Time Honors Award Winners

== Class of 2008 ==
- Theresa Andrews, University of Florida (swimming)
- Todd Blackledge, Penn State (football)
- Cormac Carney, UCLA (football)
- Anne Donovan, Old Dominion University (basketball)
- Dot Richardson, UCLA (softball/basketball)
- Robin Roberts, Southeastern Louisiana University (basketball)
- Bob Woodruff, Colgate University (lacrosse)

See: All-Time Honors Award Winners

== Class of 2009 ==
- Deitre Collins-Parker, Hawaii (volleyball/basketball)
- Mark Fusco, Harvard (ice hockey)
- Earl G. Graves, Jr., Yale (basketball)
- Darrell Green, Texas A&M-Kingsville (football/track)
- Kathryn McMinn, Georgia (gymnastics)
- Steve Young, Brigham Young (football)

See: All-Time Honors Award Winners

== Class of 2010 ==
- Gregg Carr, Auburn (football)
- Jack Del Rio, USC (football)
- Doug Flutie, Boston College (football)
- Jackie Joyner-Kersee, UCLA (track and basketball)
- Maureen O'Toole-Purcell, Hawaiʻi (swimming and water polo)
- Deb Richard, Florida (golf)

See: All-Time Honors Award Winners

== Class of 2011 ==
- Lisa Caputo, Brown (field hockey and lacrosse)
- Teresa Edwards, Georgia (basketball)
- Joe Girardi, Northwestern (baseball)
- Tim Green, Syracuse (football)
- Bo Jackson, Auburn (football, track, and baseball)
- Scott Verplank, Oklahoma State (golf)

See: All-Time Honors Award Winners

== Class of 2012 ==
- Tim Brown, Notre Dame (football)
- Doris Burke, Providence (basketball)
- Kevin Johnson, California (basketball)
- Sean Payton, Eastern Illinois (football)
- Amy Privette Perko, Wake Forest (basketball)
- David Robinson, Navy (basketball)

See: All-Time Honors Award Winners

== Class of 2013 ==
- Bob Cottingham, Columbia (fencing)
- Dylann Duncan Ceriani, BYU (volleyball)
- Gail Devers, UCLA (track and field)
- Chad Hennings, Air Force (football)
- Keith Jackson, Oklahoma (football)
- Patrick McEnroe, Stanford (tennis)

See: All-Time Honors Award Winners

== Class of 2014 ==
- Troy Aikman, UCLA (football)
- Rodney Peete, USC (football and baseball)
- Earl Martin Phalen, Yale (basketball)
- George Pyne, Brown (football)
- Katey Stone, New Hampshire (ice hockey and lacrosse)
- Dara Torres, Florida (swimming and volleyball)

See: 2014 press release

== Class of 2015 ==
- Jennifer Azzi, Stanford (basketball)
- Brent Lang, Michigan (swimming)
- Pellom McDaniels, Oregon State (football)
- Bernard Muir, Brown (basketball)
- Mike Mussina, Stanford (baseball)
- Tamyra Rogers, Oklahoma (basketball)

See: 2015 press release

== Class of 2016 ==
- Abby Cheng, Arkansas State (volleyball)
- Chris Howard, Air Force (football)
- Joé Juneau, RPI (ice hockey)
- Russell Maryland, Miami (FL) (football)
- Dikembe Mutombo, Georgetown (basketball)
- Steve Smith, Michigan State (basketball)

See: 2016 press release

== Class of 2017 ==
- Ty Detmer, BYU (football)
- Alonzo Mourning, Georgetown (basketball)
- Susan Robinson Fruchtl, Penn State (basketball)
- Heather Taggart, Wisconsin (soccer)
- Tommy Vardell, Stanford (football)
- Troy Vincent, Wisconsin (football)

See: 2017 press release

== Class of 2018 ==
- Jason Elam, Hawaiʻi (football)
- Julie Foudy, Stanford (soccer)
- Jim Hansen, Colorado (football)
- Nnenna Lynch, Villanova (cross-country and track)
- David Morrow, Princeton (lacrosse)
- Lance Pilch, Air Force (baseball)

See: 2018 press release

== Class of 2019 ==
- Tim Cullen, Air Force (fencing)
- Mia Hamm, North Carolina (soccer)
- David Hirsch, Cornell (wrestling)
- Lisa Leslie, USC (basketball)
- Heath Shuler, Tennessee (football)
- Jason Varitek, Georgia Tech (baseball)

See: 2019 press release

== Class of 2020 ==
- Carla Ainsworth, Kenyon (swimming and diving)
- Stewart Cink, Georgia Tech (golf)
- Darren Eales, Brown (soccer)
- Rebecca Lobo, UConn, (basketball)
- Jenny Thompson, Stanford, (swimming and diving)
- Adam Vinatieri, South Dakota State (football)

See: 2020 press release

== Class of 2021 ==
- Shareef Abdur-Rahim, Cal (basketball)
- Adam Burgasser, UC San Diego (swimming and diving)
- Michelle M. Marciniak, Tennessee (basketball)
- Fernando Palomo, Texas A&M (track and field)
- Amy Reinhard, Harvard (softball, basketball)
- Dan Rooney, Kansas (golf)

See: 2021 press release

== Class of 2022 ==
- Maiya Anderson, Air Force Academy (swimming and diving)
- Tim Duncan, Wake Forest (basketball)
- Warrick Dunn, Florida State (football)
- Matthew Humphreys, UC Santa Cruz (swimming and diving)
- Katie King-Crowley, Brown (ice hockey, softball)
- Tina Thompson, Southern Cal (basketball)

See: 2022 press release

== Class of 2023 ==
- Phil Dawson, Texas (football)
- Allison Feaster, Harvard (basketball)
- Marsha Harris, New York University (basketball)
- Lenny Krayzelburg, Southern Cal (swimming and diving)
- Peyton Manning, Tennessee (football)
- Kate Markgraf, Notre Dame (soccer)

See: 2023 press release

== Class of 2024 ==
- Nicole Aunapu Mann, Navy (soccer)
- Jerry Azumah, New Hampshire (football)
- Shannon Boxx, Notre Dame (soccer)
- John Cena, Springfield College (football)
- Misty May-Treanor, Long Beach State (volleyball)
- Cindy Parlow Cone, North Carolina (soccer)

See: 2024 press release

== Class of 2025 ==
- Danielle Donehew, Georgia Tech (basketball)
- Isaiah Kacyvenski, Harvard (football)
- Matt Kuchar, Georgia Tech (golf)
- Ronda Jo Miller, Gallaudet (basketball, volleyball)
- Keiko Price, UCLA (swimming and diving)
- Kerri Walsh Jennings, Stanford (volleyball)

See: 2025 press release

== Class of 2026 ==
- Nick Ackerman, Simpson (wrestling)
- Drew Brees, Purdue (football)
- Tamika Catchings, Tennessee (basketball)
- Lauren Witmer, Millersville (tennis)

See: 2026 press release
