= Sally Roberts =

Sally Roberts may refer to:

- Sally Roberts Jones (born 1935), née Sally Roberts, writer
- Sally-Ann Roberts, newscaster
- Sally Roberts (wrestler) (born 1980), American wrestler
