= International Women's Sports Hall of Fame =

This is a list of female sports athletes who have been inducted into the International Women's Sports Hall of Fame, which recognizes the athletic and coaching achievements of women. Selections are made worldwide and are based on achievements, breakthroughs, innovative style and ongoing commitment to the development of women's sports. Sports organizations, sports historians and the public may nominate potential candidates and The Hall of Fame Selection Committee votes to select inductees. Since its inception in 1980 under the auspices of the Women's Sports Foundation, a total of 113 athletes and 21 coaches have been inducted. The United States is represented by 94 (70%) of the 134 inductees.

The International Women's Sports Hall of Fame was initially located in East Meadow, New York. In May 2008, its archives were placed in the Sports Museum of America in lower Manhattan. After the Sports Museum of America closed in February 2009, less than nine months later, the women's archives were placed in storage.

== Members of the International Hall of Fame ==
=== Aviation ===
- Bessie Coleman 1992
- Amelia Earhart 1980
- Marie Marvingt (and mountaineering) 1987

=== Badminton ===
- Judy Devlin Hashman 1995

=== Baseball ===
- Toni Stone 1993

=== Basketball ===
- Jody Conradt (Coach Category) 1995
- Lusia Harris 2005
- Ann Meyers 1985
- Cheryl Miller 1991
- C. Vivian Stringer (Coach Category) 2006
- Pat Summitt (Coach Category) 1990
- Tara VanDerveer (Coach Category) 1998
- Margaret Wade (Coach Category) 1992

=== Bowling ===
- Marion Ladewig 1984

=== Cycling ===
- Connie Carpenter-Phinney 1990

=== Diving ===
- Min Gao 2003
- Pat McCormick 1984
- Micki King 1983
- Aileen Riggin Soule 1988

=== Equestrian ===
- Liz Hartel 1994

=== Fencing ===
- Ilona Schacherer-Elek 1989
- Nikki Tomlinson Franke (Coach Category) 2002

=== Golf ===
- Patty Berg 1980
- JoAnne Carner 1987
- Charlotte Dod (and tennis, archery) 1986
- Sandra Haynie 1999
- Betty Hicks 1995
- Hisako Higuchi 2008
- Betty Jameson 1999
- Carol Mann 1982
- Eleanora Sears (and polo, squash) 1984
- Betsy Rawls 1986
- Louise Suggs 1987
- Glenna Collett Vare 1981
- Linda Vollstedt (Coach Category) 2003
- Kathy Whitworth 1984
- Mickey Wright 1981
- Mildred "Babe" Didrikson Zaharias (and track and field) 1980

=== Gymnastics ===
- Věra Čáslavská 1991
- Nadia Comaneci 1990
- Muriel Grossfeld (Coach Category) 1991
- Ágnes Keleti 2001
- Olga Korbut 1982
- Larissa Latynina 1985
- Shannon Miller 2008
- Mary Lou Retton 1993
- Ludmilla Tourischeva 1987

=== Hockey ===
- Constance Applebee (Coach Category) 1991

=== Judo ===
- Rusty Kanokogi (Coach Category) 1994

=== Lacrosse ===
- Tina Sloan Green (Coach Category) 1999

=== Marathon ===
- Joan Benoit Samuelson 1999
- Grete Waitz 1995

=== Motor racing ===
- Janet Guthrie 1980

=== Mountaineering ===
- Marie Marvingt (and aviation) 1987

=== Orienteering ===
- Annichen Kringstad 1995

=== Shooting ===
- Margaret Murdock 1988

=== Skating ===
==== Figure skating ====
- Tenley Albright 1983
- Ludmila Belousova 1992
- Mabel Fairbanks (Coach Category) 2001
- Peggy Fleming 1981
- Dorothy Hamill 1998
- Sonja Henie 1982
- Carol Heiss Jenkins 1992
- Irina Rodnina 1988
- Barbara Ann Scott-King 1997
- Theresa Weld Blanchard 1989
- Katarina Witt 2005

==== Ice dancing ====
- Jayne Torvill 2002

==== Speed skating ====
- Bonnie Blair 2001
- Dianne Holum (Coach Category) 1996
- Kit Klein 1993
- Lydia Skoblikova 1996
- Sheila Young 1981

=== Skiing ===
==== Alpine skiing ====
- Crystal Cranz 1991
- Diana Golden Brosnihan 1997
- Andrea Mead Lawrence 1983
- Annemarie Moser-Proell 1982

==== Water skiing ====
- Willa McGuire Cook 1990

=== Squash ===
- Heather McKay 2003
- Eleanora Sears (and golf, polo) 1984

=== Softball ===
- Sharron Backus (Coach Category) 1993
- Sue Enquist (Coach Category) 2008
- Joan Joyce 1989
- Marjorie Wright (Coach Category) 2005

=== Swimming ===
- Shirley Babashoff 2000
- Tracy Caulkins 1986
- Florence Chadwick 1996
- Ann Curtis 1985
- Gertrude Ederle 1980
- Kornelia Ender 1993
- Janet Evans 2001
- Dawn Fraser 1985
- Shane Gould 2006
- Nancy Hogshead-Makar 2004
- Eleanor Holm 1980
- Mary T. Meagher 1993
- Debbie Meyer 1987
- Diana Nyad 2006
- Donna de Varona 1983

=== Synchronized Swimming ===
- Chris Carver (Coach) 2000
- Gail Emery (Coach) 1997
- Tracie Ruiz 2000

=== Tennis ===
- Maria Esther Bueno 2004
- Maureen Connolly 1987
- Margaret Court 1986
- Charlotte Dod (and golf, archery) 1986
- Chris Evert 1981
- Althea Gibson 1980
- Evonne Goolagong-Cawley 1989
- Billie Jean King 1980
- Suzanne Lenglen 1984
- Martina Navratilova 1984
- Margaret Osborne duPont 1998
- Hazel Wightman 1986

=== Track and field ===
- Evelyn Ashford 1997
- Fanny Blankers-Koen 1982
- Valerie Brisco 2002
- Hassiba Boulmerka 2008
- Chi Cheng 1994
- Alice Coachman 1991
- Betty Cuthbert 2002
- Mae Faggs 1996
- Barbara Jacket (Coach Category) 1995
- Nell Jackson (Coach Category) 1990
- Marjorie Jackson-Nelson 2000
- Florence Griffith Joyner 1998
- Jackie Joyner-Kersee 2003
- Beverly Kearney (Coach Category) 2004
- Irena Kirszenstein Szewinska 1992
- Madeline Manning 1987
- Nawal El Moutawakel 2006
- Wilma Rudolph 1980
- Helen Stephens 1983
- Shirley Strickland 1998
- Wyomia Tyus 1981
- Willye White 1988
- Mildred "Babe" Didrikson Zaharias (and golf) 1980

=== Volleyball ===
- Flo Hyman 1986
