= 2003 World Wrestling Championships – Women's freestyle 59 kg =

Women's freestyle 59 kg at the 2003 World Championships
- Venue: Madison Square Garden
- Dates: 12–14 September 2003
- Competitors: 14 from 14 nations

Medalists
gold medal	Seiko Yamamoto	Japan
silver medal	Natalia Ivashko	Russia
bronze medal	Sally Roberts	United States

The women's freestyle 59 kilograms is a competition featured at the 2003 World Wrestling Championships, and was held at the Madison Square Garden in New York, United States from 12 to 14 September 2003.

== Results ==
Legend

- F — Won by fall

=== Preliminary round ===
==== Pool 1 ====
Pos	Athlete	Pld	W	L	CP	TP	HUN	SWE	BLR
1	Marianna Sastin (HUN)	2	1	1	4	8	—	4–3	4–6
2	Helena Allandi (SWE)	2	1	1	4	6	1–3 PP	—	3–1
3	Liudmila Siomkina (BLR)	2	1	1	4	7	3–1 PP	1–3 PP	—

Source: Official website

==== Pool 2 ====
Pos	Athlete	Pld	W	L	CP	TP	JPN	CAN	TPE
1	Seiko Yamamoto (JPN)	2	2	0	7	18	—	10–1	8–0 Fall
2	Emily Richardson (CAN)	2	1	1	5	11	1–3 PP	—	10–0
3	Huang Yu-ning (TPE)	2	0	2	0	0	0–4 TO	0–4 ST	—

Source: Official website

==== Pool 3 ====
Pos	Athlete	Pld	W	L	CP	TP	USA	ESP	GER	GRE
1	Sally Roberts (USA)	3	3	0	10	20	—	5–0	10–3	5–2 Fall
2	Sebastiana Jiménez (ESP)	3	2	1	6	8	0–3 PO	—	5–0	3–1
3	Stefanie Stüber (GER)	3	1	2	5	3	1–3 PP	0–3 PO	—	WO
4	Konstantina Tsimpanakou (GRE)	3	0	3	1	3	0–4 TO	1–3 PP	0–4 PA	—

Source: Official website

==== Pool 4 ====
Pos	Athlete	Pld	W	L	CP	TP	RUS	UKR	TJK	FRA
1	Natalia Ivashko (RUS)	3	3	0	10	20	—	4–0	5–1	11–0
2	Oxana Shalikova (UKR)	3	2	1	7	12	0–3 PO	—	6–2	6–0 Fall
3	Natalia Ivanova (TJK)	3	1	2	5	6	1–3 PP	1–3 PP	—	3–1
4	Angélique Vaissie (FRA)	3	0	3	1	1	0–4 ST	0–4 TO	1–3 PP	—

Source: Official website

=== Knockout round ===
Semifinals
Marianna Sastin (HUN)	2
Seiko Yamamoto (JPN)	8
Sally Roberts (USA)	5
Natalia Ivashko (RUS)	7

Final
Seiko Yamamoto (JPN)	4
Natalia Ivashko (RUS)	0
Bronze medal match
Marianna Sastin (HUN)	2
Sally Roberts (USA)	8^{F}
