= Billie Jean King Contribution Award =

- Location: New York City
- Country: United States
- Presented by: Women's Sports Foundation
- First award: 1980
- Website: Official website

The Billie Jean King Contribution Award is an annual award granted by the Women's Sports Foundation to an individual or group who has made significant contributions to the development and advancement of women's sports. In 2017, the award was renamed the Billie Jean King Leadership Award.

Past recipients of the Billie Jean King Contribution Award include:

- 1980: Dorothy Harris, Bonne Bell, AIAW
- 1981: Gladys Heldman, Avon Products, AAU
- 1982: NJCAA, Kathrine Switzer, Colgate-Palmolive
- 1983: WIBC, Dr. Christine Wells, Coca-Cola
- 1984: Personal Products, Girls Club of America, Fred (Delano) Thompson (1933-2019)
- 1985: McDonald's, David Foster, Boy Scouts of America
- 1986: Carole Oglesby
- 1987: Eva Auchincloss
- 1988: ABC Sports
- 1989: A Salute to Women in Sports, Volunteers, Contributors and Staff
- 1990: No winner
- 1991: Sara Lee Corporation, Dr. Vivan Acosta, Dr. Linda Carpenter
- 1992: National Women's Law Center
- 1993: Judy Mahle Lutter
- 1994: Cappy Productions
- 1995: Christine Grant
- 1996: Anita DeFrantz
- 1997: Alpha Alexander
- 1998: Linda Bunker
- 1999: Deborah Slaner Larkin
- 2000: Charles M. Schulz
- 2001: Ladies Professional Golf Association
- 2002: Joseph F. Cullman, III
- 2003: Nancy Lopez
- 2004: Robin Roberts
- 2005: No winner
- 2006: Dr. Dorothy Gulbenkian Blaney
- 2007: Michelle Kwan
- 2008: Sony Ericsson WTA Tour
- 2009: The Gatorade Company
- 2010: John "Launny" Steffens
- 2011: Visa
- 2012: Birch Bayh
- 2013: WNBA
- 2014: Tegla Loroupe
- 2015: Don Sabo, Ph.D.
- 2016: Val Ackerman
- 2017: Condoleezza Rice
- 2018: Gail Koziara Boudreaux
- 2019: Sheila C. Johnson
- 2020: Ursula Burns
- 2021: Kim Ng
- 2022: Dawn Staley
- 2023: Stacey Allaster
- 2024: Kimbra Walter and Mark Walter
- 2025: Michele Kang

== See also ==
- List of sports awards honoring women
