= Sports Museum of America =

Coordinates: 40°42′18.52″N 74°0′47.57″W

- Established: May 7, 2008; 18 years ago
- Dissolved: February 20, 2009
- Location: 26 Broadway (Standard Oil Building), Manhattan, New York City, U.S.
- Type: Professional sports hall of fame
- Accreditation: For-profit
- Collection size: 1,100 photographs and 800 artifacts
- Visitors: 125,000
- Founders: Philip Schwalb and Sameer Ahuja
- CEO: Philop Schwalb
- Owner: Meaningful Entertainment Group
- Public transit access: Bowling Green station

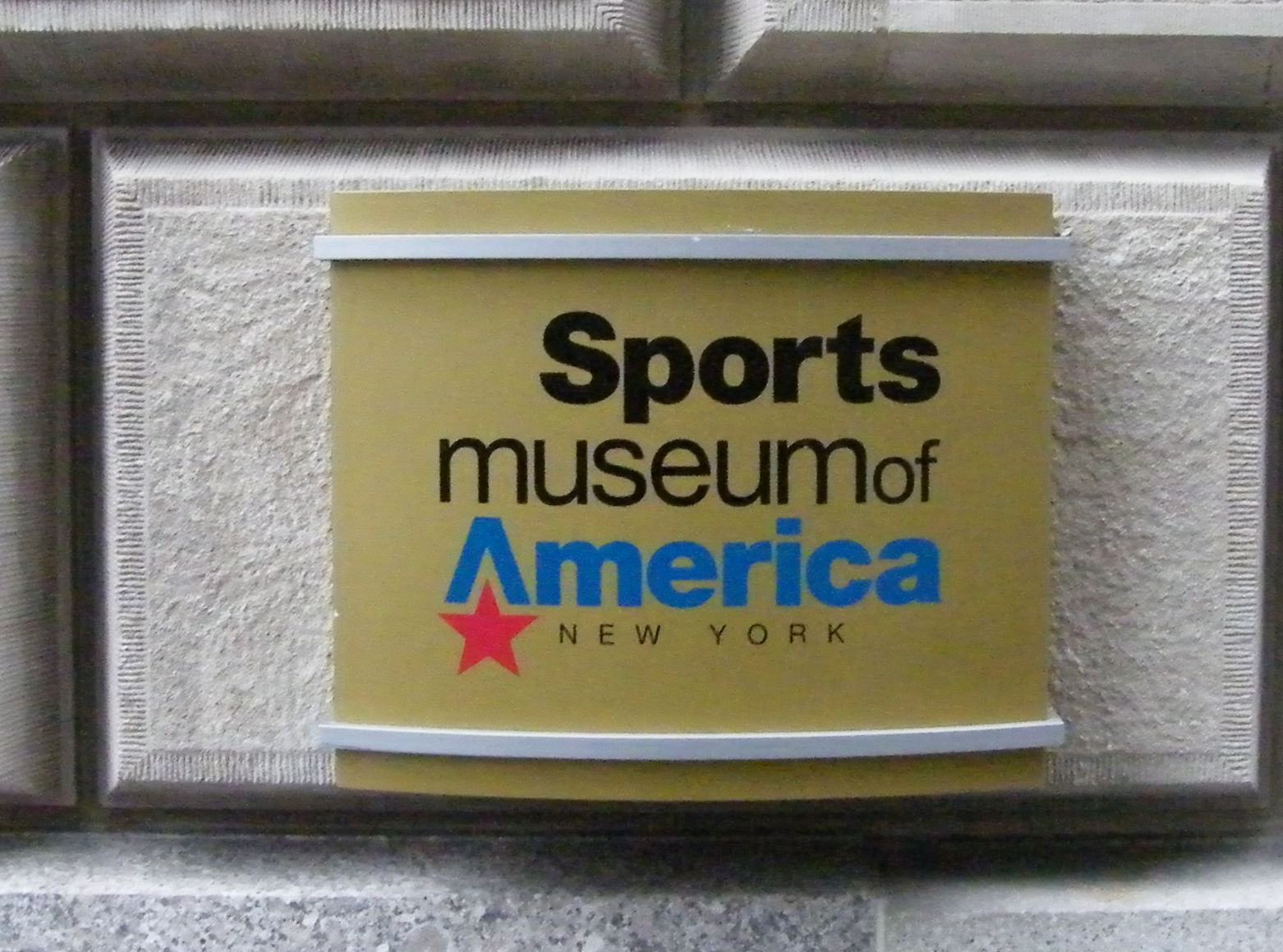
Sports Museum of America logo

The Sports Museum of America (SmA) was the United States' first national sports museum dedicated to the history and cultural significance of sports in America. It opened in May 2008 and closed less than nine months later, in February 2009.

The Sports Museum of America was the nation's first major museum incorporating most major sports. In addition to becoming the official home of the Heisman Trophy and its annual presentation, the museum also housed the first-ever Women's Sports Hall of Fame. Among its board of directors were Mario Andretti, Martina Navratilova, Joe Frazier, Bob Cousy, Billie Jean King, Paul Hornung, and fifty other Hall of Fame athletes.

The museum was located in Lower Manhattan at the end of the Canyon of Heroes, at 26 Broadway, across from Bowling Green, close to the Statue of Liberty and Ellis Island ferry, the Whitehall Terminal of the Staten Island Ferry, Wall Street, and the World Trade Center.

== Overview and collection ==
The Museum became the official home of the Heisman Trophy and the Women's Sports Foundation International Women's Sports Hall of Fame within the Billie Jean King International Women's Sports Center.

Other sports halls of fame and museums, including the National Baseball Hall of Fame, loaned numerous artifacts. Additional artifacts were secured via private collectors. The Sports Museum featured more than 20 original sports films, numerous interactive exhibits, with its 25,000-square-foot exhibition space housing more than 1,100 photographs and 800 artifacts. Individual objects included Michael Phelps' goggles, Dara Torres' swim cap, Sandy Koufax's 1963 Cy Young Award; the ball from Ty Cobb's 3,000th hit, Lou Gehrig's jersey, and the flag Jim Craig wrapped himself in after the U.S. Miracle on Ice during the 1980 Winter Olympics.

The event space on the second floor of the museum featured a mural tribute to sports by famed sports artist LeRoy Neiman.

Tickets to the Sports Museum of America costs $27 for adults and $20 for children.

== History ==
=== Concept and development ===
Founder Philip Schwalb developed the concept in September 2001 following a visit to the Naismith Memorial Basketball Hall of Fame. The museum's plan was to celebrate all sports, and the Canyon of Heroes where New York City's famed ticker-tape parades originated was chosen as the location.

The decision was made to be a commercial organization, rather than a non-profit as many museums are, due to a desire to participate in New York's post-9/11 Liberty bond financing program (available only to for-profit businesses). Ultimately the museum received support from the requisite government officials, most importantly in the form of Liberty bonds issued by the City and the State to support projects aiding in the revitalization of Lower Manhattan. Schwalb and co-founder Sameer Ahuja raised $93 million over a three-year period to finance the museum, which included the aforementioned $57 million in Liberty bonds, as well as $36 million in private funds.

To ensure the museum was collaborative, Schwalb and Ahuja struck agreements with sixty non-profit partners, including every major sports hall of fame in North America and every notable national sport governing body (e.g. USTA, USGA, U.S. Soccer, USA Hockey). They also secured over 200 private investors, primarily Wall Street executives, to finance the museum––getting them to agree to donate 2% of revenues to charity.

=== Opening ceremonies ===
Nearly 100 hall of fame athletes attended the May 7, 2008, opening, with speakers including New York City Mayor Michael Bloomberg, Billie Jean King (speaking on behalf of the Women's Sports Foundation), Tony Dorsett (speaking on behalf of the Heisman Trophy), and New York Giants Super Bowl-winning quarterback, Eli Manning.

=== Challenges ===
Although it received some recognition, including Nickelodeon's Parents' Pick Award for best museum in New York City for children, the museum failed to meet its projected attendance. Pre-opening projections were that one million people would visit during the first year; fewer than 125,000 actually attended. Surveys indicated that 95% of New Yorkers were unaware of its existence. The museum's low-traffic location, coupled with a lack of exterior signage on the nondescript entrance in the Standard Oil Building, added to the museum's relative anonymity.

=== Closure ===
On February 20, 2009 – open less than a year – the museum closed its doors, citing low attendance and $6 million in cost overruns. Management blamed the Great Recession and the related atmosphere in the Lower Manhattan/Wall Street area.

The final tally in overall monies devoted to the effort was $93 million. In March 2009, Schwab offered to sell the museum's collection for $5 million.

HP Newquist, founder of the National Guitar Museum — which has no permanent location — specifically cited the Sports Museum's poor showing in his decision not to locate the National Guitar Museum in New York.

== Partners ==
In an effort to be truly national and collaborative in its representation of all sports, the Museum partnered with more than 60 sporting organizations throughout the United States, and the Hockey Hall of Fame in Toronto (with 30 of those signed up to participate during the concept phase). Exclusive partners included:

- American Museum of Fly Fishing
- College Football Hall of Fame
- Companions in Courage Foundation
- World Figure Skating Hall of Fame
- Heisman Trophy
- Herreshoff Marine Museum/America's Cup Hall of Fame
- Hockey Hall of Fame
- Indianapolis Motor Speedway
- International Boxing Hall of Fame
- International Bowling Museum and Hall of Fame
- International Swimming Hall of Fame
- International Tennis Hall of Fame
- Jackie Robinson Foundation
- Lacrosse Museum and National Hall of Fame
- Museum of Yachting
- NCAA Hall of Champions
- Negro Leagues Baseball Museum
- Naismith Memorial Basketball Hall of Fame
- NASCAR
- National Museum of Racing and Hall of Fame
- National Soccer Hall of Fame
- National Softball Hall of Fame
- National Track and Field Hall of Fame
- National Wrestling Hall of Fame
- Pro Football Hall of Fame
- Special Olympics
- United States Bicycling Hall of Fame
- United States Golf Association
- United States Tennis Association
- US Lacrosse
- United States Olympic Committee
- US Soccer
- USA Basketball
- USA Hockey
- USA Football
- USA Rugby
- USA Softball & Amateur Softball Association
- USA Swimming
- USA Track & Field
- USA Volleyball
- USA Wrestling
- Volleyball Hall of Fame
- Women's Sports Foundation
- World Golf Hall of Fame
