= Women's Sports Foundation =

Sports charity

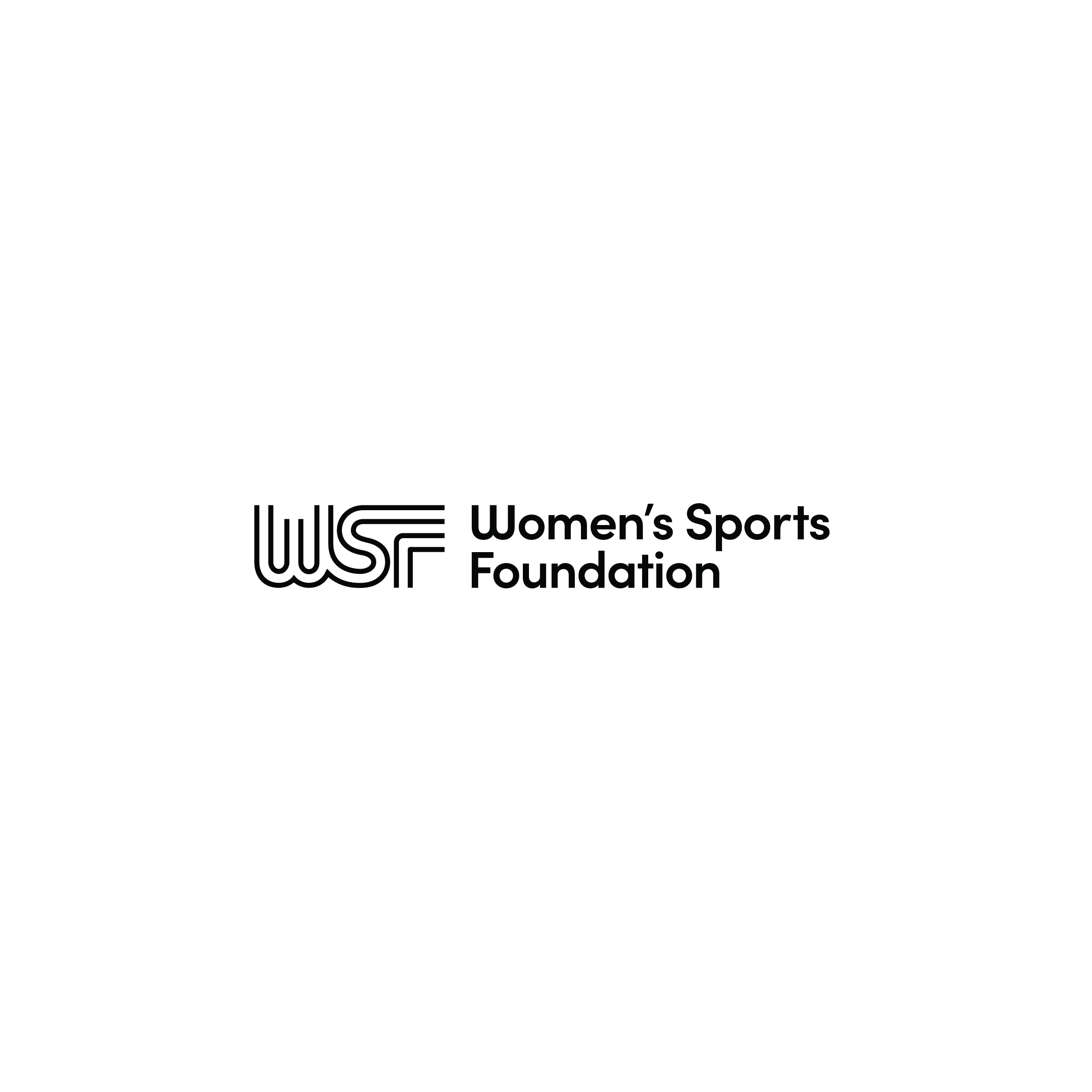
- Founded: 1974
- Founder: Billie Jean King
- Type: 501(c)3 charitable educational foundation
- Purpose: To advance the lives of girls and women through sport and physical activity
- Location(s): 247 West 30th Street; 5th Floor; New York, New York 10001
- Method: Sports advocacy, girls' and women's health, educational projects, grant making, research
- Key people: Chief Executive Officer; Danette Leighton Co-chairs of the Board; Sandra Vivas and Madeline Weinstein President; Meghan Duggan, Hockey
- Employees: 15
- Website: www.womenssportsfoundation.org

The Women's Sports Foundation (WSF) is a 501(c)(3) educational nonprofit charity focused on female involvement in sports. Founded in 1974 by tennis player Billie Jean King and initially supported by Olympic athletes Donna de Varona and Suzy Chaffee, its stated mission statement is "to advance the lives of girls and women through sports and physical activity".

== History ==
The Women's Sports Foundation was legally set up in 1974 by Billie Jean King, her business manager Jim Jorgensen, and her then-husband Larry King. The Foundation was originally supported by Olympic swimmer Donna de Varona and Olympic skier Suzy Chaffee.

In 1972 and in 1973 King was awarded the Bob Hope Cavalcade of Sports for the "Outstanding Female Athlete of the Year". In 1974, she donated her winnings of $5,000 to incorporate the Women's Sports Foundation. Simultaneously, she started a new magazine titled womenSports.

The WSF began its multi-sport emphasis at the 1975 ABC TV show Women's Superstars which was held at the Houston Astrodome. It was there that Donna de Varona working as an ABC Billie Jean King invited the women athlete contestants to join in on the effort.

For ten years, from 1976 to 1986, under the direction of Executive Director, Eva Auchincloss and Associate Director Holly Turner and the Chairwoman Billie Jean King, the Board of Trustees was expanded to include Olympian Peggy Fleming, Peanuts creator Charles M. Schulz, and Vice-President of Bristol-Myers Marvin Koslow, David Foster, CEO of Colgate Palmolive. In 1979, Donna de Varona was appointed the first president of the Foundation. Under the leadership of Executive Director Eva Auchincloss and her team, the foundation grew from an organization with $500 in the bank to one with a $1M endowment and an operating budget of $1M.

In 1990, in recognition of King's long standing efforts to promote the rights of women, Life magazine named her one of the "100 Most Important Americans of the 20th Century",[5] in part because of her promotion of sports for women such as the Women's Sports Foundation.

Women's Sports Foundation advocates equal opportunity for girls and women's sports in the United States and around the world.

Past presidents include Donna de Varona, Carol Mann, Lyn St. James, Nancy Hogshead-Makar, Wendy Hilliard, Benita Fitzgerald Mosley, Nancy Lieberman, Julie Foudy, Dawn Riley, Dominique Dawes, Aimee Mullins, Jessica Mendoza, Laila Ali, Angela Ruggiero, Angela Hucles, Grete Eliassen, Elana Meyers Taylor, Alana Nichols, and Phaidra Knight. The current president is Meghan Duggan and the current Board of Trustees Chair is Sandra Vivas.

A statement by 16 women's rights organizations including the Women's Sports Foundation, the National Women's Law Center, the National Women's Political Caucus, Girls, Inc., Legal Momentum, End Rape on Campus, the American Association of University Women and Equal Rights Advocates said that, "as organizations that fight every day for equal opportunities for all women and girls, we speak from experience and expertise when we say that nondiscrimination protections for transgender people—including women and girls who are transgender—are not at odds with women’s equality or well-being, but advance them" and that "we support laws and policies that protect transgender people from discrimination, including in participation in sports, and reject the suggestion that cisgender women and girls benefit from the exclusion of women and girls who happen to be transgender."

== Initial goals ==
The main goal of the Women's Sports Foundation (WSF) was to educate women and the general public. The WSF mainly wanted to educate with respect to the idea of women in sports and the ongoing discrimination against women in sports. The WSF also wanted to normalize the female athlete's capabilities and achievements on the same playing field as men. Promoting equal rights and opportunities for female athletes was a big issue that the WSF really pushed. Once this issue started to resolved, more women participating in sports became a popular trend. This was a trend that lead to an important subject for feminist attention because sports helped these women shape their own, personal identities. The WSF also wanted to support women in their athletic good sportsmanship and keep encouraging fair play in the sports world. However, most importantly, the WSF really encouraged and supported the participation of women in sports for their overall health, enjoyment, and future career opportunities.

== Current initiatives and programs ==
Sports 4 Life: In October 2014, the Women's Sports Foundation, with support from espnW, launched Sports 4 Life, a national effort to increase the participation and retention of African-American and Hispanic girls, ages 11–18, in developmental youth sports programs. Through education, public awareness and grants to organizations nationwide, Sports 4 Life seeks to effect sustainable improvement to the overall health and development of girls in these communities.

The Travel & Training Fund: The WSF was the first—and only—charitable organization to offer grants to aspiring women athletes with elite potential when it established the grant almost 30 years ago. The Travel & Training Fund provides direct financial assistance to aspiring athletes – in individual and team sports. Travel & Training grants allow serious female athletes a chance to fulfill their potential on the regional, national or international level through assistance for coaching, specialized training, equipment, athletic attire, and/or travel. Since 1984, WSF awarded grants to more than 1300 individual athletes and teams – including figure skaters Michelle Kwan and Rachael Flatt, diver Mary Ellen Clark, ski jumper Alissa Johnson, swimmer Mallory Weggemann and the US National Water Polo Team. The T&T Fund is supported by contributions by donors and WSF national sponsor Gatorade.

GoGirlGo!: The WSF's GoGirlGo! works to improve the health of sedentary girls and to keep girls involved in physical activity. They support programs and organizations that work with girls. GoGirlGo! provides comprehensive support through education, funding, public awareness and networking.

WSF Athlete Ambassador Program is another program within the Women's Sports Foundation. This program uses amateur athletes to professional athletes to work with a group. This works for players who want to serve as role models and help motivate younger players.

== Partners ==
There are some partners with the organization. They are partners with Athleta, ESPNW, Gatorade, NBC Sports Group and Yahoo sports.

== Research and Resource Center ==
SHARP, the Sport, Health and Activity Research and Policy Center for Women and Girls, was established in 2010 as a new partnership between the Women's Sports Foundation and the University of Michigan's School of Kinesiology and Institute for Research on Women & Gender. SHARP's mission is to lead research that enhances the scope, experience, and sustainability of participation in sport, play, and movement for women and girls. Leveraging the research leadership of the University of Michigan with the policy and programming expertise of the Women's Sports Foundation, findings from SHARP research will better inform public engagement, advocacy, and implementation to enable more women and girls to be active, healthy, and successful.

The Women's Sports Foundation Library and Resource Center contains a large collection of books, magazines, articles, photographs, films, videos, and artifacts.

== Outreach ==
The WomenSports magazine was part of the Women's Sports Foundation's outreach. It was one of the first magazines that was dedicated to women in sports that featured female athletes and highlighted their successes. The magazine served as an advertisement purpose with a close connection to Billie Jean King and the Women's Sports Foundation. It focused on the trends and current issues of women in sport and provided background information on certain events. The magazine ultimately folded after years of publication, despite a dedicated following.

== Women's Sports Hall of Fame ==
In October 2006, the Women's Sports Foundation (WSF) and the Sports Museum of America announced the establishment of the Billie Jean King International Women's Sports Center. The museum opened in May 2008 and closed in February 2009.

== Award ceremonies ==
=== Annual Salute to Women in Sports ===
The Annual Salute to Women in Sports celebrates the achievement of female athletes across all sports. Held in October at Cipriani Wall Street in New York City, the Annual Salute features a cast of celebrities, champion athletes and supporters of girls and women in sports. The fundraising gala is a charitable fundraising event with proceeds benefiting the Foundation's grants, research, educational and advocacy-related programming.

The Sportswoman of the Year Award - Team and Individual, the Billie Jean King Contribution Award and the Wilma Rudolph Courage Award are presented during the gala. The Sportswoman of the Year Awards are voted on by the public. Prior to its debut at Cipriani in 2011, the Annual Salute was held at the Waldorf–Astoria and Marriott Marquis hotels in New York City.

==== Wilma Rudolph Courage Award ====
- 1996: Jackie Joyner-Kersee
- 1997: Silken Laumann
- 1998: Willye White
- 1999: Gail Devers
- 2000: Martina Navratilova
- 2001: Michelle Akers
- 2002: Candace Cable
- 2003: Kelly Sutton
- 2004: Julie Krone
- 2005: Yuliana Perez
- 2006: Jean Driscoll
- 2007: 2006-07 Rutger's Women's Basketball Team
- 2008: Patience Knight
- 2009: Tiffara Steward
- 2010: Amy Palmiero-Winters
- 2011: Visa Women's Ski Jumping Team
- 2012: Kayla Harrison
- 2013: Melissa Stockwell
- 2014: Noelle Pikus-Pace
- 2015: Tatyana McFadden
- 2016: Maria Toorpakai Wazir
- 2017: 2017 United States women's national ice hockey team
- 2018: Caster Semenya
- 2019: Marta Vieira da Silva
- 2020: WNBA players
- 2021: Naomi Osaka
- 2022: Elana Meyers Taylor
- 2023: Rosalie Fish
- 2024: 1999 United States women's national soccer team
- 2025: Alysia Montaño

==== ANNIKA Inspiration Award ====
- 2010: Caitlin Baker
- 2011: Winter Vinecki
- 2012: Lianna Thomas
- 2013: Vivian Hao

==== Yolanda L. Jackson Give Back Award ====
- 2010: Michelle Kwan
- 2011: Heather O'Reilly
- 2012: Sarah Hughes
- 2013: Lyn-z Adams Hawkins Pastrana
- 2014: Angela Hucles
- 2015: Elena Hight
- 2016: Sasha DiGiulian
- 2017: Phaidra Knight
- 2017: Esther Lofgren
- 2017: Brenda Villa

==== Darlene Kluka Award ====
- 2001: Barbara L. Drinkwater
- 2003: Mary Jo Kane
- 2005: Kari Fasting
- 2006: Gertrud Pfister
- 2007: Celia Brackenridge
- 2008: Ellen Staurowsky
- 2009: Anneliese Goslin
- 2010: Don Sabo
- 2011: Carole Oglesby
- 2012: Vivian Acosta & Linda Carpenter
- 2017: Maria Beatriz Rocha Ferreira

=== The Billie Awards ===
The Billie Awards (also known as The Billies) was an annual awards ceremony in Los Angeles, California, first held by the Women's Sports Foundation in 2006.

=== Flo Hyman Award ===
The Flo Hyman Memorial Award was conferred annually between 1987 and 2004.

== International Women's Sports Hall of Fame ==
The International Women's Sports Hall of Fame was established in 1980, to give recognition to female athletes who have made history in women's sports. The International Women's Sports Hall of Fame recognizes the athletic achievements of those who have competed at least 25 years prior to the present year in the Pioneer category. Athletes whose accomplishments came within the past 25 years are inducted into the Contemporary category. Selections are made worldwide and are based on achievements, breakthroughs, innovative style and ongoing commitment to the development of women's sports.

== Similar charities ==
- United States Tennis Association
- PeacePlayers International
- Achilles International

== See also ==
- List of sports awards honoring women
- National Girls and Women in Sports Day
- Title IX
- Women's professional sports
- Women's sports
- Women's Sport and Fitness Foundation
