= Stacey Johnson (fencer) =

American fencer

Stacey Rita Johnson is a former Olympic fencer and recipient of the NCAA Silver Anniversary Award.

== Fencing ==
Johnson began fencing competitively at age 11, and by age 16 she had secured her first spot on an international team.

From 1973 to 1975, Johnson was a member of three Junior World Teams, competing in Buenos Aires, Argentina; Istanbul, Turkey; and Mexico City, Mexico. From 1976 to 1979, she was a four-time All American and four-time National Collegiate Team Champion, winning the National Collegiate Championship in 1976 and 1979, and amassing the Collegiate individual record for team wins over losses, at 305 to 1. She was also a member of the World University Games Teams in 1977 and 1979.

Johnson earned a spot on the 1980 U.S. Olympic Fencing Team, but the team did not compete due to the 1980 Summer Olympics boycott. She was one of 461 athletes to receive a Congressional Gold Medal years later. She served on the United States Olympic Committee Board of Directors from 1996 to 2004, and was on that body's executive committee from 2003 to 2004 and Vice President of the National Governing Body Council from 2002 to 2004.

Johnson became the first woman to hold a four-year term as President of United States Fencing.

She was elected to serve as President of the International Federation for Fencing (FIE) Women & Fencing Council from 2012 to 2016 and was re-elected to the Council and as president for 2016–2020.

== Career ==
In Higher Education, Johnson joined the administration of Palo Alto College in 1985. There, she held various posts, including Director of Marketing; Assistant to the President; founding faculty member for the Communications Program; Department Chair of English, Communications & Foreign Languages; Dean of Arts, Humanities & Social Sciences; and finally, Vice President of Academic Affairs in 2008. In August 2012, she joined the administration of Valencia College in Orlando, Florida, as Campus President of East and Winter Park Campuses.

== Honors ==
Johnson was named an NCAA Silver Anniversary Award winner in 2005. She also earned admission to the CoSIDA Academic All American Hall of Fame in July 2017. Johnson was inducted into the San Jose State University Hall of Fame in 2003, the San Antonio Sports Hall of Fame in 2005 and the Institute for International Sport in 2007.

== See also ==
- List of USFA Hall of Fame members
