= Celia Brackenridge =

British sportswoman and researcher

Celia Brackenridge OBE (22 August 1950 – 23 May 2018) was a British sportswoman, campaigner and academic. In the mid-1980s, Brackenridge was recognised as the most capped Great Britain lacrosse player. She founded the Women's Sports Foundation UK and also conducted research into the physical and sexual abuse of young sportspeople by coaches.

== Early life and education ==
Brackenridge was born in Hitchin, Hertfordshire. She attended Lady Eleanor Holles School, followed by the Bedford College of Education to train as a physical education teacher and subsequently transferred for a year to Cambridge University, from where she graduated with a first-class honours degree in education. She was the first physical education student in the UK to graduate with a first. Brackenridge was also awarded a double blue for playing national-level lacrosse and county-level cricket. She subsequently studied for a master's degree at the University of Leeds. After graduating, she worked as a teacher at Bournemouth School for Girls and then as a lecturer at Lady Mabel College of Physical Education.

== Lacrosse ==
Brackenridge began playing lacrosse while she was at the Lady Eleanor Holles School, and joined Putney Ladies' Lacrosse Club by the age of 15. She was selected for the first ever Surrey Junior team, and later the Junior South team.

In the mid-1980s, Brackenridge was recognised as the most capped Great Britain lacrosse player. She played for England for 14 years. She was Captain between 1979 and 1982, including at the first Women's Lacrosse World Cup.

She subsequently coached the England team, and served as Assistant Coach for the Harvard University Lacrosse team. She was influential in introducing American innovations in equipment and playing style (e.g. plastic lacrosse sticks and ambidextrous stick-handling skills) to the UK.

== Research and activism ==
Brackenridge founded the Women's Sports Foundation UK, which is now known as the Women in Sport. She also conducted research into the physical and sexual abuse of young sportspeople by coaches, for which she received hate mail and experienced obstruction from sports governing bodies. The English Football Association agreed to provide her with funding in 2000 to investigate clubs' child protection processes and monitor the FA's junior player protection strategy, but ended the project after two years due to what were described as "budget cuts". According to an obituary published in The Independent, the ending of the funding was a "result of internal disputes within the FA, and a disagreement between Adam Crozier, then FA chief executive, and Premier League clubs, which objected to the project". An obituary in The Sunday Times reflected: "As it turned out, the world of football was not ready for a gay former lacrosse international rummaging through its dirty linen". Later, Brackenridge worked with and advised organisations including UNICEF, the NSPCC, the International Olympic Committee and FIFA.

Brackenridge joined Cheltenham and Gloucester College of Higher Education in 1994, where she was professor of sport and leisure. She moved to Brunel University as professor and director of the Centre for Youth Sport and Athlete Welfare in 2005 and retired in 2010, becoming professor emerita. She was awarded an honorary Fellowship by the University of Chichester in 2010. Brackenridge was appointed an Officer of the Order of the British Empire (OBE) in the 2012 New Year Honours for services to equality and child protection in sport. Between 1994 and 2010, she convened the Sexual Harassment Task Force for Women Sport International. Brackenridge's work was recognised with a Lifetime Achievement Award at the 2016 Sunday Times Sportswomen of the Year Awards.

== Personal life ==
Brackenridge's partner was Diana Woodward, with whom she entered into a civil partnership in 2006. Brackenridge died in May 2018 of leukaemia.

== Selected publications ==
- Brackenridge, Celia; Pitchford, Andy; Russell, Kate; Nutt, Gareth (2007). Child Welfare in Football: An Exploration of Children's Welfare in the Modern Game. London: Routledge. ISBN 9780415372336.
