= Alpha Alexander =

American activist

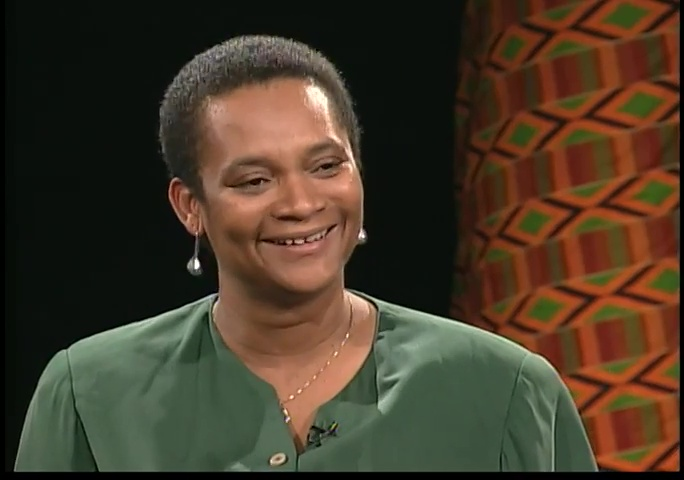
- Alexander on CUNY TV's African American Legends, 1997
- Born: 9 June 1954; Nashville, Tennessee
- Education: The College of Wooster; Temple University

Alpha Alexander (born June 9, 1954) was co-founder of the Black Women in Sport Foundation.

== Early life and education ==
Alpha Alexander was born June 9, 1954, in Nashville, Tennessee to parents Alpha Omega Alexander and Rufus S. Alexander. Alexander's mother was an elementary school teacher in Dayton, Ohio. Alexander's father graduated from the University of Wisconsin and worked for the United States Post Office. Alexander later moved to Dayton, Ohio where she grew up.

Alexander attended Blairwood Elementary and went to Jefferson High School. Alexander was unable to play sports at Jefferson High School due to sports not being offered to girls. Alexander then went on to attend The College of Wooster in 1976 where she earned a bachelor's degree in physical education. While there she played volleyball (1973–1975), lacrosse, tennis, and basketball (1972–1976). Alexander earned her master's degree in 1978 and doctorate degree in 1981 at Temple University in Pennsylvania.

== Career ==
In 1976, Alexander began her career as a graduate assistant in women's athletics at Temple University. She was the assistant women's athletic director while there from 1980 to 1983 and the women's athletic director from 1981 to 1983. She went on to work at women's sports foundation from 1985 to 1986. In 1986 she worked at the YWCA of San Francisco as health and wellness director until 1987 until she became the health and sports advocacy for YWCA of the USA National Office.

In 1990 Alexander became special assistant to the chief executive officer of the YWCA. Alexander then worked as Chancellor to the New York City Board of Education Office in 2000–2001. Alexander taught at Walter State Community College from 2001 to 2005 and Lane College from 2005 to 2007. Alexander served on the Olympic and Pan-American Sports Advisory Council, the United States Olympic Committee Board of Directors, and was president of the Arthur Ashe Foundation. In 1992 Alexander co founded the Black Women in Sport Foundation with Tina Sloan Green, Nikki Franke, and Linda Greene. They met while at Temple University. Currently Alexander is the chairperson of the Morristown Taskforce on Diversity.

== Awards and honors ==
- 1993: College of Wooster - Hall of Fame
- 1995: Black Enterprise Magazine (as one of the 30 most valuable professionals in the business of sports in the USA)
- 1995: Women's Sports Foundation President Award
- 1996: Olympic Shield Award (second woman ever to receive this award from US Olympic Committee)
- 1996: The New York Times Women of the Year Sport Award
- 1997: Billie Jean King Contribution Award (Women Sports Foundation)
- 2001: NCAA Silver Anniversary Award
- 2006: NCAA 100 Most Influential Student Athletes in History (ESPN Classic)
- 2008: College of Wooster - Distinguished Alumni
- 2013: National Girls and Women Sport Award from AAHPERD (previous year winners were Michelle Obama and Pat Summit)
- 2019: Black Woman In Sport Foundation - Glass Ceiling Breaker Award

== Publications ==
They Carried Us: The Social Impact of Philadelphia's Black Women Leaders Alexander is showcased in this book
