= Barbara Jacket =

American track and field coach (1934–2022)

Biographical details
- Born: December 26, 1934; Port Arthur, Texas, U.S.
- Died: January 6, 2022 (aged 87); Richmond, Texas, U.S.

Coaching career (HC unless noted)
- 1965–1991: Prairie View A&M

Administrative career (AD unless noted)
- 1990–1995: Prairie View A&M

Barbara J. Jacket (December 26, 1934 – January 6, 2022) was an American track and field coach. She was the women's track and field head coach for Prairie View A&M from 1965 to 1991. While with the university, Jacket won ten National Association of Intercollegiate Athletics titles and was promoted to athletic director in 1990. Apart from college athletics, Jacket was the head coach at the 1992 Summer Olympics for the American women's track and field competitors. Her position made her the second African-American woman to become an Olympic head coach for the United States. Additional events where Jacket coached the women's track and field team for the United States were the 1987 World Championships in Athletics and 1991 World Championships in Athletics. Jacket was inducted into the International Women's Sports Hall of Fame in 1995.

== Early life and education ==
Jacket was born in Port Arthur, Texas, on December 26, 1934, and had two siblings. Growing up, Jacket played several sports including softball and track and field. For her post-secondary education, Jacket went to Tuskegee University with a basketball scholarship and studied physical education for a Bachelor of Science in 1958. She later received a Master of Education at Prairie View A&M University in 1968.

== Career ==
Jacket began her coaching career teaching basketball in Eufaula, Alabama, and Port Arthur, Texas, before joining Prairie View A&M as a swimming instructor in 1964. The following year, Jacket established the Prairie View A&M Panthers and Lady Panthers track and field team in 1965 as their head coach. During her coaching tenure with Prairie View A&M until 1991, Jacket was the winning coach of ten National Association of Intercollegiate Athletics championships and fourteen Southwestern Athletic Conference titles in track and field.

Outside of college athletics, Jacket was an assistant coach for the United States women's national track and field team during the 1979 Pan American Games. As a head coach, she was on the women's track and field team which competed at the 1975 World University Games, 1987 World Championships in Athletics and 1991 World Championships in Athletics for the United States. Her 1992 Summer Olympics head coach appointment made Jacket the second African-American woman to hold this position for the United States. Apart from coaching, Jacket was the athletic director for Prairie View A&M from 1990 to 1995 and taught health for the university during the 2000s. Jacket ended her career with Prairie View A&M in 2010 upon retirement.

== Personal life and death ==
In 1990, Jacket was charged with official misconduct and document fraud for allegedly altering restaurant receipts to increase the amount the university reimbursed her. She agreed to repay the university and perform community service.

Jacket died in Richmond, Texas, on January 6, 2022, at the age of 87.

== Awards and honors ==
She was inducted into the Prairie View A&M University Sports Hall Of Fame in 1992. Additionally, Jacket was named into the International Women's Sports Hall of Fame in 1995 and the U.S. Track & Field and Cross Country Coaches Association hall of fame in 2001.
