= Sophie Power =

British ultrarunner

Personal information
- Born: 1982 (age 43–44)
- Children: 3
- Website: www.sophiepower.com

Sport
- Country: Great Britain
- Sport: ultrarunning

Sophie Power (born 1982) is a British ultrarunner.

In 2023, Power ran her 24 hour personal best of 235.739 km (146.481 mi) in Crawley. Later that year, she represented Great Britain in the IAU 24 Hour World Championship in Taipei, where she ran 227 km (141 mi).

In 2018, a photograph of Power went viral: breastfeeding her three-month old baby whilst participating in the 171 km (106 mi) Ultra-Trail du Mont-Blanc. Power had wanted to defer her race until she was fully fit, having lost a place in an earlier race when pregnant with her first son. Deferment would have been possible if she had suffered an injury but, at the time, pregnancy was seen as a choice and no deferment was possible. The photograph prompted both race organisers and women racers to contact Power. This led to her setting up SheRACES, a not-for-profit, community interest company incorporated in July 2022. The organisation aims to bring about the change necessary to support women athletes. It has produced a series of guidelines for race directors of main, triathlon and elite races to ensure that these races are more inclusive of female athletes. A number of organisations are now registered or officially endorsed by SheRACES as they make their marketing, website images, pregnancy referrals, breastfeeding on the course, availability of period products and toilets, their write ups, award categories, and podium places more woman equal. SheRACES also convinced London Marathon to allow pregnancy deferrals. After her third child was born, Power made a documentary with Hoka about returning to running postpartum. In 2024, Power ran the length of Ireland – 347 miles (558 km) from Malin Head to Mizen Head – in a record time of 3 days 12 hours 8 minutes, gaining a Guinness World Record.

Power is a Trustee of the Charity Women in Sport. She writes for magazines including Runner's World. Her organisation has undertaken research into women's experiences of triathlon events. In August 2025, Power launched a series of women-only races.
