= Donald E. Baxter =

American orthopedic surgeon

Donald Ervin Baxter
- Born: June 2, 1943 (age 82); Atlanta, Georgia
- Education: Doctor of Medicine
- Alma mater: Mercer University
- Occupation: Orthopedic Surgeon
- Notable work: Baxter's Nerve Entrapment
- Spouse: Frances Baxter

Donald Ervin Baxter (born June 2, 1943), also known as Donald E. Baxter is an Orthopedic surgeon based in Houston. He is known for his work in Baxter's Nerve Entrapment.

== Early life and education ==
Baxter was born in Atlanta, Georgia. He completed his BS from Mercer University in 1965. He attended the Medical College of Georgia and received his medical degree in 1969.

== Career ==
In 1970, After doing his internship at University of Texas Health Science Center, Baxter became Fellowship director and Clinical Professor of Orthopedic Surgeon at University of Texas Health Science Center and Baylor College of Medicine in Houston. He was also a Physician for Houston Ballet in 1990.

Baxter served as President of the American Orthopedic Foot & Ankle Society in 1991. In 1984, Baxter discovered a condition, "Baxter's Nerve Entrapment" where pain is felt when the first branch of the lateral plantar nerve becomes entrapped in the medial heel. Baxter has published around 26 peer-reviewed Articles.

== Selected publications ==
- Baxter's the Foot and Ankle in Sport
- Foot & Ankle International (FAI)
- Common Forefoot Problems in Runners
- Nerve disorders in dancers

== Awards ==
Title	Year	result	Refs
NCAA Silver Anniversary Award	1990	Won	
Alumnus of the year: Medical College of Georgia	1965	Won	
