= Lawrence E. Roberts =

Member of the Tuskegee Airmen (1922–2004)

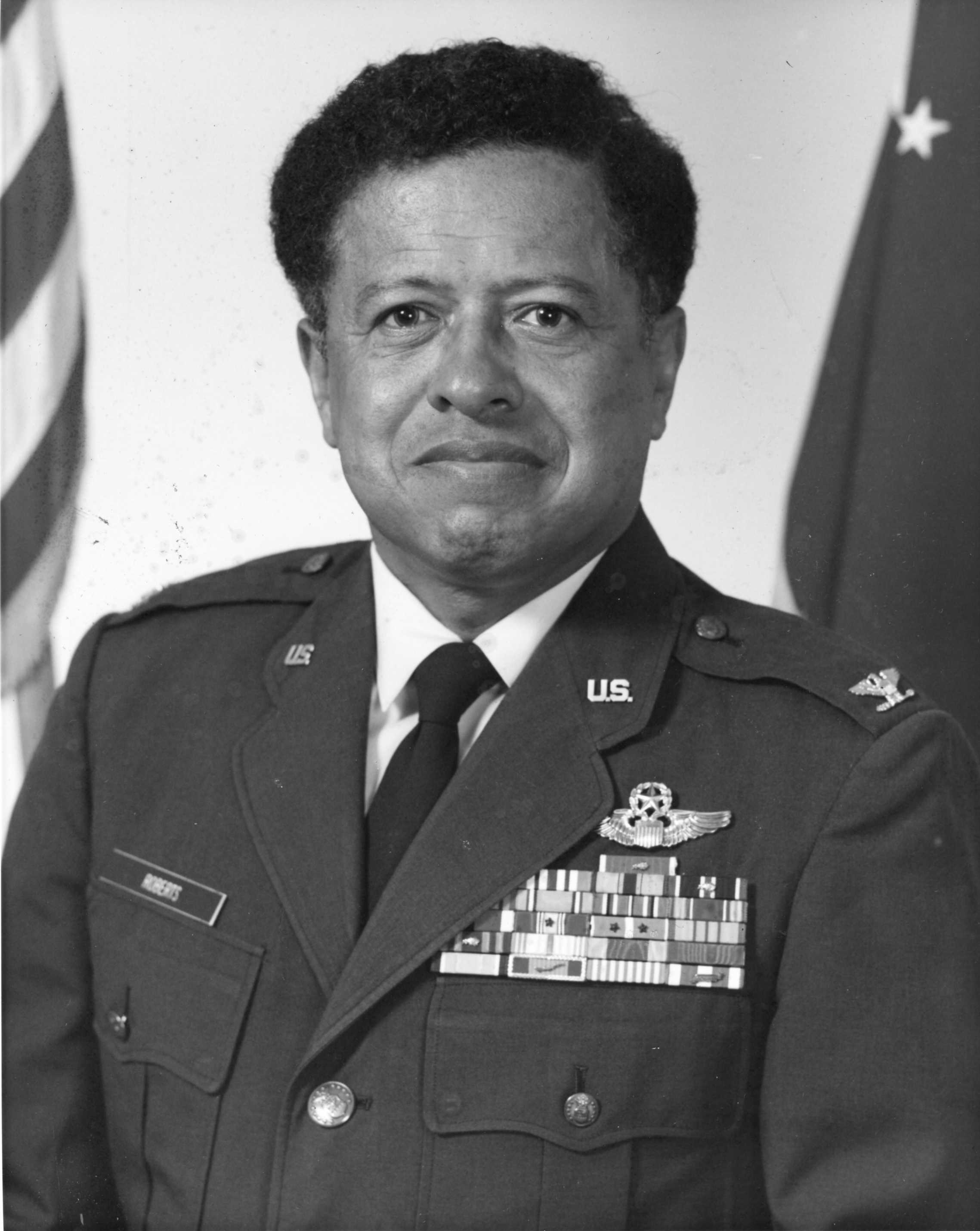
- Colonel Lawrence E. Roberts
- Born: Lawrence Edward Roberts; December 9, 1922; Vauxhall, New Jersey, U.S.
- Died: October 12, 2004 (aged 81); Biloxi, Mississippi, U.S.
- Burial place: Biloxi National Cemetery
- Military career
- Allegiance: United States
- Branch: United States Army Air Forces; United States Air Force
- Service years: 1943–1975
- Rank: Colonel
- Units: 477th Medium Bombardment Group; 332d Fighter Wing
- Conflicts: World War II; Korean War; Vietnam War

Lawrence Edward Roberts (December 9, 1922 – October 12, 2004) was an American pilot with the Tuskegee Airmen and a colonel in the United States Air Force, with 32 years of total military service. He is the father of newscaster Robin René Roberts and Sally-Ann Roberts.

== Personal life ==
Roberts was born on December 9, 1922, in the Vauxhall section of Union Township, Union County, New Jersey. He was married to Lucimarian Tolliver for 57 years. They had four children: Lawrence E. Roberts II, Sally-Ann Roberts Nabonne, Dorothy Roberts, and Robin Roberts. Roberts was an active member of the First Presbyterian Church in Bay St. Louis, Mississippi.

Roberts attended Howard University, received his bachelor's from Morningside College, and received his master's degree from the Tuskegee Institute.

== Military service ==
Roberts entered the United States Army Air Corps at Keesler Air Force Base in 1943. He was assigned to the Tuskegee Airmen program in 1944. Roberts flew Piper Cubs, North American B-25 Mitchell bombers, Douglas C-54 Skymaster transports and North American F-86 Sabre fighter jets. Roberts also served as an instructor in Tuskegee University's Air Force ROTC program from 1958 to 1960.

He served in the Vietnam War and received 18 service medals and awards.

== Later life ==
Roberts was one of the founding members of the Keesler Air Force Base Gospel Service, the oldest Gospel service in the United States Air Force. The only Mississippi chapter of the Tuskegee Airmen Club was named in his honor. On October 12, 2004, Roberts died at his home in Biloxi, Mississippi, at the age of 81 of a heart attack. He was buried with full military honors. Services were held at the Triangle Chapel at Keesler Air Force Base near Biloxi and he was buried at Biloxi National Cemetery.

Since his death, Roberts posthumously received awards throughout the country. In 2004, shortly after he died, the Mississippi Legislature drafted a resolution honoring his life and on March 29, 2007, he posthumously received the Congressional Gold Medal. President George W. Bush honored Roberts with the Congressional Gold Medal for bravery, patriotism and helping persuade President Harry S. Truman to desegregate armed forces. In March 2009, a sculpture by Marlin Miller was dedicated in War Memorial Park in Pass Christian, Mississippi. On September 10, 2009, a new consolidated aircraft maintenance facility for the 403rd Wing at Keesler AFB was dedicated and named in Roberts's honor.

His daughter Robin Roberts executive produced and narrated the one-hour documentary Tuskegee Airmen: Legacy of Courage for History, which premiered on 10 February 2021.

== See also ==
- Dogfights (TV series)
- Executive Order 9981
- Freeman Field Mutiny
- List of Tuskegee Airmen
- Military history of African Americans
- The Tuskegee Airmen (movie)
