= Tina Sloan Green =

Women's lacrosse coach

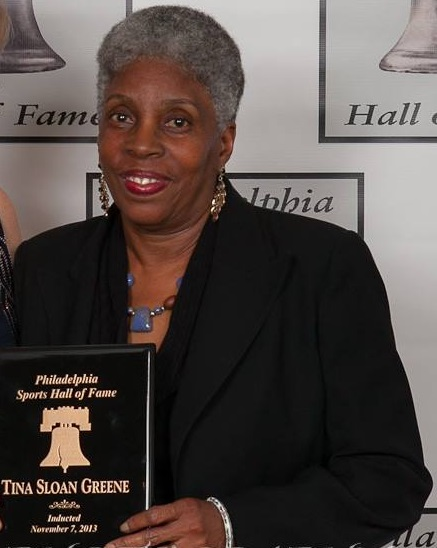

Biographical details
- Born: April 27, 1944 (age 82); Philadelphia, Pennsylvania

Playing career
- 1969–1973: U.S. national field hockey team

Coaching career (HC unless noted)
- 1975–1992: Temple

Head coaching record
- Overall: 207–64–4

Accomplishments and honors

Awards
- Theodore Roosevelt Award (2025)

Tina Sloan Green (born April 27, 1944) is an American former women's lacrosse head coach of the Temple Owls from 1975 to 1992. Apart from coaching, she was the first African-American to play for the United States women's national field hockey team from 1969 to 1973. Sloan Green was inducted into the US National Lacrosse Hall of Fame in 1997, the International Women's Sports Hall of Fame in 1999 and the Philadelphia Sports Hall of Fame in 2013.

== Early life and education ==
Sloan Green was born on April 27, 1944, in Philadelphia, Pennsylvania, to parents Norwood and Sally Sloan who were deeply religious. She has six siblings, Norwood, Gene, Cordelia, Leonette, Beatrice, and Teresa. Sloan Green's parents encouraged their children to complete a high school diploma despite the fact that neither of them had earned a diploma. Sloan Green attended a small school in Eastwick, Pennsylvania from first through eighth grade. The graduating class was only 13 students. Green was designated as gifted and talented before ninth grade and selected to be one of twenty young African American women Philadelphia High School for Girls. While at Philadelphia High School for Girls as a student, Sloan Green was on multiple sports teams due to Coach Jane Weitzenhoffer discovering her abilities and recruiting her to play basketball, volleyball, and field hockey. Green made varsity in each sport. She completed a Bachelor of Physical Education at West Chester University in 1966 and a Masters of Education at Temple University in 1970.

== Career ==
After completing her post-secondary education, she worked at Unionville High School and became the first African American to teach at the school. While there she organized and coached the school's first lacrosse team and was an assistant basketball coach and a physical education teacher. She also worked at William Penn High School as a teacher and assistant coach in basketball. Sloan Green was also a swim coach. From 1969 to 1973, Sloan Green continued her field hockey experience as the first Black American of the United States women's national field hockey team. During her time on the national field hockey team, Sloan Green became the head coach of the Lincoln (Pennsylvania) Lions basketball team in 1973. She also became cheerleader squad coach, a physical education teacher and started a lacrosse team.

Sloan Green went on to coach the Temple Owls women's lacrosse team from 1975 to 1992. As head coach, Sloan Green was the first African American to become head coach of a women's college lacrosse team. In 1982, 1984, and 1984 the Temple Owls women's lacrosse team won the national championship. She led the Owls to 11 NCAA Final Four appearances. She was also field hockey coach, badminton coach, and a teacher at Temple University. After her retirement, she had a career record of 207 wins, 62 losses and 4 ties with the Owls.

Sloan Green retired from coaching after 32 years at Temple. She coached 3 teams to national championships and 2 to second place. Sloan Green was a professor of Sport and Culture in Temple University's College of Education and served as co-principal investor of “Sisters in Sports Science”, which was funded by the National Science Foundation. Sloan Green also served as director of Temple University's National Youth Sports Program (NYSP) for over a decade. Sloan Green then went on to co-found the Black Women in Sport Foundation with Alpha Alexander, Nikki Franke, and Linda Greene in 1992. They met at Temple University. Sloan Green has authored 2 books.

== Challenges ==
After winning the 1984 national championships, Sloan Green did not receive the coach of the year award, which decision was probably affected by her race. It took 10 years for her to be declared coach of the year.

== Personal life ==
Sloan Green is married to Frank Green and has two children, named Traci and Frankie. Traci Green was an All-American tennis player at the University of Florida. She is now head women's tennis coach at Harvard University. She took over the Crimson program in 2007, and led Harvard to a 13–8 overall mark and a 6-1 Frankie Green played tennis at Florida A&M University. In 2006, Frankie Green received Mid-Eastern Athletic Conference Player of the Year. He now coaches tennis at the Upper Dublin Sports Center in Philadelphia.

== Awards and honors ==
In lacrosse, Sloan Green was inducted into the U.S. National Lacrosse Hall of Fame in 1997, the International Women's Sports Hall of Fame in 1999 and IWLCA Hall of Fame in 2017. She was also named a member of the Philadelphia Sports Hall of Fame in 2013. She was awarded the Lifetime Achievement Award at the 6th Annual Shining Star Awards. Sloan Green was inducted into Temple and West Chester University's hall of fame and received the Lifetime Achievement Award from the National Association of Collegiate Women Athletics Administrators. She was the Theodore Roosevelt Award recipient for 2025.

== Publications ==
Modern Womens Lacrosse
