= Wendy Hilliard =

American gymnast (born 1960)

Gymnastics career
- Discipline: Rhythmic gymnastics
- Country represented: United States; (1978-1987)

Wendy Hilliard (born December 11, 1960 in Detroit, Michigan) is an American former rhythmic gymnast. She is a United States Gymnastics Hall of Fame member and the first African American rhythmic gymnast to compete as a member of the U.S. national team.

== Gymnastics career ==
Hilliard began training in artistic gymnastics before she switched to rhythmic. She was the first African American to represent the United States in rhythmic gymnastics in international competition, including at three World Championships (1979, 1981, where she was an alternate, and 1983).

She made her first national championships in 1977, just months after beginning the sport, and she was on the national team for nine years, beginning in 1978. She took a year off from competing in 1982 to travel with a gymnastics show organized by Kurt Thomas. Hilliard was initially denied a spot in the group in 1983, as she was told she "stood out too much"; the decision was eventually reversed, and Hilliard was added to the group.

Although she did not earn a spot to compete at the 1984 Summer Olympics, she assisted the American television commentators with information on rhythmic gymnastics throughout the competition. Afterward, she performed on another gymnastics tour before making another return to competition in late 1985. Hilliard went to Bulgaria to train with Diliana Georgieva and Lilia Ignatova.

== Post-gymnastics career ==
After she retired from competition, Hilliard moved to New York and became a coach; she coached 1996 Olympian Aliane Baquerot Wilson. She served as the first African-American President of the Women’s Sports Foundation from 1995 to 1996, and was also an Olympic sportscaster. She performed in Candide on Broadway in 1997. Hilliard was also the Director of Sports for the New York City 2012 Olympic Bid.

In 1996, she founded the Wendy Hilliard Gymnastics Foundation, which has provided free and low-cost gymnastics for over 15,000 urban youth in New York City. In the fall of 2016, she expanded her gymnastics programs to Detroit, which serves over 200 youth every week through its after-school classes.
