= Wrestle Like a Girl =

Non-profit organisation

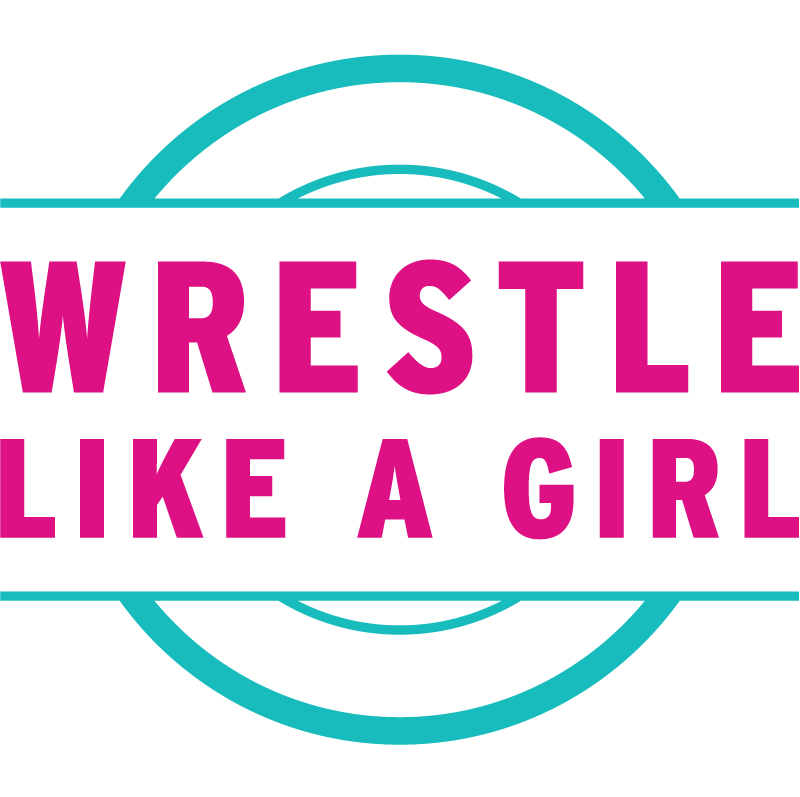
- Formation: 2016; 10 years ago
- Founder: Sally Roberts
- Founded at: Colorado Springs, Colorado
- Type: 501(c)3
- Headquarters: 1140 Third Street, NE, 2nd Floor, Washington, DC 20002
- Founder and CEO: Sally Roberts
- Chair of the Board of Trustees: Maryann Bruce
- Treasurer: Mara Gubuan
- Website: wrestlelikeagirl.org

Wrestle Like a Girl is a non-profit founded by Olympic wrestler Sally Roberts, focused on empowering girls and women through increasing opportunities in female wrestling.

== History ==
Wrestle Like a Girl was originally founded in Colorado by Sally Roberts to provide resources for women seeking to wrestle in college. Roberts was a three-time U.S. National Champion, two-time World bronze medal winner, and a veteran of the War in Afghanistan.

== Advocacy ==
Wrestle Like a Girl has petitioned the NCAA to accept female wrestling as a sanctioned college sport. The organization argues that being an NCAA sport would allow female wrestlers to receive scholarships, health insurance, and other benefits currently only available to male wrestlers.

== Events ==
Wrestle Like a Girl directs wrestling camps for girls aged 5 to 18. In 2018, WLAG partnered with UFC fighters Jessica-Rose Clark and Gina Mazany to host a wrestling clinic in Las Vegas, Nevada.
