= Carole A. Oglesby =

American sports psychologist and athlete

Carole A. Oglesby (1938–?) is an American athlete, physical educator, sports coach, sports psychologist and writer. She is considered among the first openly gay women in U.S. athletics.

== Early life and education ==
Oglesby was born in Fort Smith, Arkansas in 1938. Oglesby and her family spent 10 years in Oklahoma before settling in California.

Oglesby earned her A.B. and her M.S. in physical education at the University of California, Los Angeles, in 1961 and 1964 respectively; in 1969 she received her Ph.D., also in physical education, from Purdue University. Oglesby returned to schooling in the late '90s, earning a Ph.D. in Counseling Psychology from Temple University in 1999.

== Career ==
Oglesby began her professional sports career playing professional softball, competing in national level softball championships in 1962, 1963, and 1965. She coached softball teams at both Purdue University and the University of Massachusetts.

Oglesby has worked as a sports psychology consultant with Olympians and Pan American Games champions in rowing, cycling, and paralympic cycling, as well as with the USA Deaf Women's volleyball team.

She is certified as a trained practitioner in Eye Movement Desensitization Reprocessing (EMDR).

=== Activism ===
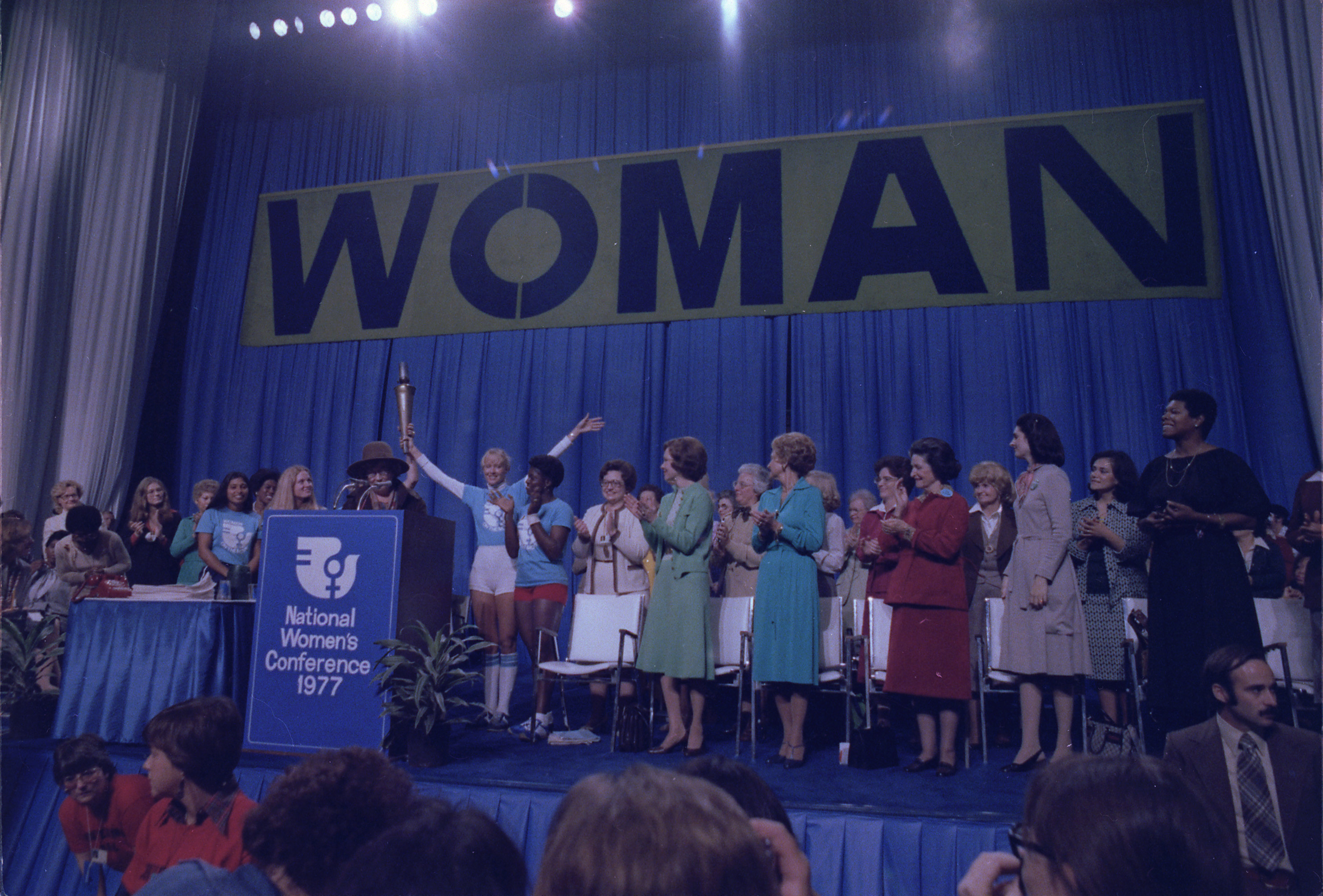
Rosalynn Carter with Betty Ford and Ladybird Johnson at the National Women's Conference.

Oglesby was among a small group of women's sports activists who participated in the 1977 Spirit of Houston National Women's Conference. She joined women from the National Association for Girls and Women in Sport to organize the torch run from Seneca Falls, New York to Houston.

=== Teaching ===
Oglesby taught for many years at Purdue, the University of Massachusetts, Temple University, and at California State University, Northridge, where she headed the Department of Kinesiology).

=== Organizational roles ===
She served as the first president of the Association for Intercollegiate Athletics for Women (AIAW), and as the first president of Women Sport International. Oglesby opposed the merger of the AIAW with the National Collegiate Athletic Association in 1982.

A leader in numerous national organizations, she has served as president of the National Association for Girls and Women in Sport (NAGWS), and as trustee for the Women's Sports Foundation (WSF). She organized WSF's "The New Agenda" conference, which set the research agenda for women in sport in the early 1980s, including homophobia in sport. She also served on the executive committee of the United States Collegiate Sports Council for twenty-five years, an arm of the International Federation of University Sport, which organizes the World University Games. Oglesby has served on the WSF's Homophobia Policy Committee.

== Works ==
- Foundations of Kinesiology (2017) Sudbury: Jones & Bartlett Learning
- Women, Gender Equality and Sport (2007) New York: United Nations
- Exercise and Sport in Feminist Therapy: Constructing Modalities and Assessing Outcomes (with Ruth L. Hall) (2003) Binghamton, N.Y.: Haworth
- Encyclopedia of Women and Sport in America (ed. with Doreen L. Greenberg) (1998) Phoenix: Oryx Press
- Black Women in Sport (with Tina Sloan Green, Alpha Alexander, Nikki Franke) (1981) Reston, Va.: AAPHERD (American Alliance for Health, Physical Education, Recreation, and Dance)
- Psycho-Social Aspects of Physical Education (with Lee A. Bell and Patricia S. Griffin) (1981) Reston, Va.: AAPHERD (American Alliance for Health, Physical Education, Recreation, and Dance)
- Women and Sport: From Myth to Reality (1978) Philadelphia: Lea and Febiger
- Introduction to Human Movement, Pt. II: A Physical Education Text for College Women (with Hope M. Smith) (1967) Reading, Mass.: Addison-Wesley
- Introduction to Human Movement (with Hope M. Smith) (1967) Reading, Mass.: Addison-Wesley

Oglesby has also authored hundreds of articles, editorial columns, book chapters, and book reviews and has also been the editor of several journals relating to education, sport, sex roles, and psychology.

== Awards ==
- Women's Sports Foundation Billie Jean King Contribution Award
- Women's Sports Foundation Darlene Kluka Award
- AAHPERF R. Tait McKinzie Award
- ICSSPE Phillip Noel Baker Research Award
- Women Leaders in College Sports Lifetime Achievement Honoree (2002)
- Purdue University Title IX Distinguished Service Award
