= Dorothy Joan Harris =

Canadian writer (born 1931)

- Born: February 14, 1931 (age 95); Kobe, Japan
- Education: University of Toronto
- Occupation: Writer
- Spouse: Alan Harris (m. 1955)
- Children: 2
- Parent(s): Hubert Langley; Alice Langley
- Writing career
- Genre: Children's literature

Dorothy Joan Harris (born February 14, 1931) is a Japanese-born Canadian writer living in Toronto, Ontario, Canada. She mainly writes children's books.

== Biography ==
The daughter of Hubert and Alice Langley, she was born Dorothy Joan Langley in Kobe and came with her family to St. Catharines, Ontario, in 1938. She received a degree in modern languages from the University of Toronto in 1952 and went on to teach elementary school in France and Japan. She returned to Toronto in 1954 and married Alan Harris in 1955; the couple had two children. From 1955 to 1961, Harris was an editor for Copp Clark Publishers. From 1977 to 1996, she was a public library assistant.

She contributed to the 1999 anthology Too Young to Fight: Memories from our Youth During World War, which received the BolognaRagazzi Award at the Bologna Children's Book Fair. Her 2004 book A very unusual dog was nominated for a Chocolate Lily Award.

== Selected works ==
- The House Mouse, picture book (1973), Japan,
- The School Mouse, picture book (1977)
- Don't Call Me Sugarbaby!, informational novel (1983), diabetes, also available in Braille
- Even If It Kills Me, informational novel (1987), anorexia nervosa
- Four Seasons for Toby, picture book (1987), translated into French as Theo et les Quatre Saisons
- Speedy Sam, young reader (1989), translated into French as Cleo la Souris Expres
- No Dinosaurs in the Park, picture book (1990), translated into French as Pas de Dinosaurs dans le parc
- Annabel the Detective: The Case of the Missing Tooth, young reader (1991)
- Ellen: the wishing time (2004), part of the Our Canadian Girl: Ellen series
- A Very Unusual Dog (2004), Markham, ON: North Winds Press
