= Gail Koziara Boudreaux =

American businesswoman and athlete (born 1960)

Gail Boudreaux
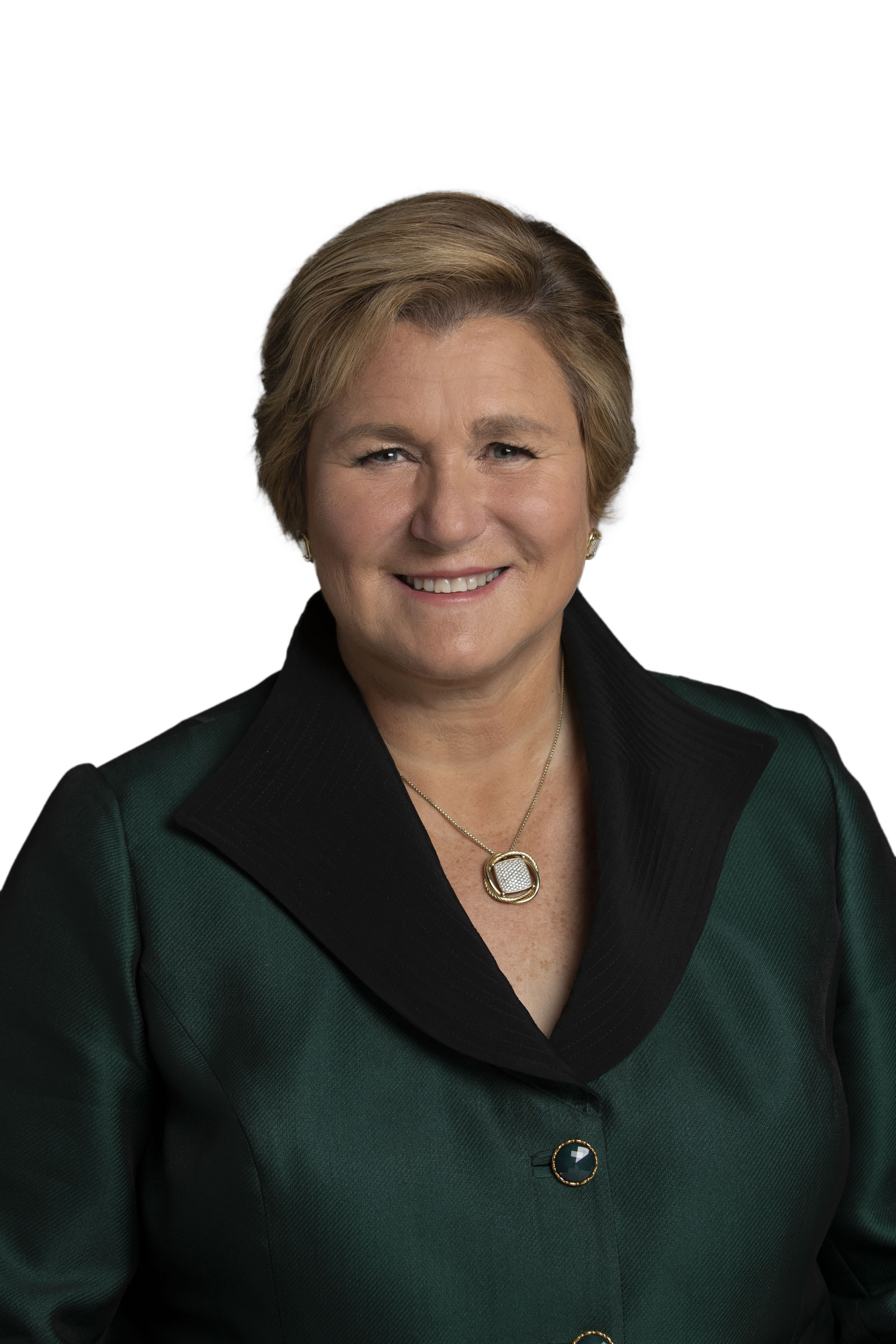
- Born: Gail Koziara; 1960 (age 65–66); Chicopee, Massachusetts, U.S.
- Education: Dartmouth College (BA); Columbia University (MBA)
- Occupation: Businesswoman
- Title: President and CEO, Elevance Health
- Term: 2017–present
- Spouse: Terry Boudreaux
- Children: 2 sons

Gail Koziara Boudreaux (née Koziara, born 1960) is an American businesswoman. She is the president and CEO of Elevance Health since 2017, and has been an executive for other health insurance companies including Aetna, BlueCross BlueShield of Illinois (2002), and UnitedHealth Group (2008).

In 2015, Boudreaux formed her own healthcare consulting company, GKB Global Health, LLC. In 2017, she became CEO of Elevance Health.

== Education ==
Boudreaux attended Chicopee Comprehensive High School in Chicopee, Massachusetts. She was an accomplished basketball player at the school. She graduated cum laude from Dartmouth College in 1982, where she continued her basketball career. She attended business school at Columbia University and graduated with high honors in 1989.

== Career ==
She spent twenty years at Aetna, then in 2002 was named president of Blue Cross/Blue Shield of Illinois. She became the executive vice president for external operations at Health Care Service Corporation, which encompasses Blue Cross/Blue Shield of Illinois.

In May 2008 she became executive vice president of UnitedHealthcare at UnitedHealth Group. From January 2011 to November 2014, she was the chief executive officer of UnitedHealthcare, the biggest US insurer, with 45 million customers and revenue of $120 billion.

In 2015, months after stepping down from her post as CEO of UnitedHealthcare, Gail founded and became CEO of GKB Global Health, LLC, a healthcare strategy and business advisory firm.

In November 2017, Boudreaux was named CEO of Anthem, Inc. which re-branded to Elevance Health, Inc. in 2022.

== Awards and recognition ==
In 2018, Boudreaux was awarded the Billie Jean King Contribution Award. In 2022, she was awarded the Theodore Roosevelt Award, as well as being inducted into the CoSIDA Academic All-America Hall of Fame Class of 2022.

In 2023, Boudreaux became the first female elected chair of The Business Council, an association of top CEOs.

== Personal life ==
She is married to Terry Boudreaux, and resides with him and their two sons in Indianapolis.
