= Sally-Ann Roberts =

American broadcaster

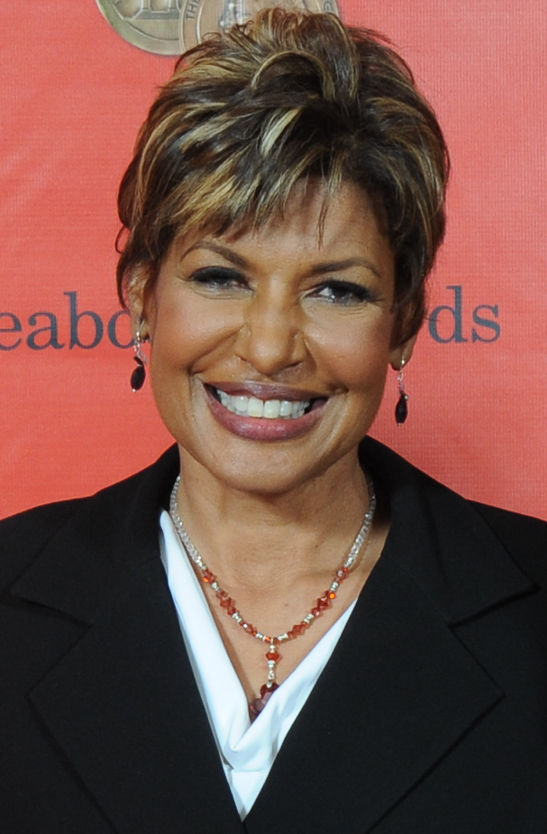
- Roberts in 2013
- Born: Sally-Ann Roberts; February 14, 1953 (age 73); Chandler, Arizona, US
- Education: University of Southern Mississippi
- Occupation: News anchor
- Years active: 1977–2018
- Spouses: Willie Craft (m. 1977; death 2002); Ron Nabonne (m. 2007)
- Children: 1
- Parent: Lawrence E. Roberts (father)
- Relatives: Robin René Roberts (sister)

Sally-Ann Roberts is an American broadcaster. She worked for 40 years in news television before retiring in 2018.

== Early life and career ==
Sally-Ann Roberts was born on February 14, 1953, in Chandler, Arizona, a suburb of Phoenix. She is the daughter of Lawrence and Lucimarian Roberts. Her father was a colonel in the Air Force and was one of the Tuskegee Airmen. Her younger sister Robin Roberts, is a news anchor for Good Morning America. She graduated in 1974 from the University of Southern Mississippi.

=== Broadcaster ===
Roberts worked every other weekend at a Mississippi TV station, WDAM, when she was recruited for WWL-TV in New Orleans, Louisiana by its longtime assistant general manager and news director Phil Johnson on the recommendation of anchor Angela Hill. She was hired as a member of the news team at WWL-TV on March 31, 1977, and co-anchored Eyewitness Morning News with Eric Paulsen. She remained with the station until she retired in 2018.

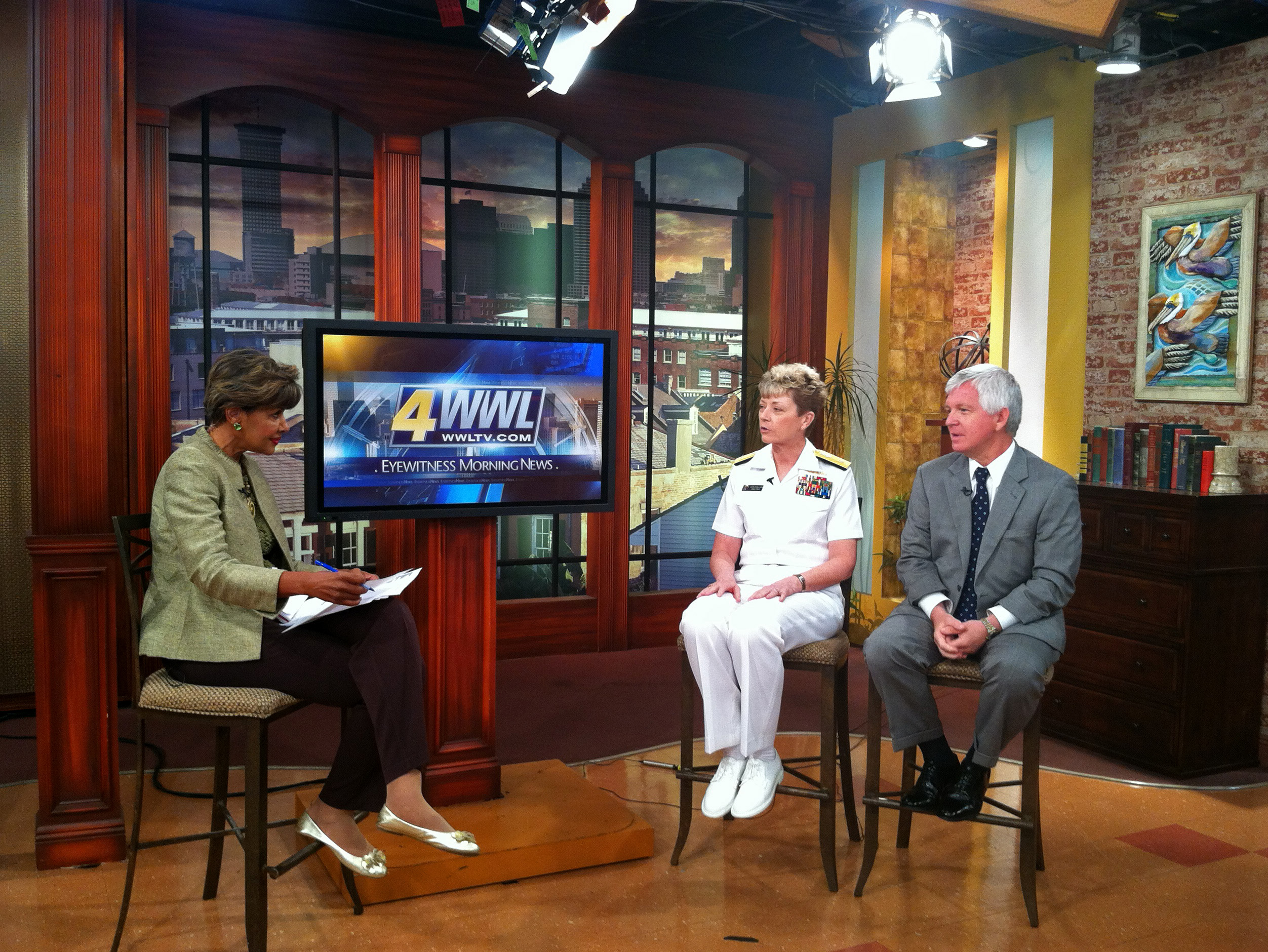
Interviewing Rear Admiral Ann Phillips in 2012

=== Author ===
She is the author of Going Live: An Anchorwoman Reports Good News. With a foreword by her sister Robin Roberts, and photographs by her news colleague Eric Paulsen, Roberts authored an inspirational book, Your Power is On!: A Little Book of Hope.

In addition to these non-fiction books, Roberts authored the novel Angel Vision. She gives motivational speeches around the United States.

== Personal life ==
She is the older sister of Robin Roberts, a co-anchor of ABC's Good Morning America.

== Books ==
- Going Live: An Anchorwoman Reports Good News. Gretna, La.: Pelican Publishing Co., 1998. ISBN 978-1589803022
- Angel Vision. Gretna, La.: Pelican Publishing Co., 2002. ISBN 978-1565549074
- Your Power Is On!: A Little Book Of Hope. Pelican Publishing Co., 2013. ISBN 978-1455619023
