= Women in Sport =

British charity

Women in Sport, formerly the Women's Sport and Fitness Foundation (WSFF), is the UK charity that campaigns to make physical activity an everyday part of life for women and girls. It was founded in 1984 as Women's Sports Foundation (WSF), or Women's Sports Foundation UK. It gains most of its funding through Sport England.

It has funded a range of activities from community education to elite athlete training programmes and seeks to promote women in coaching and administration positions in sport as well as competition through its Women Get Set Go course.

The organisation has a remit to research the barriers women face in sport. This varies from allocations of playing fields through to leadership positions at board level for national governing bodies. In breaking these barriers the organisation has a range of coaching schemes which offer coaching schemes to get women into basic and higher level coaching. The organisation also offers examples of best practice through its What Works for Women resource.

Sophie Power is one of the trustees of the charity.

In 2007 WSF was re-launched as the Women's Sport and Fitness Foundation by the prime minister of the United Kingdom at a high-profile conference held at the Emirates Stadium.

== See also ==
- Women's professional sports
- Women's sports
- Women's Sports Foundation
