= Robin Roberts (newscaster) =

American television broadcaster (born 1960)

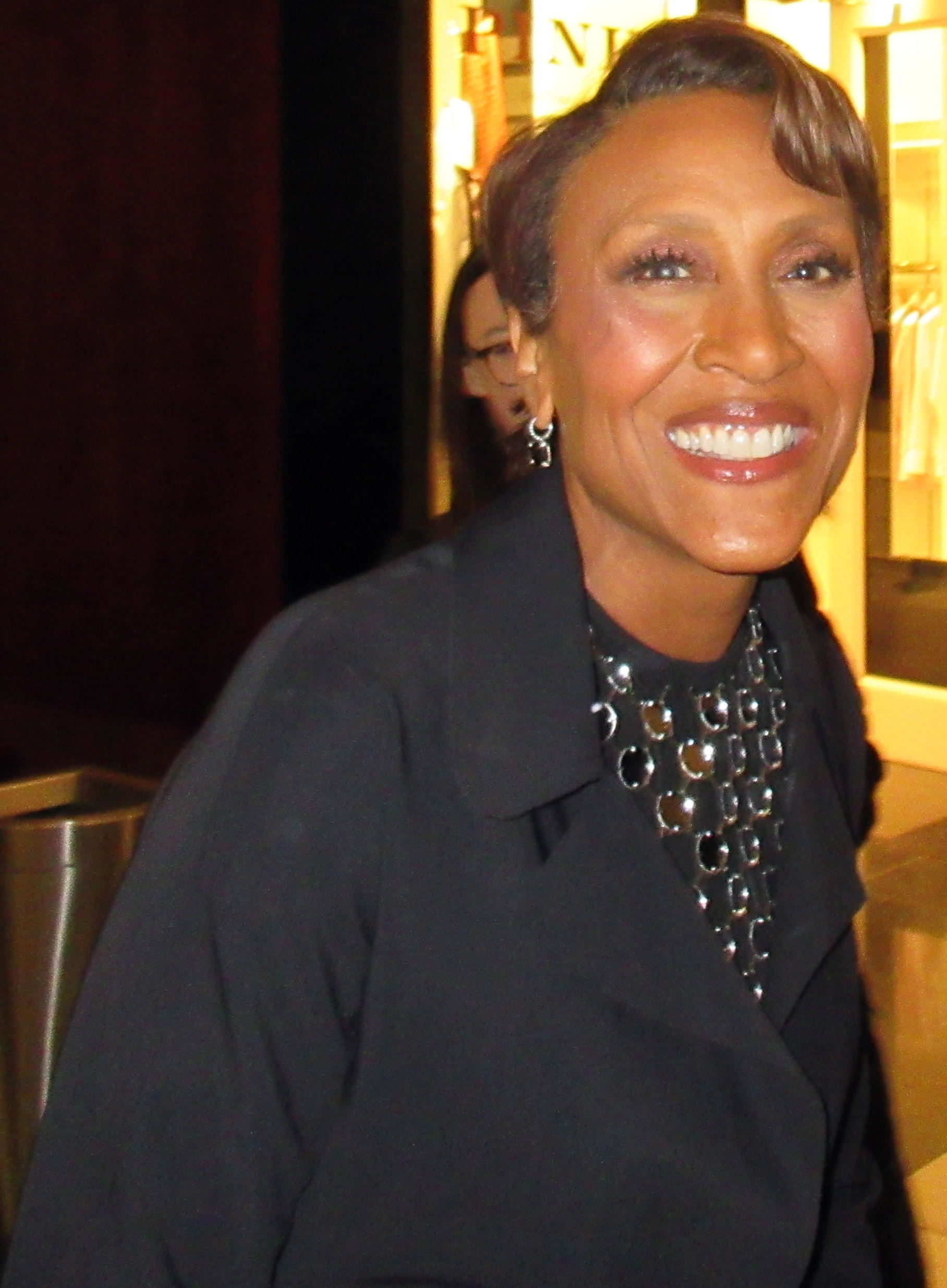
- Roberts in 2019
- Born: November 23, 1960 (age 65); Tuskegee, Alabama, U.S.
- Education: Southeastern Louisiana University
- Occupation: News anchor
- Years active: 1983–present
- Spouse: Amber Laign (m. 2023)
- Parent: Lawrence E. Roberts (father)
- Relatives: Sally-Ann Roberts (sister)

Robin Roberts (born November 23, 1960) is an American television broadcaster who co-anchors ABC's Good Morning America.

After growing up in Mississippi and attending Southeastern Louisiana University, Roberts was a sports anchor for local TV and radio stations. Roberts was a sportscaster on ESPN for 15 years (1990–2005) and the first woman to co-host NFL Primetime. She became co-anchor on Good Morning America in 2005. Roberts was inducted into the Women's Basketball Hall of Fame in 2012. Her treatment for myelodysplastic syndrome was chronicled on the program, which earned a 2012 Peabody Award for the coverage.

== Early life ==
Roberts, who is of African American heritage, was born in Tuskegee, Alabama, and grew up in Pass Christian, Mississippi, where she played basketball and tennis, among other sports. She attended Pass Christian High School and graduated as the class of 1979 salutatorian. She is the daughter of Lucimarian (née Tolliver) and Colonel Lawrence E. Roberts, who was a Tuskegee Airman.

In a 2006 presentation to the student body at Abilene Christian University, Roberts credited her parents with cultivating the "three 'D's: Discipline, Determination, and 'De Lord.'" She is the youngest of four, following siblings Sally-Ann, Lawrence Jr. (nicknamed Butch), and Dorothy.

== Education ==
Roberts attended Southeastern Louisiana University in Hammond, Louisiana, graduating cum laude in 1983 with a degree in communication. She followed in the footsteps of her older sister Sally-Ann Roberts, an anchor at the CBS affiliate WWL-TV in New Orleans.

Roberts noted on the January 14, 2007, edition of Costas on the Radio that she was offered a scholarship to play basketball at Louisiana State University, but thought the school was too big and impersonal after visiting the campus. On her way back to Pass Christian from that visit, she saw a road sign for Southeastern Louisiana University, stopped to visit and decided to enroll. The only scholarship left was a tennis scholarship, and she was promised that there would be a journalism scholarship by the time she would graduate. She went on to become a standout performer on the women's basketball team, ending her career as the school's third all-time leading scorer (1,446 points) and rebounder (1,034). Roberts is one of only three Lady Lions to score 1,000 career points and grab 1,000 career rebounds. During her senior season, she averaged a career-high 27.6 points per game. On February 5, 2011, Southeastern hosted a ceremony to retire Roberts' jersey, number 21.

== Broadcasting career ==
Roberts began her career in 1983 as a sports anchor and reporter for WDAM-TV in Hattiesburg, Mississippi. In 1984, she moved to WLOX-TV in Biloxi, Mississippi. In 1986, she was sports anchor and reporter for WSMV-TV in Nashville, Tennessee. From 1988 to 1990 she was a sports anchor and reporter at WAGA-TV in Atlanta, Georgia. While in Atlanta, she was also a radio host for radio station V-103.

=== ESPN and ABC News ===
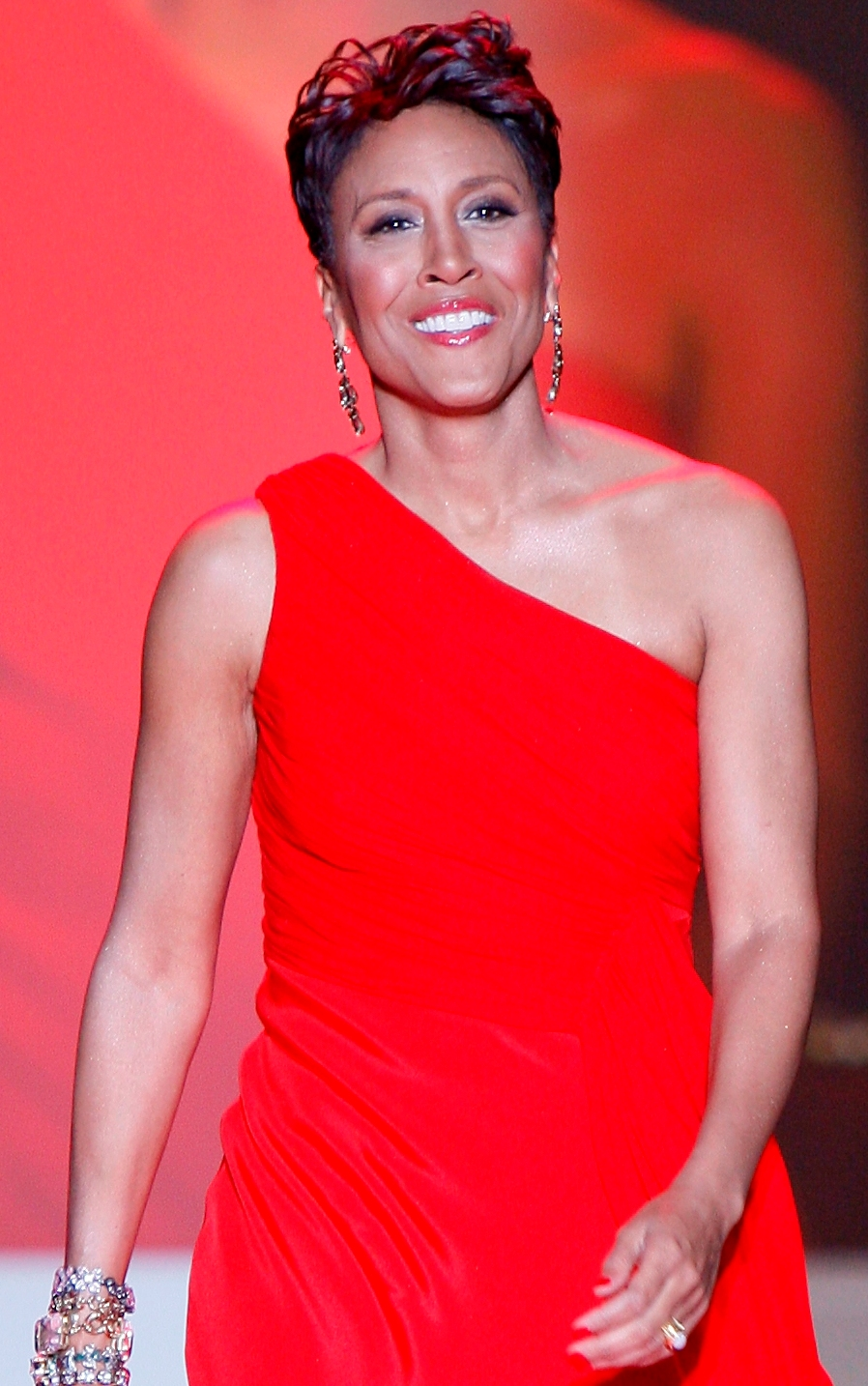
Roberts at The Heart Truth in 2010

She joined ESPN as a sportscaster in February 1990, where she stayed until 2005. On SportsCenter, she used the catchphrase, "Go on with your bad self!" Roberts began to work for ABC News, specifically as a featured reporter for Good Morning America in June 1995.

During this period, Roberts was also the host for ABC's Wide World of Sports from 1996 to 1998. In 1998 Roberts began co-hosting Good Morning America Sunday. Roberts worked at both ESPN and Good Morning America, contributing to both programs. During that time, she served primarily as the news anchor at GMA. In 2005, Roberts was promoted to co-anchor of Good Morning America. In December 2009, Roberts was joined by George Stephanopoulos as co-anchor of GMA after Diane Sawyer left to anchor ABC World News. Under their partnership, the Roberts-Stephanopoulos team led Good Morning America back to the top of the ratings; the program became the number-one morning show again in April 2012, beating NBC's Today, which had held the top spot for the previous 16 years.

In the fall of 2005, Roberts anchored a series of emotional reports from the Mississippi Gulf Coast after it was devastated by Hurricane Katrina; her hometown of Pass Christian was especially hard hit, with her old high school reduced to rubble. On February 22, 2009, Roberts hosted the Academy Awards preshow for ABC, and did so again in 2011.

In 2010, Roberts guest-starred on Disney Channel's Hannah Montana, appearing in season 4, episode 10, "Can You See the Real Me?" On May 30, 2010, Roberts drove the Pace Car for the 2010 Indianapolis 500.

Roberts guest-starred on Last Man Standing as Theresa in season 5 episode 17, "Tanks for the Memories" that originally aired on February 26, 2016.

Roberts was inducted into the Women's Basketball Hall of Fame as part of the Hall's class of 2012 for her contributions to and impact on the game of women's basketball through her broadcasting work and play. In 2014 Roberts was named one of ESPNW's Impact 25.

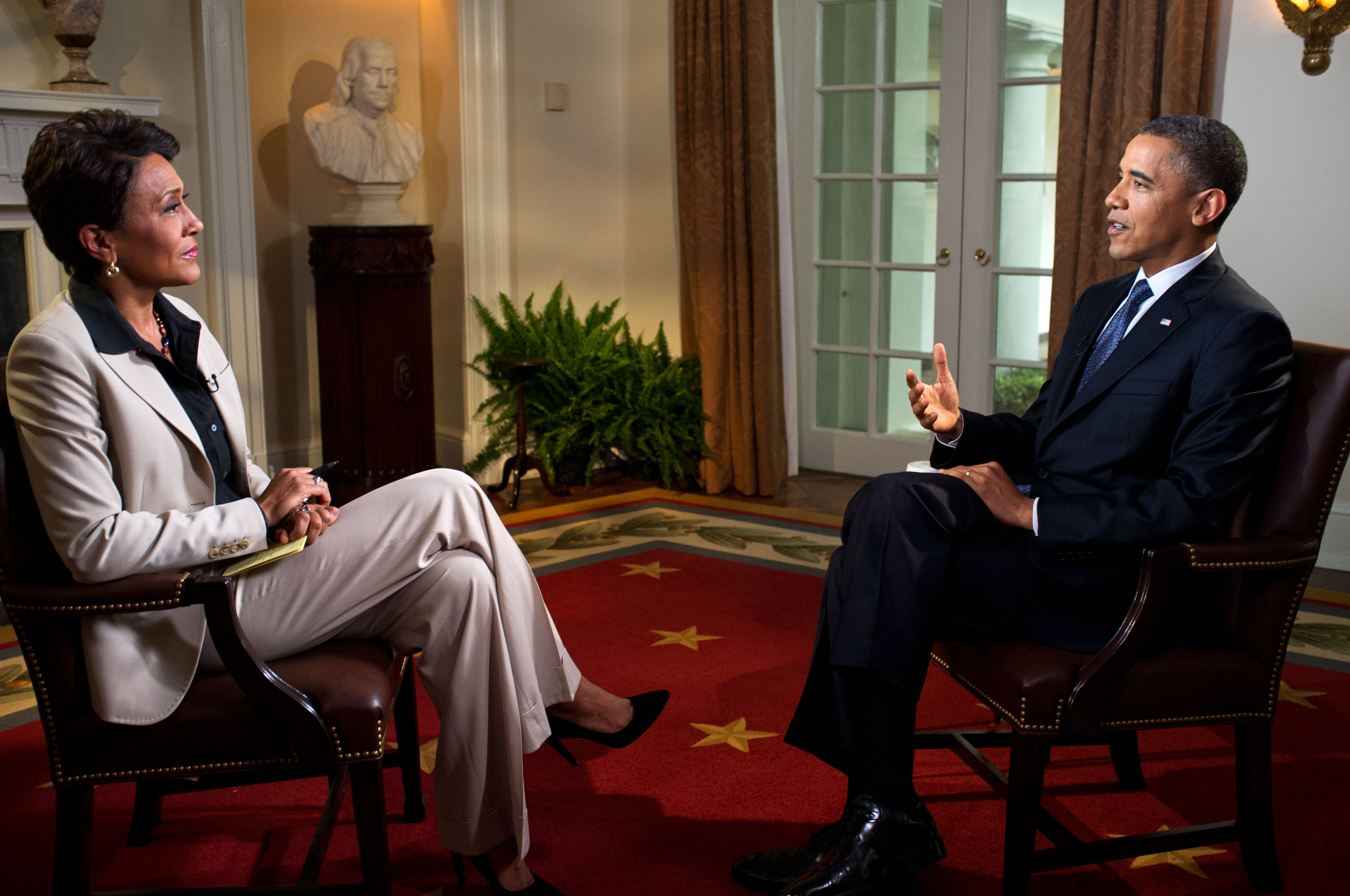
Roberts interviews President Barack Obama for Good Morning America in the Cabinet Room of the White House, May 9, 2012

On May 19, 2018, Roberts co-anchored the wedding of Prince Harry and Meghan Markle at St. George's Chapel in Windsor.

Roberts served as a guest host on Jeopardy! for five episodes airing July 19–23, 2021, following the death of Alex Trebek in November 2020.

Roberts is the host of the Disney+ interview series Turning the Tables with Robin Roberts, which debuted in 2021.

=== Other activities ===
She performed as an a cappella backup singer/former member of the Barden Bellas in Pitch Perfect 2.

In 2014, she started her own production company, Rock'n Robin Productions. Roberts, whose father was a Tuskegee Airman, executive-produced and narrated the one-hour documentary Tuskegee Airmen: Legacy of Courage which premiered on History on February 10, 2021.

== Awards and honors ==
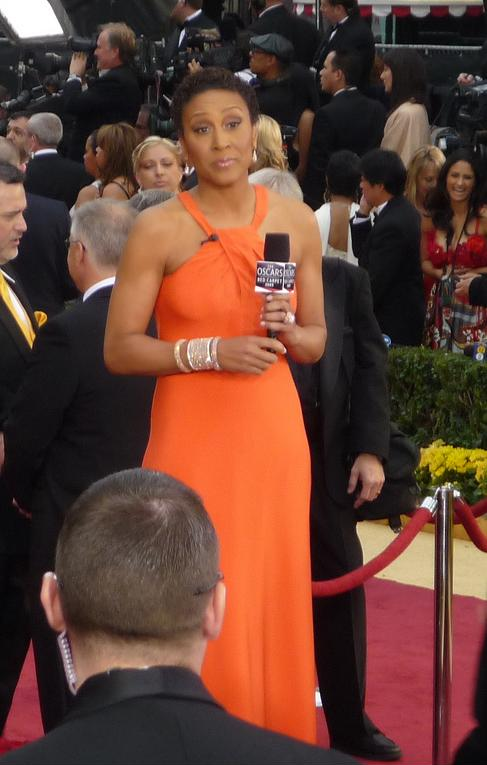
Roberts on the red carpet at the 81st Academy Awards in 2009

- 2001: Mel Greenberg Media Award, presented by the WBCA.
- 2004: Billie Jean King Contribution Award
- 2008: WNBA Inspiration Award
- 2012: Inductee, Women's Basketball Hall of Fame
- 2014: Walter Cronkite Award for Excellence in Journalism
- 2016: inductee, the Sports Broadcasting Hall of Fame
- 2015: honorary Harlem Globetrotter, the tenth person to be given this award
- 2018: Radio Television Digital News Foundation's Lifetime Achievement Award recipient
- 2018: National Association of Broadcasters Distinguished Service Award
- 2019: NBA Sager Strong Award
- 2019: For their first match of March 2019, the women of the United States women's national soccer team each wore a jersey with the name of a woman they were honoring on the back; Alyssa Naeher chose to honor Roberts.
- 2021: Inducted as an honorary member of Alpha Kappa Alpha.
- April 2022: Roberts celebrated her 20th anniversary with Good Morning America, during which an on-air celebration was held with Roberts being honored with a plaque featuring her name on the grounds of Time Square.
- 2023: Out100
- 2024: Poynter Medal for Lifetime Achievement in Journalism, presented by the Poynter Institute
- 2026: A star on Hollywood Walk of Fame

== Personal life ==
Roberts is Presbyterian and a practitioner of Transcendental Meditation.

Roberts began a romantic relationship with massage therapist Amber Laign in 2005. Though friends and co-workers had known about her same-sex relationships, Roberts publicly acknowledged her sexual orientation for the first time in late December 2013. In 2015, she was named by Equality Forum as one of their 31 Icons of the 2015 LGBT History Month. In September 2023, Roberts and Laign married.

On October 10, 2018, Roberts was selected as a mentor for Disney's #DreamBigPrincess campaign.

=== Health ===
In 2007, Roberts was diagnosed with an early form of breast cancer. She underwent surgery on August 3, and by January 2008 had completed eight chemotherapy treatments.

In 2012, she was diagnosed with myelodysplastic syndrome (MDS), a disease of the bone marrow. Be the Match Registry, a nonprofit organization run by the National Marrow Donor Program, experienced an 1,800 percent spike in donors the day Roberts went public with her illness. She took a leave from GMA to get a bone marrow transplant, and went home in October 2012. She returned to GMA on February 20, 2013. Roberts received a 2012 Peabody Award for how she engaged the public about her disease.

The Peabody citation credits her for "allowing her network to document and build a public service campaign around her battle with rare disease" and "inspir[ing] hundreds of potential bone marrow donors to register and heighten[ing] awareness of the need for even more donors." ESPN awarded its Arthur Ashe Courage Award to Roberts at the 2013 ESPYs, and the National Basketball Association awarded her the Sager Strong Award at its award ceremony on June 20, 2019.

== Books ==
- Roberts, Robin (2007). From the Heart: Seven Rules to Live By (1st ed.). New York: Hyperion Books. ISBN 978-1401303334.
- Roberts, Robin (2008). From the Heart: Eight Rules to Live By. New York: Hyperion Books. ISBN 978-1401309589.
- Roberts, Robin (2014). Everybody's Got Something. Grand Central Publishing. ISBN 978-1455578450.
- Roberts, Robin (2022). Brighter by the Day. Grand Central Publishing. ISBN 978-1538710166.

=== Audiobooks ===
- Roberts, Robin (2014). Everybody's Got Something Audiobook. Hachette Audio. ISBN 978-1478979630.

== See also ==
- Breakfast television
- Breast cancer awareness
- LGBT culture in New York City
- List of LGBT people from New York City
- New Yorkers in journalism
- NYC Pride March
