= Lawrie Mifflin =

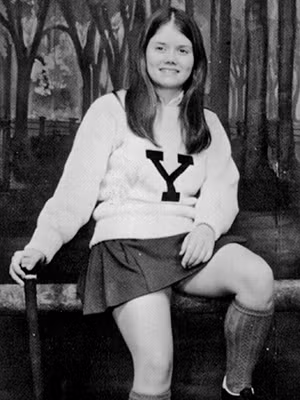
- Born: Swarthmore, Pennsylvania, U.S.
- Education: Yale University (1973)
- Alma mater: Columbia University (1974)
- Occupation: Journalist
- Employer: The Hechinger Report

Lawrie Mifflin is an American sports journalist.

== Education ==
Mifflin attended Yale University as part of the first co-educational class in 1969. She graduated in 1973 with a degree in history.

During her time at Yale, she pioneered women's sports journalism, including coverage of women's athletics at the university.

In 1974, she earned a Master's degree in journalism from the Columbia Graduate School of Journalism.

== Athletics career ==
Mifflin was a pioneer in women's athletics at Yale University. She co-founded the club field hockey program and advocated for organized women's varsity sports. Despite the absence of a proper practice field, equipment, coaches, or uniforms, her team ultimately secured varsity status for field hockey in 1972. During her senior year, she was elected co-captain of the newly established varsity team.

== Career ==
Mifflin was the first full-time female sportswriter for the New York Daily News, joining in 1976. She covered the NHL's New York Rangers and the NASL's New York Cosmos. Along with Robin Herman, she was among the first female journalists to be allowed access to the locker rooms. Mifflin reported on the 1976 Montreal Olympics. She wrote about media commentary on the body types and perceived femininity of female athletes.

From 1982 to 2013 she worked for The New York Times, where she held multiple roles, including sportswriter, Deputy Sports Editor, National Desk Editor, business reporter, Executive Director of TV Programming, and co-creator of the newspaper's web video development department. As part of The Times' Television Enterprises Department, she oversaw documentary content for the Discovery Times Channel and documentary productions for other TV outlets. She also covered three Summer Olympics and two FIFA World Cup tournaments.

Mifflin has been with The Hechinger Report since 2014, where she oversees higher education coverage.

In addition to her journalism career, Mifflin served as an adjunct professor at the CUNY Graduate School of Journalism.

She has also served as a volunteer coach and referee in American Youth Soccer Association leagues.

== Awards and accolades ==
- 1998: NCAA Silver Anniversary Award which honors former student-athletes for their collegiate and professional achievements.
- 2019: George H.W. Bush Lifetime of Leadership Award presented by Yale University to former student-athletes who have demonstrated outstanding leadership in governance, commerce, science and technology, education, public service, the arts, and media.

During her tenure at The New York Times, the publication won three Alfred I. duPont-Columbia Silver Batons, two documentary Emmy Awards, and a Pulitzer Prize for Public Service.

== Early life ==
Mifflin grew up in Swarthmore, Pennsylvania.
