= Nikki Franke =

American fencer

Personal information
- Born: March 31, 1951 (age 75) New York, New York, United States

Sport
- Country: United States
- Sport: Fencing
- Event: Foil
- College team: Brooklyn College
- Now coaching: Temple University

Nikki Franke (born March 31, 1951) is an American former fencer and fencing coach. She fenced for Brooklyn College, and was an All American. She competed in the women's individual and team foil events at the 1976 Summer Olympics, and fenced at the 1975 and 1979 Pan American Games, earning a silver medal in the individual competition in 1975, and a bronze medal in the team event in both years. As head coach of the Temple University women's fencing team, she was named the USFCA Coach of the Year in 1983, 1987, 1988, and 1991.

== Brooklyn College ==
Franke attended Brooklyn College, where she earned a B.S. with honors in 1972. She chose the college for its fencing, and fenced for it for four years, from 1968 to 1972. She was an All-American, and in her senior year she took third at the NIWFA collegiate championship. In 1979 she was inducted into the Brooklyn College Hall of Fame.

== Competition ==
She competed in the women's individual and team foil events at the 1976 Summer Olympics. Franke competed at the 1975 and 1979 Pan American Games, earning a silver medal in the individual competition in 1975 and a bronze medal in the team event in both years. She qualified for the 1980 U.S. Olympic team but did not compete due to the U.S. Olympic Committee's boycott of the 1980 Summer Olympics in Moscow, Russia. She was one of 461 athletes to receive a Congressional Gold Medal years later.

== Temple University ==
She is currently the head coach of the Temple University women's fencing team. Franke was named the USFCA Coach of the Year four times (in 1983, 1987, 1988, and 1991). Franke received a master's degree in Health Education from Temple in 1975 and completed the doctoral program in 1988. She recently retired as an associate professor in Temple University's Department of Public Health. In the 2017–2018 season. she reached a significant milestone with getting her 800th victory at Temple on February 4 at Northwestern. In her 46 years as the head coach of the woman's foil she compiled a record of 807–242–1. While leading the fencers to 46 postseason appearances that include 22 straight NIWFA championships titles.

== Black Women In Sport Foundation ==
She is one of the co-founders of the foundation along with Tina Sloan Green, Alpha Alexander, and Linda Greene. It's a non-profit foundation that is based in Philadelphia that encourages black women and girls to participate in all areas of sport such as coaching and the administration of it.

== See also ==
- List of USFA Hall of Fame members
