= Sally Roberts (wrestler) =

Wrestler and sports activist

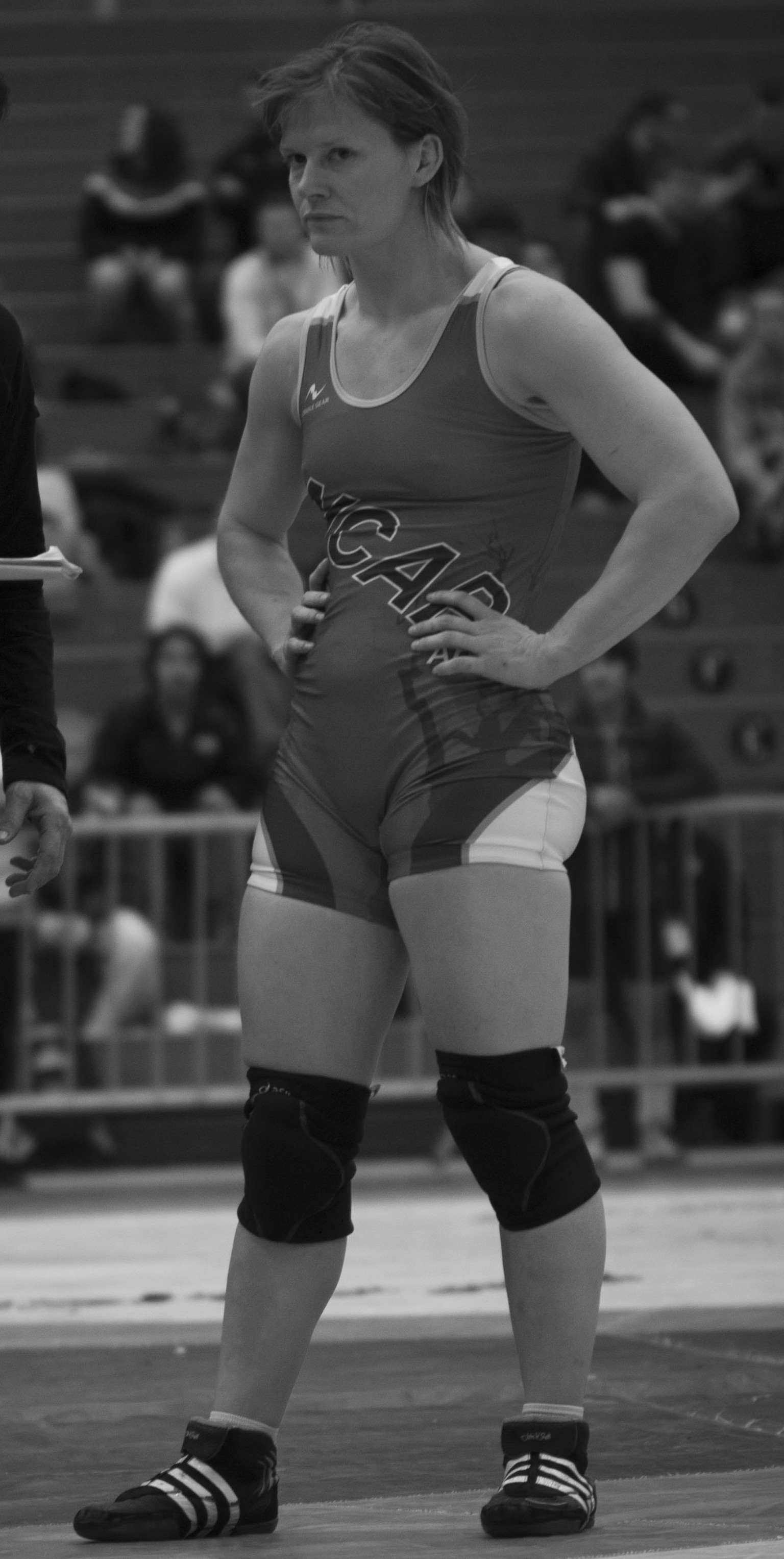
- Roberts in 2014

Personal information
- National team: United States
- Born: 1980 (age 45–46) Grants Pass, Oregon
- Height: 5 ft 6 in (168 cm)
- Weight: 132 lb (60 kg)

Sport
- Sport: Wrestling
- Club: Gator Wrestling Club; U.S. Army (2010-2016)
Medal record
Representing United States
World Wrestling Championships
Bronze medal – third place	2003	Freestyle
Bronze medal – third place	2005	Freestyle
U.S. National Championships
Gold medal – first place	2003	Freestyle
Bronze medal – third place	2004	Freestyle
Gold medal – first place	2005	Freestyle
Gold medal – first place	2006	Freestyle
Bronze medal – third place	2008	Freestyle

Sally Roberts is an American wrestler and activist. She is the founder of non-profit Wrestle Like a Girl.

== Early life and education ==
Roberts was the first in her family to graduate from high school. She went on to receive a Bachelor of Arts in psychology from the University of Colorado, Colorado Springs, as well as a Master of Arts in Sport and Performance Psychology from the University of the Rockies.

== Military service ==
Roberts joined the Army in 2009, and served with the 320th Psychological Operations Company. Roberts volunteered for a deployment to Afghanistan, and later joined the U.S. Army World Class Athlete Program.

== Wrestling ==
Roberts' wrestling career began in eighth grade, when she was given a choice between juvenile detention and an after-school activity. She earned her first gold medal at the Keystone Open in 1999, the same year she first placed in both U.S. National and World team trials. Roberts ultimately became a two-time World bronze medal winner and three-time U.S. National Champion.

== Activism ==
Roberts founded Wrestle Like a Girl, a non-profit that seeks to provide resources for female wrestlers. She advocates for NCAA recognition of female wrestling, which would provide access to benefits such as health insurance and scholarships currently available to male wrestlers only.
