= 2013 local electoral calendar =

Worldwide local elections held in 2013

This local electoral calendar for 2013 lists the subnational elections held in 2013. Referendums, recall and retention elections, and national by-elections (special elections) are also included.

== January ==
- 6 January: Thailand, Chonburi constituency 2, House of Representatives by-election
- 17 January: Bangladesh, Chittagong-12, House of the Nation by-election
- 20 January:
  - Bolivia, Beni, Governor special election
  - Germany, Lower Saxony, Parliament
- 21 January: Trinidad and Tobago, Tobago, House of Assembly
- 22 January:
  - Indonesia, South Sulawesi, Governor
  - Saint Kitts and Nevis, Nevis, Island Assembly
- 26 January: Singapore, Punggol East, Parliament by-election
- 27 January:
  - Germany, Leipzig, Lord Mayor (1st round)
  - Japan
    - Gifu, Governor
    - Yamagata, Governor
- 29 January:
  - Cook Islands, Tamarua, Parliament by-election
  - Indonesia, Papua, Governor
- 30 January: India, Assam, District Councils, Township Councils and Village Councils (1st phase)

== February ==
- 3 February:
  - Cuba, Provincial Assemblies
  - Ivory Coast, Bangolo, Bonon, Divo, Facobly, Issia and Koumassi, National Assembly by-elections
- 6 February: India, Assam, District Councils, Township Councils and Village Councils (2nd phase)
- 9 February: Thailand, Lopburi constituency 4, House of Representatives by-election
- 11 February: Uganda, Butaleja, Parliament by-election
- 12 February: India, Assam, District Councils, Township Councils and Village Councils (3rd phase)
- 14 February: India, Tripura, Legislative Assembly
- 17 February: Germany, Leipzig, Lord Mayor (2nd round)
- 23 February:
  - India
    - Meghalaya, Legislative Assembly
    - Nagaland, Legislative Assembly
  - Nigeria, Gombe, Local Government Councils and Chairmen
- 24 February: Indonesia, West Java, Governor
- 24–25 February: Italy
  - Lazio, Regional Council
  - Lombardy, Regional Council
  - Molise, Regional Council
- 26 February: United States, Wichita, City Council (1st round)
- 27 February: Solomon Islands, Nggela, Parliament by-election
- 28 February:
  - United Kingdom, Eastleigh, House of Commons by-election
  - Zambia, Mpongwe, National Assembly by-election

== March ==
- 3 March:
  - Austria
    - Carinthia, Parliament
    - Lower Austria, Parliament
  - Switzerland
    - Aargau, referendum
    - Appenzell Ausserrhoden, referendum
    - Basel-Landschaft, referendums
    - Basel-Stadt, referendum
    - Bern, referendum
    - Geneva, referendums
    - Grisons, referendums
    - Jura, referendum
    - Neuchâtel, referendum
    - Nidwalden, referendum
    - Obwalden, referendums
    - Schaffhausen, referendums
    - Schwyz, referendum
    - Solothurn, Executive Council (1st round) and Cantonal Council
    - Ticino, referendums
    - Valais, Council of State (1st round) and Grand Council
    - Zürich, referendums
  - Thailand, Bangkok, Governor
- 4 March: Kenya, Governors and County Assemblies
- 5 March:
  - Federated States of Micronesia, Chuuk, Governor (1st round), House of Representatives and Senate
  - United States
    - Los Angeles, Mayor and City Council (1st round)
    - Oklahoma City, City Council (1st round)
- 7 March:
  - India, Karnataka, City Corporations, Municipal Councils and Town Councils
  - Indonesia, North Sumatra, Governor
  - United Kingdom, Mid Ulster, House of Commons by-election
- 9 March:
  - Australia, Western Australian, Legislative Assembly and Legislative Council
  - Malta, Local Councils
- 14 March: Zambia, Livingstone, National Assembly by-election
- 16 March: Nigeria, Federal Capital Territory, Local Government Councils and Chairmen
- 17 March:
  - France, Oise's 2nd constituency and Wallis and Futuna's 1st constituency, National Assembly by-elections (1st round)
  - Japan, Chiba, Governor
  - Peru, Lima, Mayor and Metropolitan Municipal Council recall election
  - Switzerland, Valais, Council of State (2nd round)
- 22 March:
  - Antigua and Barbuda, Barbuda, Council
  - Turks and Caicos, Cheshire Hall and Richmond Hill, House of Assembly by-election
- 23 March: Nigeria, Bayelsa, Local Government Councils and Chairmen
- 24 March:
  - France, Oise's 2nd constituency and Wallis and Futuna's 1st constituency, National Assembly by-elections (2nd round)
  - Republic of Macedonia, Mayors and Municipal Councils (1st round)
- 27 March: Ireland, Meath East, Dáil by-election

== April ==
- 2 April:
  - Federated States of Micronesia, Chuuk, Governor (2nd round)
  - Greenland, Municipal Councils and Settlement Councils
  - United States
    - Anchorage, Assembly
    - Colorado Springs, City Council
    - Las Vegas, City Council (1st round)
    - Oklahoma City, City Council (2nd round)
    - Omaha, Mayor and City Council (1st round)
    - St. Louis, Mayor and Board of Aldermen
    - Wichita, City Council (2nd round)
    - Wisconsin, Superintendent of Public Instruction, Supreme Court and Court of Appeals
- 4 April: The Gambia, Area Councils and City Councils
- 6 April: Botswana, Letlhakeng West, National Assembly by-election
- 7 April:
  - France, Alsace, Single Territorial Collectivity referendum
  - India, Jharkhand, Municipal Corporations
  - Japan, Akita, Governor
  - Republic of Macedonia, Mayors and Municipal Councils (2nd round)
  - Northern Cyprus, North Nicosia Mayor and Municipal Council
- 9 April: United States, Illinois's 2nd congressional district, U.S. House of Representatives special election
- 14 April:
  - Ethiopia, City Councils, District Councils and Neighborhood Councils (1st phase)
  - Switzerland
    - Neuchâtel, Council of State (1st round) and Grand Council
    - Solothurn, Executive Council (2nd round) and referendum
- 17 April: India, Mizoram, Chakma Autonomous District, Council
- 20 April:
  - Iraq, Provincial Councils
  - Jordan, Amman's 2nd district, House of Representatives by-election
  - Nigeria, Edo, Local Government Councils and Chairmen
- 21 April:
  - Ethiopia, City Councils, District Councils and Neighborhood Councils (2nd phase)
  - Ivory Coast, Regional Councils, Mayors and Municipal Councils
  - Japan, Nagoya, Mayor
  - Paraguay, Governors and Departmental Councils
  - Poland, senatorial constituency No. 73, Senate by-election
  - Thailand
    - Chiang Mai constituency 3, House of Representatives by-election
    - Ranong, Senate by-election
- 21–22 April: Italy, Friuli-Venezia Giulia, Regional Council, Mayors and Municipal Councils (1st round)
- 23 April: Zambia, Kapiri Mposhi and Lukulu West, National Assembly by-election
- 24 April:
  - Germany, Bavaria, Abolish Tuition referendum
  - South Korea, Busan Yeongdo, Seoul Nowon 5 and South Chungcheong Buyeo–Cheongyang, National Assembly by-elections
- 28 April:
  - Austria, Tyrol, Parliament
  - India, Uttarakhand, Mayors, Municipal Corporations, Municipal Chairs, Municipal Councils, Town Chairs and Town Councils
    - Dehradun, Mayor and Municipal Corporation
    - Haridwar, Mayor and Municipal Corporation
  - Japan, Yamaguchi at-large district, House of Councillors by-election
  - Switzerland, Appenzell Innerrhoden, Landsgemeinde

== May ==
- 2 May: United Kingdom
  - South Shields, House of Commons by-election
  - England, County Councils, Unitary Authorities and Mayors
    - Buckinghamshire, County Council
    - Cambridgeshire, County Council
    - Cornwall, Council
    - Cumbria, County Council
    - Derbyshire, County Council
    - Devon, County Council
    - Dorset, County Council
    - Durham, County Council
    - East Sussex, County Council
    - Essex, County Council
    - Gloucestershire, County Council
    - Hampshire, County Council
    - Hertfordshire, County Council
    - Isle of Wight, Council
    - Isles of Scilly, Council
    - Kent, County Council
    - Lancashire, County Council
    - Leicestershire, County Council
    - Lincolnshire, County Council
    - Norfolk, County Council
    - North Yorkshire, County Council
    - Northamptonshire, County Council
    - Northumberland, County Council
    - Nottinghamshire, County Council
    - Oxfordshire, County Council
    - Shropshire, Council
    - Somerset, County Council
    - Staffordshire, County Council
    - Suffolk, County Council
    - Surrey, County Council
    - Warwickshire, County Council
    - West Sussex, County Council
    - Wiltshire, Council
    - Worcestershire, County Council
  - Wales, Isle of Anglesey, County Council
- 4 May: Nigeria, Kogi, Local Government Councils and Chairmen
- 5 May:
  - Armenia, Yerevan, City Council
  - Austria, Salzburg, Parliament
  - India, Karnataka, Legislative Assembly
  - Malaysia, Legislative Assemblies
  - Switzerland, Glarus, Landsgemeinde
- 5–6 May: Italy, Friuli-Venezia Giulia, Mayors and Municipal Councils (2nd round)
- 6 May: Australia, Tasmania, (Montgomery, Nelson and Pembroke) Legislative Council
- 7 May:
  - Liberia, Grand Bassa, Senatorial by-election
  - United States, South Carolina's 1st congressional district, U.S. House of Representatives special election
- 11 May:
  - Pakistan
    - Balochistan, Provincial Assembly
    - Khyber Pakhtunkhwa, Provincial Assembly
    - Punjab, Provincial Assembly
    - Sindh, Provincial Assembly
  - United States
    - Arlington, Mayor and City Council
    - Dallas, City Council (1st round)
    - El Paso, Mayor (1st round)
    - Fort Worth, Mayor and City Council (1st round)
    - San Antonio, Mayor and City Council (1st round)
- 13 May:
  - Canada, Labrador, House of Commons by-election
  - Indonesia, West Nusa Tenggara, Governor
  - Philippines, Governors, Provincial Councils, Mayors and Municipal Councils
    - Autonomous Region in Muslim Mindanao, Governor and Regional Assembly
- 14 May:
  - Canada, British Columbia, Legislative Assembly
  - United States, Omaha, Mayor and City Council (2nd round)
- 15 May: Indonesia, Bali, Governor
- 16 May:
  - India, Arunachal Pradesh, Municipal Councils, District Councils, Township Councils and Village Councils
  - Tonga, District Councillors and Municipal Councillors
- 19 May:
  - Croatia, County Prefects, County Councils, Mayors and Municipal Councils (1st round)
  - India, Punjab, District Councils and Township Councils
  - Pakistan, Karachi, National Assembly revote
  - Switzerland, Neuchâtel, Council of State (2nd round)
- 20 May: India, Assam, North Cachar Hills, Autonomous District Council
- 21 May: United States, Los Angeles, Mayor and City Council (2nd round)
- 23 May: Isle of Man, Douglas West, House of Keys by-election
- 25 May:
  - Bangladesh, Naogaon-5, House of the Nation by-election
  - France, First constituency for French residents overseas, National Assembly by-elections (1st round)
- 26 May:
  - Equatorial Guinea, Municipal Councils
  - France, Eighth constituency for French residents overseas, National Assembly by-elections (1st round)
  - Germany, Schleswig-Holstein, County Councils, Mayors and Municipal Councils
  - Indonesia, Central Java, Governor
  - Italy, Aosta Valley, Regional Council
- 26–27 May：Italy, Mayors and Municipal Councils (1st round)
  - Rome, Mayor and City Council (1st round)
- 27 May: Vanuatu, Tanna, Parliament by-election
- 28 May: Indonesia, Malang, Mayor

== June ==
- 1 June: Latvia, Municipal Councils
  - Riga, City Council
- 2 June:
  - Croatia, County Prefects, County Councils, Mayors and Municipal Councils (2nd round)
  - India
    - Banaskantha, Porbandar, Maharajganj and Howrah, House of the People by-elections
    - Haryana, Municipal Corporations and Municipal Councils
- 4 June: United States
  - Missouri's 8th congressional district, U.S. House of Representatives special election
  - Las Vegas, City Council (2nd round)
- 6 June:
  - Indonesia, South Sumatra, Governor
  - Uganda, Butebo, Parliament by-election
- 8 June: France, First constituency for French residents overseas, National Assembly by-elections (2nd round)
- 9 June:
  - France, Eighth constituency for French residents overseas, National Assembly by-elections (2nd round)
  - Switzerland
    - Aargau, referendum
    - Basel-Landschaft, referendums
    - Lucerne, referendum
    - Nidwalden, referendum
    - Obwalden, Referendum
    - Schaffhausen, Referendum
    - Solothurn, referendum
    - St. Gallen, referendum
    - Ticino, referendum
    - Uri, referendum
    - Vaud, referendums
    - Zug, referendum
    - Zürich, referendums
- 9–10 June: Italy
  - Mayors and Municipal Councils (2nd round)
    - Rome, Mayor and City Council (2nd round)
  - Sicily, Mayors and Municipal Councils (1st round)
- 11 June:
  - Indonesia, Maluku, Governor (1st round)
  - United States, Tulsa, Mayor (1st round)
- 14 June: Iran, City Councils and Village Councils
  - Tehran, City Council
- 15 June:
  - Bangladesh
    - Barisal, Mayor and City Corporation
    - Khulna, Mayor and City Corporation
    - Rajshahi, Mayor and City Corporation
    - Sylhet, Mayor and City Corporation
  - United States
    - Dallas, City Council (2nd round)
    - El Paso, Mayor (2nd round)
    - Fort Worth, City Council (2nd round)
    - San Antonio, City Council (2nd round)
- 16 June:
  - France, Lot-et-Garonne's 3rd constituency, National Assembly by-elections (1st round)
  - Japan, Shizuoka, Governor
  - Tanzania, Chambani, National Assembly by-election
  - Thailand, Bangkok constituency 12, House of Representatives by-election
- 20 June:
  - Iraq
    - Al Anbar, Provincial Council
    - Nineveh, Provincial Council
  - United Kingdom, Scotland, Aberdeen Donside, Scottish Parliament by-election
  - Zambia, Feira, National Assembly by-election
- 22 June: United States, Cherokee Nation, Tribal Council (1st round)
- 23 June:
  - France, Lot-et-Garonne's 3rd constituency, National Assembly by-elections (2nd round)
  - India, Mandi, House of the People by-election
  - Indonesia, Bandung, Mayor
  - Japan, Tokyo, Metropolitan Assembly
  - Northern Cyprus, Municipal Councils, Village Heads and Village Councils
- 23–24 June: Italy, Sicily, Mayors and Municipal Councils (2nd round)
- 25 June: United States, Massachusetts, U.S. Senate special election
- 28 June: Tuvalu, Nukufetau, Parliament by-election
- 29 June:
  - New Zealand, Ikaroa-Rāwhiti, Parliament by-election
  - Nigeria, Imo, Oguta, House of Assembly revote
- 30 June: Argentina, Misiones, House of Representatives and Private Prosecutors in Criminal Cases constitutional referendum

== July ==
- 1 July: Indonesia, North Maluku, Governor (1st round)
- 3 July:
  - Bangladesh, Kishoreganj-4, House of the Nation by-election
  - India, Punjab, Village Heads and Village Councils
- 4 July: Gibraltar, Parliament by-election
- 6 July: Bangladesh, Gazipur, Mayor and City Corporation
- 6 July – 9 August: Papua New Guinea, Local-Level Governments
- 7 July:
  - Mexico, State elections
    - Aguascalientes, Congress, Mayors and Municipal Councils
    - Baja California, Governor, Congress, Mayors and Municipal Councils
    - Chihuahua, Congress, Mayors, Trustees and Municipal Councils
    - Coahuila, Mayors and Municipal Councils
    - Durango, Congress, Mayors and Municipal Councils
    - Hidalgo, Congress
    - Oaxaca, Congress, Mayors and Municipal Councils
    - Puebla, Congress, Mayors and Municipal Councils
    - Quintana Roo, Congress, Mayors, Trustees and Municipal Councils
    - Sinaloa, Congress, Mayors and Municipal Councils
    - Tamaulipas, Congress, Mayors and Municipal Councils
    - Tlaxcala, Congress, Mayors and Municipal Councils
    - Veracruz, Congress, Mayors, Trustees and Municipal Councils
    - Zacatecas, Congress, Mayors and Municipal Councils
  - Ukraine, Sevastopol constituency 224, Parliament by-election
- 11 July: India, West Bengal, District Councils, Township Councils and Village Councils (1st phase)
- 15 July: India, West Bengal, District Councils, Township Councils and Village Councils (2nd phase)
- 17 July: Saint Helena, Ascension and Tristan da Cunha, Saint Helena, Legislative Council
- 19 July: India, West Bengal, District Councils, Township Councils and Village Councils (3rd phase)
- 21 July: Japan, Hyōgo, Governor
- 22 July: India, West Bengal, District Councils, Township Councils and Village Councils (4th phase)
- 23 July: India, Andhra Pradesh, Village Councils (1st phase)
- 25 July:
  - India, West Bengal, District Councils, Township Councils and Village Councils (5th phase)
  - Zambia, Chipata Central, Kafulafuta, Mkushi North and Solwezi East, National Assembly by-elections
- 27 July:
  - India, Andhra Pradesh, Village Councils (2nd phase)
  - Kenya, Makueni, Senate by-election
  - United States, Cherokee Nation, Tribal Council (2nd round)
- 29 July: Trinidad and Tobago, Chaguanas West, House of Representatives by-election
- 31 July:
  - India, Andhra Pradesh, Village Councils (3rd phase)
  - Zimbabwe, Urban Councils, District Councils and Ward Councils

== August ==
- 1 August: United Kingdom, Wales, Ynys Môn, Welsh Parliament by-election
- 5 August: Indonesia, East Nusa Tenggara, Governor
- 6 August: United States, King County, Executive and Council (1st round)
- 21 August: India, Mandya and Bangalore Rural, House of the People by-elections
- 22 August:
  - India, Ladakh, Kargil District, Ladakh Autonomous Hill Development Council
  - Pakistan, NA-1, NA-5, NA-13, NA-27, NA-48, NA-68, NA-71, NA-83, NA-103, NA-129, NA-177, NA-235, NA-237, NA-254 and NA-262, National Assembly by-elections
- 25 August: Japan, Yokohama, Mayor
- 27 August:
  - Jordan, Mayors and Municipal Councils
  - United States, Phoenix, City Council (1st round)
- 29 August: Indonesia, East Java, Governor
- 31 August: Indonesia, Tangerang, Mayor

== September ==
- 4 September: Indonesia, Riau, Governor (1st round)
- 5 September: Zambia, Mkaika, National Assembly by-election
- 8 September:
  - Japan, Ibaraki, Governor
  - Poland, senatorial constituency No. 55, Senate by-election
  - Russia, Federal Subject Heads, Federal Subject Legislatures, Municipal Heads, Municipal Councils, District Councils, Village Councils and Local referendums
    - Arkhangelsk Oblast, Assembly of Deputies
    - Bashkortostan, State Assembly
    - Buryatia, People's Khural
    - Chechnya, Parliament
    - Chukotka Autonomous Okrug, Governor
    - Irkutsk Oblast, Legislative Assembly
    - Ivanovo Oblast, Duma
    - Kalmykia, People's Khural
    - Kemerovo Oblast, Council of People's Deputies
    - Khabarovsk Krai, Governor
    - Khakassia, Head and Supreme Council
    - Leningrad Oblast, Legislative Assembly
    - Magadan Oblast, Governor
    - Moscow (City), Mayor special election
    - Moscow Oblast, Governor special election
    - Rostov Oblast, Legislative Assembly
    - Sakha, State Assembly
    - Smolensk Oblast, Duma
    - Ulyanovsk Oblast, Legislative Assembly
    - Vladimir Oblast, Governor and Legislative Assembly
    - Yaroslavl Oblast, Duma
    - Yekaterinburg, Head
    - Zabaykalsky Krai, Governor and Legislative Assembly
- 8–9 September: Norway, Sámi Parliament
- 10 September:
  - Indonesia, East Kalimantan, Governor
  - Tuvalu, Nui, Parliament by-election
  - United States, Colorado, Senate recall election
- 14 September: Indonesia, Bogor, Mayor
- 15 September:
  - Argentina, Corrientes, Governor, Chamber of Deputies and Senate
  - Germany, Bavaria, Parliament, Regional Assemblies and Debt Brake, EU Affairs, Municipality Funding, Promotion of Living and Working Conditions, and Promotion of Volunteer Work referendums
- 18 September:
  - Indonesia, Makassar, Mayor
  - Pakistan, NA-25, National Assembly by-election
- 19 September:
  - Cook Islands, Murienua, Parliament by-election
  - India, Odisha, Municipal Corporation, Municipal Councils and Notified Area Councils
- 21 September:
  - Iraq, Kurdistan Region, National Assembly
  - Sri Lanka, Central, North Western and Northern, Provincial Councils
- 22 September:
  - Germany
    - Hamburg, Energy Network referendum
    - Hanover, Lord Mayor (1st round)
    - Hesse, Parliament
  - Switzerland
    - Aargau, referendums
    - Basel-Landschaft, referendum
    - Basel-Stadt, referendums
    - Geneva, referendum
    - Grisons, referendum
    - Lucerne, referendums
    - Nidwalden, referendum
    - Obwalden, Referendum
    - Schaffhausen, Referendum
    - Solothurn, referendum
    - Ticino, referendums
    - Uri, referendums
    - Zug, referendums
    - Zürich, referendum
- 24 September:
  - Canada, Newfoundland and Labrador, Mayors and City Councils
  - United States, Boston, City Council (1st round)
- 28 September: Kuwait, Municipal Council
- 29 September: Portugal, Municipal Chambers, Municipal Assemblies and Parish Assemblies
- 30 September:
  - Cameroon, Mayors and Municipal Councils
  - India, Assam, Dibrugarh District, Sonowal Kachari Autonomous Council

== October ==
- 2 October: Indonesia, Lampung, Governor
- 3 October:
  - Bangladesh, Barguna-2, House of the Nation by-election
  - India, Assam, Dhemaji District, Mising Autonomous Council (1st phase)
- 5 October: Nigeria
  - Delta Central, Senate by-election
  - Ebonyi, Local Government Councils and Chairmen
- 6 October:
  - Germany, Hanover, Lord Mayor (2nd round)
  - Switzerland, Geneva, Council of State (1st round) and Grand Council
- 7 October: India, Assam, Dhemaji District, Mising Autonomous Council (2nd phase)
- 8 October:
  - Canada, Nova Scotia, House of Assembly
  - United States
    - Albuquerque, Mayor and City Council (1st round)
    - Raleigh, Mayor and City Council (1st round)
- 12 October: New Zealand, Regional Councils, Mayors, Territorial Authority Councils and District Health Boards
  - Auckland, Mayor, Council and Local Boards
  - Wellington, Mayor and Council
- 16 October: United States, New Jersey, U.S. Senate special election
- 17 October: Kenya, Kibwezi West and Matungulu, National Assembly by-elections
- 19 October: Australia
  - Christmas Island, Shire Council
  - Cocos (Keeling) Islands, Shire Council
  - Western Australia, Mayors, Regional Councils, City Councils and Shire Councils
- 20 October: Estonia, Municipal Councils
- 21 October:
  - Canada, Alberta, Mayors and Municipal Councils
    - Calgary, Mayor, City Council and School Trustees
    - Edmonton, Mayor, City Council and School Trustees
  - Trinidad and Tobago, Trinidad, Regional Councils and Municipal Councils
- 22 October: Israel, Municipal Heads, Municipal Councils, Local Heads and Local Councils (1st round)
- 24 October: United Kingdom, Scotland, Dunfermline, Scottish Parliament by-election
- 26 October: Nigeria, Kwara, Local Government Councils and Chairmen
- 27 October:
  - Argentina
    - Buenos Aires, Chamber of Deputies and Senate
    - Buenos Aires City, City Legislature
    - Catamarca, Chamber of Deputies and Senate
    - Chaco, Chamber of Deputies
    - Formosa, Chamber of Deputies
    - Jujuy, Provincial Legislature
    - La Rioja, Provincial Legislature
    - Mendoza, Chamber of Deputies and Senate
    - San Luis, Chamber of Deputies, Senate, Mayors and Municipal Councils
    - Santiago del Estero, Chamber of Deputies
  - Italy
    - South Tyrol, Provincial Council
    - Trentino, President and Provincial Council
  - Japan, Miyagi, Governor
  - Kazakhstan, Regional Councils and City Councils
- 27–28 October: Sudan, Abyei, Status referendum
- 28 October:
  - Canada, Nunavut, Legislative Assembly
  - Philippines
    - Ward Chairs and Ward Councils
    - Davao del Sur, Davao Occidental Creation referendum
- 30 October:
  - Indonesia, Padang, Mayor (1st round)
  - South Korea, Gyeonggi Gyeonggi and North Gyeongsang Pohang–Ulleung, National Assembly by-elections
- 31 October:
  - Indonesia, North Maluku, Governor (2nd round)
  - Saint Helena, Ascension and Tristan da Cunha, Ascension Island, Council
  - Uganda, Buhweju, Parliament by-election

== November ==
- 2 November: Nigeria, Enugu, Local Government Councils and Chairmen
- 3 November:
  - Canada, Quebec, Mayors and Municipal Councils
    - Montreal, Mayor and City Council
    - Quebec City, Mayor and City Council
  - Germany, Berlin, Energy referendum
  - Kosovo Mayors (1st round) and Municipal Councils
    - North Kosovo Mayors (1st round) and Municipal Councils
- 4 November: Trinidad and Tobago, St. Joseph, House of Representatives by-election
- 5 November:
  - Israel, Municipal Heads and Local Heads (2nd round)
  - United States, State and Local elections
    - New Jersey, Governor, General Assembly, Senate and Minimum Wage referendum
    - New York, Allow Casinos referendum
    - Pennsylvania, Supreme Court and Superior Court retention elections, and Superior Court
    - Virginia, Governor, Lieutenant Governor, Attorney General and House of Delegates
    - Washington, Court of Appeals and Genetically Modified Food Labels referendum
    - Atlanta, Mayor and City Council (1st round)
    - Aurora, CO, City Council
    - Boston, Mayor and City Council (2nd round)
    - Charlotte, Mayor and City Council
    - Cincinnati, Mayor and City Council
    - Cleveland, Mayor and City Council
    - Columbus, City Council
    - Detroit, Mayor and City Council
    - Houston, Mayor and City Council (1st round)
    - King County, Executive and Council (2nd round)
      - Seattle, Mayor and City Council
    - Miami, Mayor and City Commission (1st round)
    - Minneapolis, Mayor, City Council, Board of Estimate and Taxation and Park and Recreation Board
    - New York City, Mayor, Comptroller, Public Advocate, Borough Presidents and City Council
    - Phoenix, City Council (2nd round)
    - Pittsburgh, Mayor and City Council
    - Raleigh, City Council (2nd round)
    - San Francisco, Assessor-Recorder, City Attorney, Treasurer, Board of Supervisors and Referendums
    - Tucson, City Council
- 9 November:
  - Jordan, Amman's 1st district, House of Representatives by-election
  - Slovakia, Governors and Regional Councils
- 10 November:
  - Argentina, Salta, Chamber of Deputies and Senate
  - Japan, Hiroshima, Governor
  - Switzerland, Geneva, Council of State (2nd round)
- 11 November: India, Chhattisgarh, Legislative Assembly (1st phase)
- 12 November: United States, Tulsa, Mayor (2nd round)
- 13 November: India, Assam, Goalpara District and Kamrup District, Rabha Hasong Autonomous Council (1st phase)
- 16 November:
  - India, Assam, Goalpara District and Kamrup District, Rabha Hasong Autonomous Council (2nd phase)
  - Nigeria, Anambra, Governor
  - United States, Louisiana's 5th congressional district, U.S. House of Representatives special election
- 17 November:
  - Chile, Regional Councils
  - Kosovo, North Kosovo Mayors (1st round revote)
- 17–18 November, Italy, Basilicata, Regional Council
- 19 November:
  - Denmark, Regional Councils and Municipal Councils
  - India, Chhattisgarh, Legislative Assembly (2nd phase)
  - United States
    - Albuquerque, City Council (2nd round) and Abortion referendum
    - Miami, City Commission (2nd round)
    - San Diego, Mayor special election (1st round)
- 20 November: Mozambique, Mayors and Municipal Councils
- 22 November: Zambia, Mansa Central, National Assembly by-election
- 23 November: Mauritania, Municipal Councils (1st round)
- 24 November:
  - Honduras, Mayors and Municipal Councils
  - Peru, Lima, Mayor and Metropolitan Municipal Council special election
  - Switzerland
    - Aargau, referendum
    - Basel-Stadt, referendum
    - Bern, Bernese Jura, Grand Jura referendum
    - Jura, Grand Jura referendum
    - Lucerne, referendums
    - Neuchâtel, referendums
    - Schaffhausen, referendums
- 25 November:
  - Canada, Bourassa, Brandon—Souris, Provencher and Toronto Centre, House of Commons by-elections
  - India
    - Goalpara District and Kamrup District, Rabha Hasong Autonomous Council (3rd phase)
    - Madhya Pradesh, Legislative Assembly
    - Mizoram, Legislative Assembly
- 27 November: Indonesia, Riau, Governor (2nd round)
- 30 November: New Zealand, Christchurch East, Parliament by-election

== December ==
- 1 December:
  - Argentina, Santiago del Estero, Governor
  - India, Rajasthan, Legislative Assembly
  - Kosovo Mayors (2nd round)
    - North Kosovo Mayors (2nd round)
- 3 December: United States, Atlanta, City Council (2nd round)
- 4 December: India, Delhi, Legislative Assembly
- 7 December:
  - Mauritania, Municipal Councils (2nd round)
  - Pakistan, Balochistan, Metropolitan Corporations, Municipal Corporations, Municipal Committees, District Councils and Unions Councils (1st phase)
- 8 December: Venezuela, Mayors and Municipal Councils
- 10 December: United States, Massachusetts's 5th congressional district, U.S. House of Representatives special election
- 14 December:
  - Gabon, Departmental Councils and Municipal Councils
  - Indonesia, Maluku, Governor (2nd round)
  - United States, Houston, City Council (2nd round)
- 15 December:
  - Kosovo, North Kosovo Mayors (2nd round revote)
  - Ukraine, Kiev constituency 94, Mykolaiv constituency 132, Cherkasy constituency 194, Cherkasy constituency 197 and Kiev constituency 223, Parliament revotes
- 17 December: United States, Alabama's 1st congressional district, U.S. House of Representatives special election
- 19 December: Kenya
  - Bomachoge Borabu, National Assembly by-election
  - Bungoma, Senate by-election
- 24 December: Israel, Regional Heads and Regional Councils (2nd phase 1st round)
- 28 December: Nigeria, Yobe, Local Government Councils and Chairmen
- 30 December: Kenya, Nyaribari Chache, National Assembly by-election
