= List of elections in 2013 =

The following elections were occurred in the year 2013.

== Asia ==
- 2013 Armenian local elections 26 May, 17 November, and 8 December 2013
- 2013 Cypriot presidential election 17 and 24 February 2013
- 2013 Armenian presidential election 18 February 2013
- 2013 Bangladeshi presidential election 22 April 2013
- 2013 Iranian local elections 14 June 2013
- 2013 Iranian presidential election 14 June 2013
- 2013 Iraqi governorate elections 20 April 2013
- 2013 Israeli legislative election 22 January 2013
- 2013 Israeli municipal elections 22 October 2013
- 2013 Jordanian local elections 27 August 2013
- 2013 Kuwaiti general election 27 July 2013
- 2013 Liberian by-election 7 May 2013
- 2013 Maldivian presidential election 9 and 16 November 2013
- 2013 Mongolian presidential election 26 June 2013
- 2013 Nepalese Constituent Assembly election 19 November 2013
- 2013 Northern Cyprus parliamentary election 28 July 2013
- 2013 Jordanian parliamentary election 23 January 2013
- 2013 Pakistani by-elections 22 August 2013
- 2013 Pakistani general election 11 May 2013
- 2013 Pakistani presidential election 30 July 2013
- 2013 Cambodian general election 28 July 2013
- 2013 Macanese legislative election 15 September 2013
- 2013 Azerbaijani presidential election 9 October 2013
- 2013 Tajikistani presidential election 6 November 2013
- 2013 Turkmenistani parliamentary election 15 December 2013
- 2013 Bhutanese National Assembly election 31 May and 13 July 2013
- 2013 Bhutanese National Council election 23 April 2013
- 2013 Malaysian general election 5 May 2013
- 2013 Singaporean by-election 26 January 2013
- 2013 Japanese House of Councillors election 21 July 2013

=== Philippines ===
- 2013 Philippine general election 13 May 2013
- 2013 Philippine barangay elections 28 October 2013

== Africa ==
- 2013 Djiboutian parliamentary election 22 February 2013
- 2013 Ethiopian presidential election 7 October 2013
- 2013 Kenyan general election 4 March 2013
- 2013 Gambian local elections 4 April 2013
- 2013 Malagasy general election 25 October and 20 December 2013
- 2013 Guinean legislative election 28 September 2013
- 2013 Cameroonian parliamentary election 30 September 2013
- 2013 Zimbabwean general election 31 July 2013
- 2013 Malian parliamentary election 24 November and 15 December 2013
- 2013 Malian presidential election 28 July and 11 August 2013
- 2013 Mauritanian parliamentary election 23 November and 21 December 2013
- 2013 Togolese parliamentary election 25 July 2013
- 2013 Rwandan parliamentary election 16–18 September 2013
- 2013 Equatorial Guinean legislative election 26 May 2013
- 2013 Saint Helena general election 17 July 2013

== Europe ==
- 2013 Albanian local elections 1 September 2013 and 3 November 2013
- 2013 Monegasque general election 10 February 2013
- 2013 Papal conclave 12 March 2013
- 2013 Portuguese local elections 29 September 2013
- 2013 Austrian legislative election 29 September 2013
- 2013 German federal election 22 September 2013
- 2013 Bulgarian parliamentary election 12 May 2013
- 2013 Italian general election 24–25 February 2013
- 2013 Maltese general election 9 March 2013
- 2013 Macedonian local elections 24 March 2013 and 7 April 2013
- 2013 Estonian municipal elections 20 October 2013
- 2013 Latvian municipal elections 1 June 2013
- 2013 Norwegian parliamentary election 8–9 September 2013
- 2013 Liechtenstein parliamentary election 1 and 3 February 2013
- 2013 Armenian presidential election 18 February 2013
- 2013 Montenegrin presidential election 7 April 2013
- 2013 Icelandic parliamentary election 27 April 2013
- 2013 Serbian local elections 2013
- 2013 Italian presidential election 18-20 April 2013
- 2013 Italian local elections 26–27 May 2013
- 2013 Albanian parliamentary election 23 June 2013
- 2013 Luxembourg general election 20 October 2013
- 2013 Czech parliamentary election 26–27 October 2013
- 2013 Georgian presidential election 27 October 2013
- 2013 Portuguese local election 29 September 2013

== North America ==
=== Canada ===
- 2013 British Columbia general election 14 May 2013

=== United States ===
- 2013 United States elections
- 2013 Los Angeles mayoral election 5 March and 21 May 2013
- 2013 New York City mayoral election 5 November 2013

== Central and South America ==
- 2013 Argentine legislative election 27 October 2013
- 2013 Chilean general election 17 November and 15 December 2013
- 2013 Honduran general election 24 November 2013
- 2013 Falkland Islands general election 7 November 2013
- 2013 Falkland Islands sovereignty referendum 10–11 March 2013
- 2013 Paraguayan general election 21 April 2013
- 2013 Venezuelan presidential election 14 April 2013
- 2013 Venezuelan municipal elections 8 December 2013

== Oceania ==
=== Australia ===
==== Federal ====
- 2013 Australian federal election 7 September 2013

==== Northern Territory ====
- 2013 Wanguri by-election 16 February 2013

==== Victoria ====
- 2013 Lyndhurst state by-election 27 April 2013

==== Western Australia ====
- 2013 Western Australian state election 9 March 2013

=== New Zealand ===
- 2013 New Zealand local elections 12 October 2013
  - 2013 Auckland local elections 20 September to 12 October 2013
  - 2013 Christchurch mayoral election 12 October 2013
  - 2013 Dunedin mayoral election 12 October 2013
  - 2013 Hamilton mayoral election 12 October 2013
  - 2013 Wellington City mayoral election 12 October 2013
- 2013 Christchurch East by-election 30 November 2013
- 2013 New Zealand asset sales referendum 22 November to 13 December 2013

=== Nauru ===
- 2013 Nauruan parliamentary election 8 June 2013
- 2013 Nauruan presidential election 11 June 2013
