= 2017 Jordanian local elections =

- August 15, 2017

100 mayors 355 local councils 12 governorate councils
- Turnout: 31.7%

On 15 August 2017, Jordan held local elections for three levels of government: mayoralties, municipal and local councils, and governorate councils.

While the municipal and local councils have been elected consistently since 1925, the governorate council elections are the first of their kind in Jordan, with the councils established by a new 2014 decentralization law. The Law aims to reduce service-related pressure on the Parliament, so it can focus on its legislative and government oversight role.

6,623 Jordanians competed for 1,838 seats in the municipal and local councils, 303 in the governorate councils, and 100 posts for mayor. There are designated quotas for women in all posts.

== Timetable ==
Date	Event
12 February 2017	Cabinet decides to hold local elections
13 February 2017	Independent Election Commission sets date for elections on 15 August
12 March 2017	Dissolution of municipal and local councils
14 March 2017	Preliminary voters list issued
2 July 2017	Final voter lists issued
2 July 2017	Start of candidacy phase
5 July 2017	End of candidacy phase
14 July 2017	Last day for accepting or rejecting candidacies
31 July 2017	Final candidates list issued
15 August 2017	Elections day
17 August 2017	Final results issued

== Electoral system ==
Municipal and local council elections have been held consistently since 1925. These elections were the first to witness governorate councils which were added by a 2014 Decentralization Law. The Law intends to reduce the pressure of service and development related issues on the Parliament, so it can perform its legislative and oversight over government effectively. The law also intends to cede some central-government power to elected councils, increasing citizen participation in municipal decision-making. The Municipalities Law was also reformed around the same period. In a 15 August 2016 interview, King Abdullah II described the new decentralization law as "a very important link in the chain of reforms".

The Kingdom is divided into 100 municipalities: 82 municipalities with 355 local councils, and 18 municipalities with none (due to their small size). There are 1,838 members of the municipal and local councils. Mayors will be directly elected for each municipality. The municipalities, excluding the Aqaba Special Economic Zone Authority and the Petra Development and Tourism Region Authority, will be run by a municipal council that includes at least 7 members. The members of the municipal councils include the mayor and heads of the local councils (highest voted for members). Each local council consists of 5 members, including at least one woman. The Decentralization Law divided the Kingdom into 158 constituencies, which will witness the election of 12 governorate councils with 381 members. 85% of governorate councils members will be elected, and 15% appointed by the government. The elected 303 members of governorate councils, have a 10% quota for women (32 seats). A third of the appointed 45 members are required to be women (15 seats).

The Greater Amman Municipality (GAM), has a special law. Amman's mayor will be appointed by the cabinet from the 38-member municipal council (does not have a local council) which is 75% elected (22 members, one from each locality) and 25% appointed (10 members). There is a six-seat quota for the highest voted-for women.

Municipal and local councils are responsible for administering municipal services, while the governorate councils are tasked with monitoring and suggesting development projects, and formulating the municipality's budget. They also perform an oversight role over the local government, which is the executive council headed by a governor. Jordanians are required to be 25 years or older to be eligible for the elections.

The municipal and local councils were dissolved on 12 March 2017, and temporary committees were appointed to run municipalities until the elections on 15 August.

== Elections ==
The Independent Election Commission trained some 19,000 volunteers for an awareness campaign on the municipal and decentralization laws.

6,950 Jordanians have registered their candidacies for the elections by 6 July: 611 men and 6 women mayoral candidates, 3,772 men and 1,094 women for municipal and local councils membership, 1,195 men and 119 women for governorate council membership, and 140 men and 13 women for GAM's council.

After the end of the withdrawal period on 1 August, 327 candidates either withdrew or their candidacies were rejected by courts after appeals. The final candidates list includes 6,623 Jordanians: 538 mayoral candidates, 4,701 for municipal and local councils membership, 1,239 for governorate council membership, and 145 for GAM's council.

With the final candidates list issued, elections in 21 local councils were cancelled after its candidates won by acclamation. 68 women also won by acclamation.

Voters were given three ballot papers: blue papers for mayor posts where only one candidate can be selected; green papers for governorate council seats where one or two candidates (depending on what is located for each district) can be selected; and white papers for municipal and local councils where five candidates can be selected (including one female). Otherwise, the ballot paper will be considered null. GAM residents will vote on a green paper for governorate council seats where one or two candidates (depending on what is allocated for each district) can be selected; and on a white paper for the membership of the municipal council (GAM council) where only one candidate can be selected.

The elections were held on 15 August, starting at 7:00 am and lasting until 7:00 pm, while the Amman, Zarqa and Irbid areas' elections were extended to 9:00 pm. The elections went as planned with the exception of the central Badia, where a candidate's supporters attacked two ballot boxes. The turnout was 31.7%: Amman and Zarqa witnessed the lowest voting turnout in the country, while Jerash and Ajloun the greatest.

== See also ==
- Municipal council
- Local council
- Governorate council
