= IEC (disambiguation) =

IEC most commonly refers to the International Electrotechnical Commission.

IEC may also refer to:

== Businesses and organisations ==
- Independent Election Commission, the Jordanian electoral commission
- Electoral Commission of South Africa, formerly called the Independent Election Commission
- An independent ethics committee
- Institute of Catalan Studies (Institut d'Estudis Catalans)
- International Engineering Company, a Thai company
- Interstate Economic Committee, a Soviet committee
- Israel Electric Corporation
- Itumbiara Esporte Clube, a Brazilian football club

== Education ==
- Independent educational consultant

== In science and technology ==
- IEC connectors, electrical connectors
- IEC bus, for Commodore computers
- Inertial electrostatic confinement, in fusion energy
- Interactive evolutionary computation
- Ion exchange chromatography, a laboratory technique

== Other uses ==
- Island Eastern Corridor, an expressway in Hong Kong
- In Ear Monitors, used in broadcasting and concerts.
