= Local government in Jordan =

The local government in Jordan is represented by the governors and the executive council of the 12 governorates that are appointed by the central government. There are also 100 municipal councils represented by 355 local councils.
