= 2003 Jordanian local elections =

- 27 August 2003

100 mayors 970 members of local councils
- Turnout: 30%

Local elections were held in Jordan on 27 August 2003 to elect municipal and local councils.

== See also ==
- Municipal council
- Local council
