= Samar Haj Hassan =

Jordanian politician (born 1964)

- Born: 1964 (age 61–62)
- Title: Chairperson

Samar Haj Hassan (Arabic: سمر حاج حسن), (born in 1964) is a Jordanian politician and activist for women’s rights, a former member of the Jordanian Senate and commissioner in the Independent Election Commission (Jordan). She currently serves as the Chairperson of the Board of Trustees of the National Centre for Human Rights (Jordan) and was on the Royal Committee to Modernise the Political System, appointed as the President of the Women’s Empowerment sub-committee.

== Early life ==
Samar Haj Hassan was born in Amman, Jordan and studied International Business and Marketing in Switzerland.

== Career ==
Haj Hassan founded Mahara Professional Consultancies in Development, which provides services in the field of social and human development. She served in and advised several national committees and programs in the field of family affairs and was a member of the 25th Jordanian Senate.

In 2007, Haj Hassan bid for a seat in the Parliament of Jordan in the Amman governorate as an independent candidate.

In 2014, Haj Hassan was appointed as a member of the Independent Election Commission (Jordan). Haj Hassan was reappointed to the Independent Election Commission (Jordan) in 2016 and currently serves as the only woman in the commission.

In January 2021, Haj Hassan was appointed as member of the European Centre for Electoral Support's Strategic and Advisory Committee.

In October, 2022 A royal decree was issued appointing Haj Hassan as Chairperson of the Board of Trustees of the National Centre for Human Rights (NCHR).
