= President of the Council of Kumanovo Municipality =

President of the Council of Kumanovo Municipality Претседател на Совет на Општина Куманово Kryetar i Këshillit të Komunës së Kumanovës

Leadership
- President of Council: Aleksandar Arsikj, SDUM since 2016

Structure
- Council political groups: SDUM 12 Inc. Pres. VMRO-DPMNE 12; DUI 4 DPA 2 NDA 1 Indep. 2
- Length of term: 4 years

Meeting place
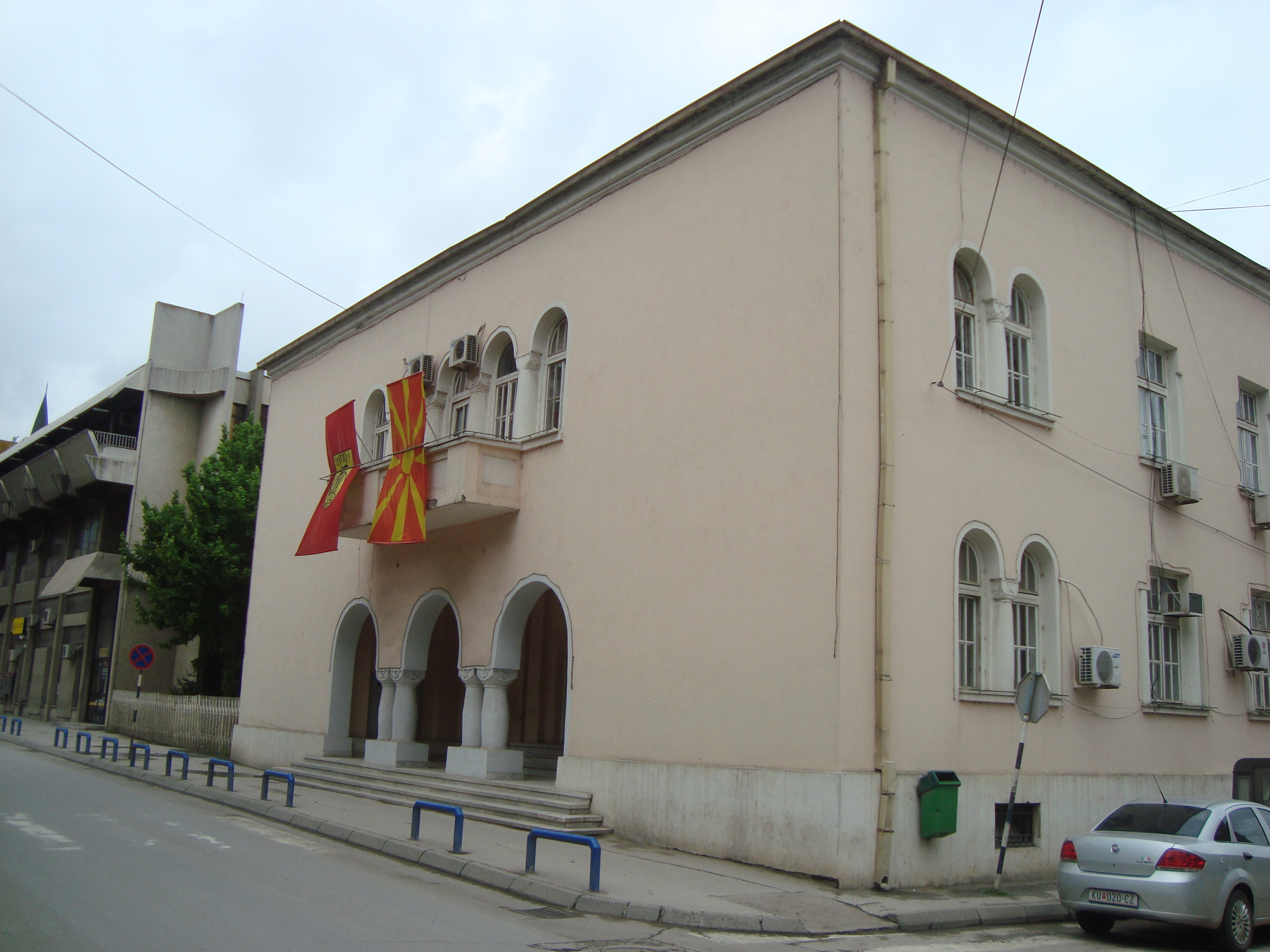
- Municipal building Kumanovo

Website
- kumanovo.gov.mk

President of the Council of Kumanovo Municipality (Macedonian: Претседател на Совет на Општина Куманово; Albanian: Kryetar i Këshillit të Komunës së Kumanovës) is the President of the Council of Kumanovo Municipality. Council has 33 members. The President and the Council work closely with the Mayor of Kumanovo.

== President ==
Current President of the Council is Aleksandar Arsikj.

- see also: List of presidents of Council of Kumanovo Municipality.

Obligations of the president of the Council: Convenes and manages the sessions of the Council, Takes care of the organization and work of the Council, It signs the regulations adopted by the Council and within three days from the date of their adoption, submit them to the Mayor for publication.

== See also ==
- Kumanovo Municipality
- Mayor of Kumanovo
