= Governorate council (Jordan) =

Elected local assembly in Jordan

Governorate council (Arabic: مجلس المحافظة Majlis Al-Muhafaza) is an elected local assembly in Jordan. The concept was founded by a 2015 decentralization law, and was first established in the 2017 local elections.

There are 12 governorate councils consisting of 381 members elected from 158 constituencies. 85% of the council seats are elected, while 15% are appointed by the central government. The council have no legislative authority and works only on development and services in their respective governorates to reduce the pressure on the parliament.

== Background ==
The 2015 decentralization law aims at establishing governorate councils to reduce pressure on the parliament, so that the latter can focus solely on its legislative and government oversight roles. The councils have no legislative authority and focus on development and services in their respective governorates. The Parliament also enacted the new municipality laws and shed the "one man one vote system" and introduced proportional representation. In a 15 August 2016 interview, King Abdullah II described the new decentralization law as "a very important link in the chain of reforms".

== Structure ==
In the governorate council's first meeting, the permanent committees are elected; development, economic, financial, tourism, water, energy, agriculture, health, education, public works and local community committees. The committees are made up of between four and seven members, for a two-year term. The councils are elected for a four-year term, and the power to dismantle the councils lies with the cabinet which can also call for new elections or postpone them. The decentralization law states that councils have administrative and financial independence. They are expected to endorse budgets, strategic plans, service and infrastructure projects. They work together with the executive council of the governorate, which is composed from representatives of the central government, such as the governors and directors.

There are 12 governorate councils that will be elected from 158 constituencies and the councils consists of 381 members; of which 336 are elected. The 336 members include a 32-seat quota for women. A third of the 45 members appointed by the government (15% of elected) are allocated for women, making the total number of seats for women 47.

Governorate	Constituencies	Seats	Women quota
Amman	32	53	5
Irbid	30	41	4
Balqa	12	23	2
Karak	10	24	2
Ma'an	9	16	2
Zarqa	13	30	3
Mafraq	18	35	4
Tafilah	7	15	2
Madaba	7	16	2
Ajloun	7	19	2
Jerash	7	17	2
Aqaba	6	15	2
Total	158	304	32

== 2017 election ==
In an 11 February 2017 meeting with the Independent Electoral Commission, the King stated his support to the Commission to carry the local elections. The Commission announced 15 August 2017 as the date for the election, after royal directives.

By 6 July 2017, 1,195 men and 119 women have registered with the Independent Electoral Commission to run for governorate council membership.

== See also ==
- Municipal council (Jordan)
- Local council (Jordan)
