= European Centre for Electoral Support =

Not-for-profit independent foundation

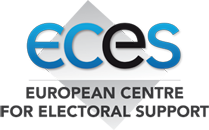
- Formation: 2010
- Legal status: Not-for-profit private foundation
- Purpose: Electoral and democratic support for the facilitation of the cooperation on electoral matters between the European Union, its member states and their partner countries
- Headquarters: 222 Avenue Louise, 1050, Brussels (Belgium)
- Executive director: Fabio Bargiacchi
- Key people: Monica Frassoni, president; José Manuel Pinto Teixeira, vice president; Jose Lambiza, treasurer; Members: Fabio Bargiacchi, Eva Palmans, Lino Francescon, Paulo Marques Strategic & Advisory Committee: Joelle Milquet, president; Filiberto Sebregondi, vice-president; Piero Scarpellini, secretary; Members: Erastus Mwencha, Samar Hajar, Didier de Jaeger.
- Website: www.eces.eu

The European Centre for Electoral Support (ECES) is a not-for-profit, private, non-partisan and independent foundation with its headquarters in the capital of Belgium, Brussels.

It was established at the end of 2010 via the initiative of Fabio Bargiacchi who co-opted Abbot Apollinaire Muholongu Malu Malu and of some other senior electoral and democracy support practitioners (including Monica Frassoni) to facilitate the European Union and its Member States in their electoral cooperation matters with their respective partner countries.

ECES operates globally, however, it has implemented projects and activities mainly in Africa and the Middle East, primarily with funding from the European Union and several EU Member states among which are Germany, Italy, France, Denmark, Ireland, Austria and Luxembourg.

Together with the United Nations Development Programme, International IDEA and the Organisation for the Security and Cooperation in Europe, ECES is today among the 4 most important implementing partners of electoral support funded by the European Union and its member states at global level.

ECES is TRACE and ISO 9001 certified for its financial and quality management systems respectively.

ECES is a member of the European Peacebuilding Liaison Office network, the largest European network of 48 independent member not for profit organisations from around 18 European countries working in the area of peace-building, democracy support and conflict prevention.

In 2023 ECES received two awards from the Association of African Electoral Authorities (composed of 45 countries) and the Electoral Commission Forum of the Southern African Development Community (ECF SADC – comprising 15 countries).

The first award was given to ECES's Founder and Executive Director, Fabio Bargiacchi, at the Continental Forum of the African Union held in November 2023 in Benin and delivered by the President of the Electoral Commission of Benin, Mr. Sacca Lafia, representing all the other 45 AAEA member states. The ECF-SADC award was presented to ECES by cardinal Stephen Brislin, Archbishop of Cape Town during the 25th Anniversary of Electoral Commissions Forum of SADC Countries established in 1998.

These two awards were given in recognition of ECES having been “a combatant alongside all the African EMBs to contribute to their democratic and electoral processes” and “to have provided all these years innovative capacity development programmes”

== History ==
ECES was ideated by Fabio Bargiacchi, a senior electoral expert with an extensive specific comparative experience, having served in various capacities within global development institutions, in the field of electoral assistance and election observation, including the European Union and the United Nations Development Programme. During his career and until 2010, he coordinated the "EC-UNDP Joint Task Force for the implementation of the partnership between the European Commission and UNDP on electoral assistance. Drawing from his experiences, together with Abbot Apollinaire Muholongu Malu Malu, they co-opted other electoral and democracy practitioners (including Monica Frassoni and others) to lead a process that birthed ECES.

Malu Malu served as the first president of ECES, from September 2010 until June 2013 when he was re-appointed chairperson of the Independent Electoral Commission of the Democratic Republic of Congo before his demise in 2016. In July 2013 Monica Frassoni became ECES' president, and Fabio Bargiacchi a member of the management board and executive director.

ECES commenced the implementation of relevant activities funded by the European Space Agency at the beginning of 2012, which included electoral coaching and learning activities delivered through a face-to-face and distance learning training for the 10 Electoral Management Bodies of the Economic Community of Central African States. Right after, a project in support of the elections in Libya in 2012 was implemented with the funding of the EU. ECES later implemented activities in more than 50 countries, with funding mainly from the European Union and its member states.

In September 2020, ECES established a strategic and advisory committee. This committee is led by its president, Joëlle Milquet, former Belgian deputy prime minister and vice-president, Filiberto Ceriani Sebregondi, former senior EU executive as well as former EU Ambassador in Togo, Tanzania and Ghana. Members of the committee include:

- Piero Scarpellini, executive adviser to the former president of Italian Ministers’ Council Romano Prodi in charge of relations with Member states of the African Union,
- Erastus J.O. Mwencha former vice chairman of the African Union and Secretary General of COMESA,
- Samar Haj Hassan, former member of the Independent Electoral Commission of Jordan and
- Didier de Jaeger also president of the board of Altavia.

== Strategy ==
ECES implements activities via its specific and copyrighted approach called European Response to the Electoral Cycle Support (EURECS). This tailored approach targets the delivery of electoral and democracy assistance activities, in consistency primarily with European values and EU policies. EURECS is implemented through methodologies and tools also copyrighted by ECES and namely the:

  - Leadership and Conflict Management Skills for Electoral Stakeholders (LEAD),
  - Electoral Political Economy Analyses (EPEA) Methodology,
  - Preventing election-related conflict and potential violence (PEV),
  - Standard Operating Procedures (SOP),
  - Communication and Visibility (C&V) Guidelines,
  - Electoral Security Threat Assessment (ESTA),
  - Leadership and Quality Management Skills for Electoral Administrators (LEAD-Q),
  - Innov-Elections distance learning,
  - Electoral Translator application,
  - Roster Database for Electoral Assistance Experts,
  - Peace Mediation for Electoral Processes methodology,
  - Media Monitoring and Early Warning to tackle hate speech, mitigate conflict and gender-based violence strategy,
  - Strategic Planning for Electoral Management Bodies,
  - Polling Station Allocation System (GIS) application,
  - Poll Workers Management System (PWMS) application,
  - Electoral Results Aggregator (for EMBs and CSOs) application,
  - Unified Social Media Monitoring and Early Warning System application
  - Voter List Digitalisation System application.

== Key activities ==
- Electoral advisory on every aspect of the electoral cycle
- Management of Basket Funds for the implementation of electoral support
- Political dialogue over electoral matters
- Electoral crisis mediation/process
- Confidence building/dialogue initiatives
- Support to religious networks, inter and intra faith dialogue
- Logistics and operational support
- Media monitoring and institutional communication
- Implementation of civic-voter education campaigns
- Hybrid approach to capacity development delivery through a flexible menu of distance training curricula,
- Procurement of electoral material:
- Development of innovative information and communication technologies (ICTs) solutions and applications
- Design and securitisation of ballot papers
- Transmission of election results
- Production of visibility plan

== Main projects ==
- PRO Electoral Integrity via the African Union
- Electoral Support in Chad
- Pro Observation Mali
- Innov-Elections
- Prevent, Mitigate and Manage Election-Related Conflict and Potential Violence in Ethiopia - PEV-Ethiopia
- European Response to Electoral Cycle Support in Ethiopia - EURECS Ethiopia
- EU Support to Democratic Governance in Nigeria -EU-SDGN
- EU Support to Jordanian Democratic Institutions and Development - EU-JDID
- Project in Support of Enhanced Sustainability and Electoral Integrity in Afghanistan - PROSES
- European Resources for Mediation Support - ERMES
- Election Observation and Democracy Support - EODS
- Prevent, Mitigate and Manage Election-Related Conflict and Potential Violence in South Africa - PEV-RSA
- Prevention and Management of Conflicts and Potential Violence related to Elections in Madagascar - PEV-Madagascar
- Prevention and Management of Conflicts and Potential Violence related to Elections in the SADC countries - PEV SADC
- Projet en Appui a la Crédibilité et Transparence en Burkina Faso - PACTE Burkina Faso
- Projet en Appui a la Crédibilité et Transparence en Guinee - PACTE Guinee
- Supporting Democracy in Libya - SUDEL
- Projet en Appui a la Crédibilité et Transparence aux iles Comores - PACTE Comores
- Project in support of a Peaceful and Inclusive Electoral Process in Zanzibar - PROPEL Zanzibar
- Initiative Citoyenne pour la Consolidation de la Paix, Leadership et Stabilité - INCIPALS Madagascar
- Projet d'Appui au Dialogue Démocratique au Gabon
- Support to Civil Society, Local Authorities and Human Rights in Ukraine
- Project in Support of the Electoral Process in Senegal - PAPE Senegal
- Support to the capacity development of the electoral commission in Sudan - SDP Sudan
- A Political Safari in Ghana, Madagascar, Conakry and Zanzibar using the movie An African Election

== Funding ==
ECES cooperates with several donor organisations to fund its activities, the most important of which are: the European Union, EU member states including Germany, France, Italy, Denmark, Austria, Luxembourg and Ireland. The EU funds have come from different financial instruments, including:

- European Development Fund - EDF
- European Neighbourhood Instrument - NEAR
- European Initiative to support Democracy and Human Rights - EIDHR
- Development Cooperation Instrument - DCI

In total ECES has received funds from more than 25 donors since 2010, including limited contributions from USAID, AUSaid and Canada. ECES since 2012 till the end of 2023 have mobilised funds for more than €130 million, mainly from the European Union and EU member states

== Collaborations and awards ==
ECES collaborates with global, regional organisations and electoral networks, such as the:

- African Union,
- ECOWAS,
- RECEF (the Electoral Knowledge Network of the French Speaking countries worldwide),
- Indian Ocean Commission,
- ECF-SADC (Electoral Commission Forum of the Southern African Development Community),
- ECONEC (Network of Electoral Commissions of the Economic Community of West African States),
- Electoral Knowledge Network of the Central African States (RESEAC),
- SADC Electoral Support Network that comprises the platforms of the Civil Society Organisations dealing with Election Observation in the SADC countries.
- A-WEB Association of World Election Bodies
- Organization of American States

ECES also partners with the Sant'Anna School of Advanced Studies of Pisa and the United Nations Institute for Training and Research through the delivery of the online "Master on Electoral Policy and Administration – MEPA".

ECES is part of a consortium led by the College of Europe to implement the ERMES project (European Response on Mediation Support) which provides a tool for the EU to advance its objectives and role in the field of mediation and dialogue.

ECES is a member of the Federation of European and International Association established in Belgium (FAIB) and is part of the EU Transparency Register and the Transnational Giving Europe Network.

In 2018, ECES was invited at pre-workshop of the American Association of Political Science (APSA) titled New Challenges in Electoral Management, Building Better Elections. The workshop was organised in Boston at the Massachusetts Institute of Technology (MIT) by the Electoral Management Network, the Electoral Integrity Project and the MIT Election Data and Science Lab. ECES' presentation focused on the topic Mitigating Electoral Violence. On the occasion of its Preventing and Mitigating Electoral Violence in the Southern Africa Development Community which was funded by the European Union, ECES launched the handbook “Preventing and mitigating electoral conflict and violence: lessons from the Southern Africa” .

In November 2020, at the Paris Peace Forum, ECES was selected as one of the best 10 projects among over 850 projects for its "European Response to Electoral Cycle Support" approach also implemented in Ethiopia with an angle to prevent and mitigate electoral conflicts and violence. With this selection, ECES received a 12-month customised support from the Paris Peace Forum, through monthly workshops and targeted advice from two senior mentors (Stefano Manservisi and Jean Marie Guéhenno).

In May 2021, Bankole Adeoye, the new Commissioner for Political Affairs and Peace and Security of the African Union, signed with the executive director of ECES a Memorandum of Understanding (MoU) for the collaboration in the areas of Electoral Integrity, Prevention of Electoral Conflicts, Human Rights and Women Political Participation.

In 2023 ECES received two awards from the Association of African Electoral Authorities and the Electoral Commission Forum of the Southern African Development Community SADC.

The first award was given to ECES's Founder and Executive Director, Fabio Bargiacchi, at the Continental Forum of the African Union held in November 2023 in Benin and delivered by the President of the Electoral Commission of Benin, Mr. Sacca Lafia, representing all the other AAEA member states.

The ECF-SADC award was presented to ECES by H.E. Cardinal Mgr. Stephen Brislin who is Archbishop of Cape Town, during the 25th Anniversary of Electoral Commissions Forum of SADC Countries that was established in 1998.

These two awards were given in recognition of ECES having been “a combatant alongside all the African EMBs to contribute to their democratic and electoral processes” and “to have provided all these years innovative capacity development programmes”

== Publications ==
ECES via its members or other Experts working for the foundation have authored, co-authored or contributed to specialised publications in the field of electoral and democracy support such as:

- Strategic Planning using Quality Management Principle
- Media Monitoring, Hate Speech and Gender based violence
- SDG 16: An enabler for accelerated implementation of the 2030 Agenda
- Challenges and Opportunities of Implementing E-Voting in Nigeria: the cases of Indonesia, Brasil, India and Namibia (2021)
- Innov-Elections - Delivering Electoral and Democracy Support under COVID-19: ECES Preparedness and Responses (2020)
- Reflections on Election Conflict and Violence Prevention: Lessons from Southern Africa (2018)
- Preventing and Mitigating Electoral Conflict and Violence - Handbook (2018)
- The potential of EU Funded electoral assistance to support the prevention of election related conflict and violence: Lessons from the Southern African Region (2017)
- A European Response to Electoral Cycle Approach - EURECS (2016)
- Using International Standards. Council of Europe Handbook for Domestic Election Observers (2013)
- Biometrics in Elections: Issues and Perspectives, European Centre for Electoral Support, Organisation Internationale de la Francophonie (OIF) and National Autonomous and Permanent Electoral Commission of Gabon (2013)
- Missing a Trick? Building Bridges between EU Mediation and EU Electoral Support in Conflict-affected Countries, Antje Herrberg, Fabio Bargiacchi and Raphaël Pouyé, MediatEUr (2012)
- Essential Consideration of Electronic Voting published by International IDEA (2011)
- ISPI Working Paper on the Electoral Cycle Approach: Effectiveness and Sustainability of Electoral Assistance (2011)
- EU and Peace building, Policy and Legal Aspects: EU Electoral Support (2010)
- EC-UNDP Operational Paper on Procurement Aspects of Introducing ICTs in Electoral Processes: the specific case of biometric voter registration (2010)
- EC-UNDP Operational Guidelines. Implementation of Electoral Assistance Programmes and Projects (2006 and 2008)
- ACE Focus on Effective Electoral Assistance (2007)
- UNDP Electoral Assistance Implementation Guide (2007)
- EC Methodological Guide on Electoral Assistance (2006)
