= 2013 Jordanian local elections =

- 27 August 2013

100 mayors 970 members of local councils
- Turnout: 30%

Local elections were held in Jordan on 27 August 2013 to elect held municipal and local councils.

== See also ==
- Municipal council
- Local council
