= Centar Municipality =

Centar Municipality may refer to:

- Centar Municipality, Sarajevo
- Centar Municipality, Skopje
