= Monica Frassoni =

Italian politician (born 1963)

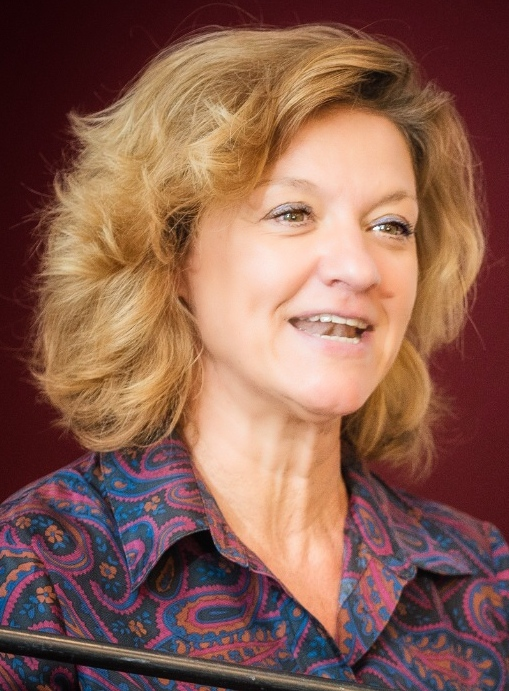
- Frassoni in 2019

Spokesperson for the European Green Party
- In office 21 October 2009 – 5 November 2019 Serving with Reinhard Bütikofer

Member of the European Parliament
- In office 20 July 1999 – 14 July 2009

Co-President of the European Centre for Electoral Support
- Incumbent
- Assumed office 10 June 2013

Personal details
- Born: 10 September 1963 (age 63) Veracruz, Mexico
- Party: European Green Party
- Website: monicafrassoni.org

Monica Frassoni (born 10 September 1963) is an Italian politician who served as a Member of the European Parliament from 1999 to 2009 and as co-chair of the European Green Party from 2009 to 2019. In 2018, she was elected at the local Council of Ixelles in the Brussels Region, representing the Ecolo party.

In 2010, Frassoni co-founded and leads the European Alliance to Save Energy a multi-stakeholder, business-led organisation which aims to promote and advocate energy savings and a new energy model. She is also a member of the steering committee of the Coalition of Energy Savings.

Since 2013, Frassoni has served as President of the Management Board of the European Centre for Electoral Support (ECES), a leading international non-profit organisation specialising in electoral and democracy assistance. ECES implements projects worldwide, primarily funded by the European Union and its Member States, providing advisory services, operational support, capacity and leadership development, and peer-to-peer exchanges, while contributing to the prevention and mitigation of electoral conflicts.

Frassoni is a member of the board of trustees of "Friends of Europe" a leading think tank that works to promote a more inclusive, sustainable and forward-looking Europe. She is also a board member of the Foundation ceci n'est pas une crise, created in 2013 in Belgium to respond to the challenges of cultural and identity populism.

== Early life and education ==
Frassoni is a Political Science graduate from the University of Florence Cesare Alfieri.

== Early career ==
From 1983, Frassoni became actively involved in the European Federalist Movement. In 1987, she moved to Brussels, having been elected as Secretary General of the European organisation of Young European Federalists (“JEF Europe”). She was appointed president of the European Co-Coordinating Bureau of Youth NGOs, a position she held from 1991 to 1993.

In 1990, Frassoni started working for the Greens/EFA Group in the European Parliament in charge of constitutional matters, rule of law, procedures and immunities. In that capacity, she worked closely with Adelaide Aglietta, Alexander Langer and Paul Lannoye and was heavily involved in the implementation of the European Parliament's new legislative competences, subsequent to the institutional reforms culminating in the Treaties of Maastricht, Amsterdam and Nice.

== Political career ==
=== Member of the European Parliament, 1999–2009 ===
In 1999, Frassoni was elected as a member of the European Parliament for her first mandate with Ecolo, becoming the first non-Belgian politician to be elected in a Belgian political party and the first Italian national to be elected abroad. During her first legislation, she was active in constitutional affairs and human rights issues, closely following the negotiations for enlarging the EU to include Cyprus and for reform of the EU. She also became involved in several specific environmental issues with a clear European dimension in terms of EU law, such as protection of the Ebro River in Spain, high-speed infrastructures like the Lyon-Turin tunnel, waste in Naples, etc.

From 2002 to 2009, Frassoni served as co-chair (alongside Daniel Cohn-Bendit) of the Green/EFA group which by then had grown into the third largest group in the European Parliament in terms of number of MEPs.

In June 2004, Frassoni was re-elected for a second term, this time with the Italian Federation of the Greens. During the 2004–2019 legislative period, she was a member of the Committee on Legal Affairs and a substitute member of both the Committee on Constitutional Affairs and the Committee on the Environment, Public Health and Food Safety. For three years, she was also rapporteur on the yearly report of the European Parliament on the implementation of the EU law, thus following closely the review of infringement procedures carried out by the European Commission. She was also a member of the European Parliament negotiating team in the working group on the reform of the Parliament, led by Dagmar Roth-Behrendt, and on the Interinstitutional Agreement on Better Law-making.

In addition to her committee assignments, Frassoni was part of the delegations for relations with Mercosur, Iran, and the Parliamentary Assembly of the Mediterranean.

In her capacity as parliamentarian, Frassoni was appointed by European Commissioner on External Relations and European Neighbourhood Policy, Benita Ferrero-Waldner, as chief of the European Union Election observation missions to the 2006 Bolivian Constitutional Assembly election and to the 2006 Venezuelan presidential election.

In 2007, Frassoni was her group's candidate for the presidency of the European Parliament, standing against Hans-Gert Pöttering. She secured about three times the number of voters of her own group.

From 2003, Frassoni was a member of the executive and later Vice-Chair of the Parliamentary Network on the World Bank and International Monetary Fund.

=== President of ECES from 2013 ===
In 2009, following the end of her second mandate in the European Parliament, Frassoni was elected a co-chair of the European Green Party, being re-elected in 2012 and 2015. She concluded her mandate in November 2019.

In 2013, she was heavily involved in the organisation of the first pan-European Green Primary campaign for the nomination of the Green candidate for the position of President of the European Commission. This campaign was an innovative pilot project involving national Green parties which aimed at bringing the discussion on who leads the EU closer to the citizens and at "Europeanising" the elections for the European Parliament in 2014.

In 2010, Frassoni co-funded and was appointed President of the European Alliance to Save Energy, a multistakeholder, business-led advocacy organisation aiming at promoting strong and ambitious EU-wide regulation on energy and at thus strengthening policies for the decarbonisation of EU-economy.

In 2011, she joined the board of the European Centre for Electoral Support, and in 2013, became president of the board, replacing the late ex-president and founder Abbot Apollinaire Malou Malou. ECES is an independent, non-partisan, not-for-profit foundation headquartered in Brussels, with operations worldwide. It was established at the end of 2010 on the initiative of Fabio Bargiacchi, who has served as its Executive Director since founding. ECES has carried out activities in more than 70 countries, primarily in Africa and the Middle East, largely funded by the European Union and its member states.

The organization developed "A European Response to Electoral Cycle Support" (EURECS), a copyrighted strategic framework for electoral and democracy assistance. EURECS is complemented by a portfolio of proprietary methodologies and operational tools developed by ECES, comprising a total of 22 copyrights. The framework is designed to align electoral assistance with European values and EU policies and to foster cooperation on electoral matters between the European Union, its Member States and partner countries.

ECES is also certified under ISO 9001 for quality management and by TRACE International for anti-bribery compliance and transparency. ECES has also participated in EU peacebuilding and mediation work, including hosting the European Resource for Mediation Support (ERMES) project at its Brussels headquarters on behalf of the EU. It is a member of the European Peacebuilding Liaison Office (EPLO) and the Team Europe Democracy (TED) Initiative.

In 2018 and 2019, she was appointed Special Ambassador of the EU Sustainable Energy Week.

Central to her current political work is the goad of a "Federal Union", to be supported by a radical reorientation of EU policies and investment priorities towards a real "Green New Deal", the elimination of the powers to veto for each EU Member State; a more robust role for the European Parliament, to be elected partly through transnational electoral list, and a more substantial EU budget. "A deeply reformed EU can have the right dimensions and capacity to face today's global challenges, in particular the fight against climate change, inequality, intolerance and the progressive weakening of democracy and freedoms in the EU. Her work in the energy and electoral assistance areas are closely linked to this idea of promoting and strengthening European democracy".

=== Career in local politics ===
In the 2018 Belgian local elections, Frassoni was voted local councilor for the Ecolo-Groen list in Ixelles (Brussels), under the mayorship of Christos Doulkeridis (Ecolo).

== Other activities ==
Frassoni is a regular speaker and lecturer in academic fora and public events, focusing on sustainable energy and energy savings, green transformation of the global economy and society to fight exclusion and climate change, democracy and participation of civil society, notably women and youth, in decision-making at all levels.

In 2018 she delivered a series of lectures on EU institutions and environmental law at Deusto University, Bilbao, Spain.

In 2019 she delivered a special Course on “Lobbies and groups of interest in the EU” at the Sant’Anna School of Advanced Studies, Pisa, Italy.

== Articles and publications ==
In 2010, she contributed to the book "Europa 2.0 Prospettive ed evoluzioni del sogno europeo", edited by Nicola Vallinoto and Simone Vannuccini, with a chapter on conditions for the relaunch of Europe's constitutional process.

In 2012, she contributed to the book "Un'altra donna è possibile. Voci fuori dal coro nell'Italia del bunga bunga", edited by Paola Castiglia.

In 2014, she contributed to the book "Un'altra Europa. Sostenibile, democratica, paritaria, solidale", edited by Silvia Zamboni, with a chapter on the challenges of climate change and energy policy.

In 2016, she contributed to the book "Accountability, Transparency and Democracy in the Functioning of Bretton Woods Institutions", edited by Prof. Elena Sciso, with the chapter "Two concrete experiences".

In 2017, she contributed to the book " Mecanismos de participación ciudadana, una experiencia global" edited by Lic. Gema Morales Martinez and Gerardo Romeo Altamirano, with a chapter on the experiences of direct democracy in Italy and the EU.

In 2018, she contributed to the book "Europee: dieci donne che fanno l'Europa" published by Textus Edizioni, of which she directs the series "Le vie da percorrere".

In 2019, she contributed to Legambiente's annual report "Un Green New Deal per l'Europa: Le idee e le sfide per rilanciare il progetto europeo", edited by Edoardo Zanchini and Mauro Albrizio, with a chapter on changing the EU to start a Green transformation.

Monica is actively involved in projects and events and writes publications on possible reforms on the European Union, focusing on the quality of democracy and the Green transformation of the economy. She contributes opinion pieces to discussions on EU affairs, energy and industrial policy, migration and Italian politics. She writes a blog for Il Fatto Quotidiano. and The Huffington Post and regularly publishes on EURACTIV and on the Green European Journal.

== Recognition ==
In 2010, Frassoni was nominated by the Foreign Policy magazine as one of the Top 100 Global Thinkers list, along with Marina Silva, Cécile Duflot and Renate Künast, for "taking Green mainstream". In 2016, she was included by EURACTIV among the 40 policy experts with influence in EU energy efficiency policy.
