= 2013 Geneva Grand Council election =

The 2013 election to the Grand Council was held in the canton of Geneva, Switzerland, on 6 October 2013. All 100 members of the Grand Council were elected for four-year terms.

== Results ==
Summary of the 6 October 2013 Geneva Grand Council election results
Party	Ideology	Vote %	Vote % ±	Seats	Seats ±
FDP.The Liberals	Classical liberalism	22.37	-3.93	24	–7^{1}
Geneva Citizens' Movement	Right-wing populism	19.23	+4.49	20	+3
Social Democratic Party	Democratic socialism	14.33	+1.42	15	±0
Christian Democratic People's Party	Christian democracy	10.61	+0.69	11	±0
Swiss People's Party	National conservatism	10.33	+1.77	11	+2
Green Party	Green politics	9.16	-6.18	10	-7
Together Left^{2}	Communism	8.75	-3.49	9	+9
Green Liberal Party	Green liberalism	3.06	+3.06	0	±0
Pirate Party	Pirate politics	1.61	+1.61	0	±0
Conservative Democratic Party	Conservative liberalism	0.56	+0.56	0	±0
Total		100.00	–	100	–
Turnout		41.05	1.39 ▲	–	–
^{1} The Liberal Party of Geneva merged with the Free Democratic Party into FDP.The Liberals in 2011. The total of both parties' seats are used for this calculation.^{2} Alliance of SolidaritéS, Swiss Party of Labour, left-wing independents, Defence of the Elderly, Tenants of Housing and Social (DAL), Alternative Left, the Communist Party of Geneva, and Action of Citizens and Workers in Struggle (ACTE)
Source: Republic and Canton of Geneva
