= 2013 Argentine provincial elections =

There were elections in the provinces in Argentina in 2013, for two governors and 13 provincial legislatures.

== Results ==
=== Buenos Aires Province ===
==== Senate ====
Party	Votes	%	Seats
Renewal Front	1,921,408	45.37	13
Front for Victory	1,244,013	29.37	7
Progressive, Civic and Social Front	572,474	13.52	3
United for Liberty and Labour	230,441	5.44	0
Workers' Left Front	227,540	5.37	0
Union with Faith	39,536	0.93	0
Invalid/blank votes	340,176	–	–
Total	4,575,588	100	23
Registered voters/turnout	4,235,412	92.57	–

==== Deputies ====
Party	Votes	%	Seats
Front for Victory	1.554.460	37,79	18
Renewal Front	1.533.736	37,29	16
Progressive, Civic and Social Front	474.195	11,53	9
United for Liberty and Labour	253.549	5.98	2
Workers' Left Front	232.976	5,66	1
Democratic People's Front And Social	45.455	1,11	0
Union with Faith	18.760	0,46	0
Invalid/blank votes	313,850	–	–
Total	4,426,981	100	46
Registered voters/turnout	4.113.131	92,91	–

=== City of Buenos Aires ===
==== Deputies ====
Party	Votes	%	Seats
Union Pro	618.496	33,59	12
UNEN	454.354	24,68	8
Front for Victory	315.418	17,13	6
Public Confidence	108.231	5,88	2
Workers' Left Front	91.313	4,96	1
Alternativa Popular	77.880	4,23	1
Self-determination and Freedom	51.059	2,77	0
Popular Path	35.247	1,91	0
Red Party	21.368	1,16	0
This Is Possible	13.082	0,71	0
Movement for Socialism	8.344	0,45	0
New Left	6.772	0,37	0
Liberal Libertarian Party	6.761	0,37	0
Peoples Reconstruction Party	5.042	0,28	0
Flurry Citizen	4.953	0,27	0
Democratic Left Sumar	4.930	0,27	0
Neighborhood Flag	3.845	0,21	0
Christian Democratic Party	2.978	0,16	0
Federal Party	2.813	0,15	0
The Movement	2.633	0,14	0
Constitutional Nationalist Party Unite	2.094	0,11	0
Citizen Action	2.057	0,11	0
Independent Movement For Justice And Dignity	1.566	0,09	0
Convergence Popular Porteña	0	0	0
Invalid/blank votes	96.607	–	–
Total	1.937.843	100	30
Registered voters/turnout	1.841.236	95,01	–

=== Catamarca ===
==== Senate ====
Party	Votes	%	Seats
Front for Victory	23.024	43,64	7
Progressive, Civic and Social Front	18.609	35,27	1
Third Position Front	7.835	14,85	0
Front Will Social	2.276	4,31	0
Action Popular	786	1,49	0
Workers' Socialist Movement	123	0,24	0
New Palklin	91	0,17	0
Popular Election By Unit	18	0,03	0
Invalid/blank votes	2,641	–	–
Total	55,403	100	8
Registered voters/turnout	52.762	95,23	–

==== Deputies ====
Party	Votes	%	Seats
Progressive, Civic and Social Front	75.760	37,55	9
Front for Victory	73.909	36,63	8
Third Position Front	33.573	16,64	4
Action Popular	5.402	2,68	0
Workers' Party	4.944	2,45	0
Front Will Social	4.658	2,31	0
Popular Election By Unit	2.100	1,04	0
Workers' Socialist Movement	1.417	0,70	0
Invalid/blank votes	8,228	–	–
Total	209,991	100	21
Registered voters/turnout	201.763	96,08	–

=== Chaco ===
==== Deputies ====
Party	Votes	%	Seats
Front for Victory	339.174	54,71	10
Union for Chaco	209.082	33,73	6
Workers' Party	28.971	4,67	0
Broad Front	16.014	2,58	0
Independent Movement for Justice and Dignity	7.256	1,17	0
Proyecto Sur	6.712	1,08	0
Civic Front Pro Chaco	6.490	1,05	0
Party Citizens To Govern	6.286	1,01	0
Invalid/blank votes	26.850	–	–
Total	646,835	100	16
Registered voters/turnout	619.985	95,85	–

=== Jujuy ===
==== Deputies ====
Party	Votes	%	Seats
Jujeño Front	111.433	32,42	10
Front for Victory	106.521	30,99	10
States And Organized	46.564	13,56	4
Workers' Left Front	21.889	6,37	0
Front First Jujuy	14.467	4,21	0
Front Union Pro	14.388	4,19	0
New Left	7.946	2,31	0
Renewal Front	5.656	1,65	0
Party for a People United	5.015	1,46	0
Multicultural Community Movement	4.509	1,31	0
Christian Democratic Party	2.043	0,59	0
Popular Party Project	1.927	0,56	0
This Is Possible	1.323	0,38	0
Invalid/blank votes	19.821	–	–
Total	363.502	100	24
Registered voters/turnout	343.681	94,55	–

=== La Rioja ===
==== Deputies ====
Party	Votes	%	Seats
Justicialist Party	8.500	7,17	4
Radical Civic Union	16.774	14,15	3
Front Peronism Rioja	15.907	13,41	3
Front Of People	8.332	7,03	2
Federal Party Front	4.844	4,09	2
United Front Rioja	9.964	8,40	1
Civic Coalition	6.635	5,60	1
Movement New Thirty De Noviembre	2.030	1,71	1
Party Loyalty and Dignity	2.013	1,70	1
Renewal Frente Amplio Popular	5.579	4,70	0
Social Meeting Rioja	5.238	4,42	0
Departmental Citizen Engagement Party	3.787	3,19	0
Left for a Socialist Option	2.769	2,34	0
Current States And Organized	2.749	2,32	0
Civic Force Rioja	2.264	1,91	0
Social Participation Front	2.142	1,81	0
Front With All	2.061	1,74	0
Front States	1.898	1,60	0
Social Concertation Neighborhood	1.843	1,55	0
This Is Possible	1.724	1,45	0
Grouping Vecinalista Top Riojanos	1.459	1,23	0
Movement Party Octobers	1.287	1,09	0
Rioja Renewal Movement	1.285	1,08	0
New Generation Party	1.252	1,06	0
Commitment Riojan Party	1.089	0,92	0
Communist Party	947	0,80	0
Victory Party	790	0,67	0
Republican Proposal	767	0,65	0
Renewal Driving	615	0,52	0
Independent Socialist Party	601	0,51	0
Popular Alternative Motion	575	0,48	0
Party New Exodus	566	0,48	0
Peronist Without Borders	196	0,22	0
Popular Municipal Association May 29 Vinchina	97	0,05	0
Invalid/blank votes	8.802	–	–
Total	127.381	100	18
Registered voters/turnout	118.579	93,09	–

=== Mendoza ===
==== Senate ====
Party	Votes	%	Seats
Radical Civic Union	469.319	46,66	11
Front for Victory	274.322	27,27	7
Workers' Left Front	138.334	13,75	1
Republican Proposal	53.785	5,35	0
Federal Compromise	38.951	3,87	0
Broad Progressive Front	20.524	2,04	0
Federal Party	5.414	0,54	0
Workers' Socialist Movement	5.267	0,52	0
Invalid/blank votes	35,377	–	–
Total	1,041,293	100	19
Registered voters/turnout	1.005.916	96,60	–

==== Deputies ====
Party	Votes	%	Seats
Radical Civic Union	466.310	46,48	13
Front for Victory	274.578	27,37	8
Workers' Left Front	137.885	13,74	3
Republican Proposal	54.590	5,44	0
Federal Compromise	39.076	3,89	0
Broad Progressive Front	20.224	2,02	0
Federal Party	5.327	0,53	0
Workers' Socialist Movement	5.310	0,53	0
Invalid/blank votes	36,766	–	–
Total	1,040,066	100	24
Registered voters/turnout	1.003.300	96,47	–

=== San Luis ===
==== Senate ====
Party	Votes	%	Seats
Federal Compromise	35.956	46,04	4
Progressive, Civic and Social Front	13.737	17,59	0
Front for Victory	10.466	13,40	0
Mercedinos Front for Change	8.051	10,31	0
Middle Class Project	3.507	4,49	0
Democratic Independente	3.426	4,39	0
New Generation Party	1.995	2,55	0
Neighborhood Independent Movement Party Provincial	962	1,23	0
Invalid/blank votes	10,587	–	–
Total	88,687	100	4
Registered voters/turnout	78.100	88,06	–

==== Deputies ====
Party	Votes	%	Seats
Federal Compromise	51.543	37,16	10
Progressive, Civic and Social Front	33.940	24,47	6
Front for Victory	30.023	21,64	5
Mercedinos Front for Change	6.850	4,93	1
Neighborhood Independent Movement Party Provincial	6.007	4,33	0
Democratic Independente	5.877	4,24	0
Democratic Convergence Party	4.478	3,23	0
Invalid/blank votes	18,485	–	–
Total	157,203	100	22
Registered voters/turnout	138.718	88,24	–

== See also ==
- 2013 Argentine legislative election
