= 2013 Minneapolis municipal election =

- November 5, 2013

A general election was held in Minneapolis on November 5, 2013. Minneapolis's mayor was up for election as well as all the seats on the City Council, the two elected seats on the Board of Estimate and Taxation, and all the seats on the Park and Recreation Board. Voters were able to rank up to three candidates for each office in order of preference.

== Mayor ==
Incumbent Democratic–Farmer–Labor Mayor R. T. Rybak announced on December 27, 2012, that he will not be seeking re-election. 35 candidates ran for election. Betsy Hodges was elected in the 33rd round after two days of vote tabulations.

== City Council ==
All 13 seats on the Minneapolis City Council were up for election.

== Board of Estimate and Taxation ==
The two elected seats on the Board of Estimate and Taxation were up for election. Incumbents Carol Becker and David Wheeler were re-elected in the first round, both having passed the threshold to be elected.

Members were elected citywide via the single transferable vote.

=== Candidates ===
Names of incumbents are italicized.

Candidate	Party endorsement
Carol Becker	Minneapolis DFL
David Pascoe	Minneapolis City Republican Committee (Note: A "recommendation." Not an official endorsement.)
Douglas Sembla	Minnesota Pirate Party
David Wheeler	Minneapolis DFL

=== Results ===
Candidate	% 1st Choice	Round 1
Carol Becker	49.02	23,949
David Wheeler	33.51	16,370
David Pascoe	11.90	5,813
Douglas Sembla	4.72	2,308
Write-ins	0.85	415
Threshold		16,286
Valid votes		48,855
Undervotes		31,246
Turnout	33.38	80,101
Registered voters		239,985
Source: Minneapolis Election & Voter Services

== Park and Recreation Board ==
All nine seats on the Park and Recreation Board were up for election. Three members were elected from one citywide, at-large district via the single transferable vote and six from single-member districts via instant-runoff voting.

=== Candidates ===
Names of incumbents are italicized.

District	Candidate	Party endorsement
At-large	Steve Barland	
At-large	John Erwin	Minneapolis DFL
At-large	Meg Forney	
At-large	Casper Hill	
At-large	Ishmael Israel	
At-large	Mary Lynn McPherson	
At-large	Tom Nordyke	Minneapolis DFL
At-large	Jason Stone	
At-large	Hashim Yonis	
At-large	Annie Young	Fifth District Green Party
1	Liz Wielinski	Minneapolis DFL
2	David Luce	Ecology Democracy Party
2	Jon Olson	Minneapolis DFL
3	Said Maye	
3	Scott Vreeland	Minneapolis DFL
4	Bobby Davis	
4	Anita Tabb	Minneapolis DFL
5	Steffanie Musich	Minneapolis DFL
6	Brad Bourn	Minneapolis DFL
6	Josh Neiman	

=== Results ===
==== At-large ====
As no candidate passed the maximum possible threshold to be elected in the first round, several rounds of vote tabulations were necessary until three members were elected. John Erwin was elected in the fourth round and Annie Young and Meg Forney in the ninth round.

Steve Barland, Meg Forney, Jason Stone, and Tom Nordyke were candidates in the 2009 Park and Recreation Board election, but were all defeated. Barland and Stone ran in District 5 and Forney in District 6. Tom Nordyke served on the Board as an at-large member from 2006 to 2009 and as its president from 2008 to 2009.

Candidate	% 1st Choice	Round 1	Round 2	Round 3	Round 4	Round 5	Round 6	Round 7	Round 8	Round 9	% Final
John Erwin	24.68	14,678	14,866	15,148	14,866.2472	14,866.2472	14,866.2472	14,866.2472	14,866.2472	14,866.2472	25.00
Annie Young	15.63	9,294	9,452	9,983	10,055.9492	11,055.9536	11,528.0696	12,030.4230	13,905.6980	13,905.6980	23.39
Meg Forney	13.21	7,856	8,031	8,403	8,423.6460	9,162.5760	9,833.4130	10,160.5990	10,973.3376	10,973.3376	18.45
Tom Nordyke	10.95	6,511	6,595	6,723	6,801.6408	7,044.4406	7,580.0216	7,733.3192	8,752.5316	8,752.5316	14.72
Jason Stone	9.01	5,357	5,477	5,766	5,811.6630	6,090.7604	6,544.1926	6,736.6204			
Hasim Yonis	6.33	3,762	3,799	4,329	4,333.6314	4,477.9662	4,559.0778				
Steve Barland	6.23	3,705	3,803	3,893	3,901.5374	4,114.1884					
Mary Lynn McPherson	5.67	3,373	3,479	3,681	3,688.4400						
Ishmael Israel	5.56	3,305	3,374								
Casper Hill	2.15	1,280									
Write-ins	0.58	342									
Exhausted ballots			587	1,537	1,580.2450	2,650.8676	4,551.9782	7,935.7912	10,965.1856	10,965.1856	18.44
Threshold: 14,866; Valid votes: 59,463; Undervotes: 20,638; Turnout: 80,101 (33.38%); Registered voters: 239,985
Source: Minneapolis Election & Voter Services

==== District 1 ====
Candidate	% 1st Choice	Round 1
Liz Wielinski	97.46	7,686
Write-ins	2.54	200
Maximum possible threshold		5,767
Valid votes		7,886
Overvotes		1
Undervotes		3,645
Turnout		11,532
Source: Minneapolis Election & Voter Services

==== District 2 ====
Candidate	% 1st Choice	Round 1
Jon Olson	67.23	4,070
David Luce	31.90	1,931
Write-ins	0.88	53
Threshold		3,028
Valid votes		6,054
Undervotes		2,404
Turnout		8,458
Source: Minneapolis Election & Voter Services

==== District 3 ====
Candidate	% 1st Choice	Round 1
Scott Vreeland	75.64	6,415
Said Maye	23.51	1,994
Write-ins	0.85	72
Maximum possible threshold		6,191
Valid votes		8,481
Undervotes		3,900
Turnout		12,381
Source: Minneapolis Election & Voter Services

==== District 4 ====
Candidate	% 1st Choice	Round 1
Anita Tabb	79.15	6,671
Bobby Davis	19.93	1,680
Write-ins	0.91	77
Maximum possible threshold		6,414
Valid votes		8,428
Overvotes		9
Undervotes		4,390
Turnout		12,827
Source: Minneapolis Election & Voter Services

==== District 5 ====
Candidate	% 1st Choice	Round 1
Steffanie Musich	97.97	10,834
Write-ins	2.03	224
Maximum possible threshold		8,191
Valid votes		11,058
Overvotes		3
Undervotes		5,319
Turnout		16,380
Source: Minneapolis Election & Voter Services

==== District 6 ====
Candidate	% 1st Choice	Round 1
Brad Bourn	64.80	8,903
Josh Neiman	34.76	4,775
Write-ins	0.44	61
Threshold		6,870
Valid votes		13,739
Undervotes		4,784
Turnout		18,523
Source: Minneapolis Election & Voter Services
