= 2013 Gambian local elections =

Local elections in Gambia

Local elections were held in The Gambia on 4 April 2013. The mayors of Banjul and Kanifing Municipality and councillors for 114 wards were elected.

The campaign period for the election was from 20 March to 2 April 2013.

== See also ==
- Elections in the Gambia
