= November 2013 San Francisco general election =

The November 2013 San Francisco general elections were held on November 5, 2013, in San Francisco, California. The elections included one seat on the San Francisco Board of Supervisors, assessor-recorder, city attorney, and treasurer; and four ballot measures.

== Board of Supervisors ==
=== District 4 ===

District 4 consists primarily of the Sunset district. Incumbent supervisor Katy Tang ran in her first election after being appointed by Mayor Ed Lee in the wake of Carmen Chu's resignation to be San Francisco Assessor-Recorder.

District 4 supervisorial special election, 2013
Candidate	Votes	%
Katy Tang (incumbent)	8,725	80.42
Ivan Seredni	1,753	16.16
Michael Murphy (write-in)	272	2.51
Other write-in	99	0.91
Total votes	10,849	100.00
Turnout	{{{votes}}}	31.76%

== Assessor-Recorder ==
One-term incumbent Carmen Chu, who was initially appointed by Mayor Ed Lee in February 2013, ran for her initial election unopposed.

San Francisco Assessor-Recorder special election, 2013
Candidate	Votes	%
Carmen Chu (incumbent)	95,849	98.05
write-in	3,110	1.95
Valid votes	98,959	76.75%
Invalid or blank votes	29,978	23.25
Total votes	128,937	100.00
Turnout	{{{votes}}}	29.30%

== City Attorney ==
Three-term incumbent Dennis Herrera ran for reelection unopposed.

San Francisco City Attorney election, 2013
Candidate	Votes	%
Dennis Herrera (incumbent)	95,323	96.91
write-in	3,044	3.09
Valid votes	98,367	76.29%
Invalid or blank votes	30,570	23.71
Total votes	128,937	100.00
Turnout	{{{votes}}}	29.30%

== Treasurer ==
Two-term incumbent José Cisneros ran for reelection unopposed.

San Francisco Treasurer election, 2013
Candidate	Votes	%
José Cisneros (incumbent)	91,421	96.97
write-in	2,957	3.13
Valid votes	94,378	73.20%
Invalid or blank votes	34,559	26.80
Total votes	128,937	100.00
Turnout	{{{votes}}}	29.30%

== Propositions ==
Note: "City" refers to the San Francisco municipal government.

=== Proposition A ===
Proposition A would require the Retiree Health Care Trust Fund to be fully funded or for certain budgetary criteria to be met before payments from the fund may be made.

Proposition A
Choice	Votes	%
For	82,426	68.24
Against	38,367	31.76
Total	120,793	100.00
Valid votes	120,793	93.68
Invalid/blank votes	8,144	6.32
Total votes	128,937	100.00
Registered voters/turnout		29.30

=== Proposition B ===
Proposition B would create a special district at 8 Washington Street, allowing for the development of residential units and commercial facilities with higher building height limits than currently zoned. Unlike Proposition C below, this measure is a ballot initiative filed by the project developer incorporating certain details of the entire project beyond building height limits.

Proposition B
Choice	Votes	%
For	47,257	37.21
Against	79,738	62.79
Total	126,995	100.00
Valid votes	126,995	98.49
Invalid/blank votes	1,942	1.51
Total votes	128,937	100.00
Registered voters/turnout		29.30

=== Proposition C ===
Proposition C would increase building height limits at 8 Washington Street. Unlike Proposition B above, this measure is a referendum on an ordinance passed by the San Francisco Board of Supervisors and only involves building height limits.

Proposition C
Choice	Votes	%
For	41,497	33.04
Against	84,083	66.96
Total	125,580	100.00
Valid votes	125,580	97.40
Invalid/blank votes	3,357	2.60
Total votes	128,937	100.00
Registered voters/turnout		29.30

=== Proposition D ===
Proposition D would make it City policy to utilize all available opportunities to lower the city's cost of prescription drugs and to ask state and federal representatives to sponsor legislation to reduce drug prices paid by the government.

Proposition D
Choice	Votes	%
For	97,084	79.72
Against	24,690	20.28
Total	121,774	100.00
Valid votes	122,494	95.00
Invalid/blank votes	6,443	5.00
Total votes	128,937	100.00
Registered voters/turnout		29.30
