= IEC connectors =

IEC connectors are electrical power connectors specified by IEC standards.

The term may refer to connectors specified by:

- IEC 62196, for electric vehicles
- IEC 60309, for industrial purposes
- IEC 60320, for appliance coupling, up to 250 V AC
- IEC 60906-1, up to 250 V AC
- IEC 60906-2, up to 125 V AC
- IEC 60906-3, safety extra-low voltage, 6 V, 12 V, 24 V, 48 V AC and DC
