= 2013 Armenian local elections =

Local elections were held in Armenia on 26 May, 17 November, and 8 December. The 5 May elections included the elections for Yerevan City Council. The Central Electoral Commission of Armenia released a preliminary vote tally in which the Republican Party of Armenia won a majority of seats with 55.9% of the vote, followed by Prosperous Armenia with 23.1%, and the opposition Barev Yerevan bloc with 8.48%. The election followed the disputed 2013 presidential vote, during which opposition candidate Raffi Hovannisian alleged electoral fraud and launched the "Barevolution" movement. The Yerevan council race was viewed as a key test of the opposition's strength in the capital. There were several domestic and international observers reporting irregularities during the election, while some aspects of the voting process were seen as improved, concerns about fairness persisted. Control of the Yerevan City Council was particularly significant, as nearly 40% of Armenia's population resides in their capital. The Republican Party's victory further consolidated their political dominance following success in national elections.

== Background ==
The elections took place in a politically charged environment following the February 2013 presidential election, in which incumbent President Serzh Sargsyan secured a second term in office. The election results were contested by opposition candidate Raffi Hovannisian, who alleged widespread electoral irregularities and organized a series of protests known as the "Barevolution" movement. Against this backdrop, the Yerevan City Council election attracted considerable attention from political parties, observers, and the media, as it was widely regarded as an indicator of public support for both the governing Republican Party and the opposition in Armenia's largest city. Control of the city council was considered particularly significant because the mayor of Yerevan is elected by the council, and the capital accounts for a substantial proportion of Armenia's population and economic activity.
