= Andrej Žernovski =

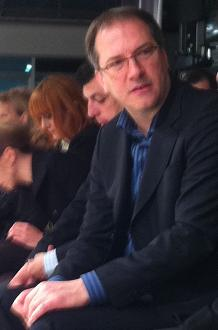

Mayor of the Municipality of Centar
- In office April 2013 – April 2017
- Succeeded by: Sasha Bogdanovikj

Personal details
- Born: 26 November 1968 (age 57) Skopje, SR Macedonia, SFR Yugoslavia

Andrej Žernovski (Macedonian: Андреј Жерновски; born 26 November 1968 in Skopje) is a Macedonian politician, leader of the Liberal Democratic Party (LDP) and the former Deputy foreign minister of his country. He served as mayor of the Centar Municipality of Skopje between 2013 and 2017.

== Biography ==
Andrej was born and grew up in the Center Municipality of Skopje. He graduated from Ss. Cyril and Methodius University in Skopje as a construction engineer. In 1993 he Žernovski joins the Liberal Democrat Party. Between 1994 and 1997 he is the leader of the youth wing of the party. Between the years 1996 and 2000 he was an advisor to the Council of the City of Skopje. Between 1998 and 2002, he is the speaker of the party. In year 2000 he works as an advisor to the mayor of City of Skopje. He holds this position until the year 2002, when he becomes a member of the Assembly of the Republic of Macedonia and member of the executive board of his party.

Since 2003 he is a member of the delegation of the Republic of Macedonia to the Council of Europe. From the year 2004 until the year 2006, he is the first president of the Common Inter-parliamentary Commission of the Macedonian Parliament and the European Parliament for the Integration of the Republic of Macedonia in the EU.

Žernovski holds his parliamentary position for 9 years and three mandates until the year 2011 when his party lost all seats in the Assembly. Following the becomes the leader of the Liberal Democrat Party taking the position of Jovan Manasievski, having served as a vice president to the party since 2006.

In late 2012, his party enters the opposition coalition Alliance for the Future and Žernovski becomes a candidate to the position Mayor of the Municipality of Center, Skopje. His opponent is the then mayor of the municipality, Vladimir Todorovik.

After a campaign of which the opposition labels as undemocratic and having many electoral manipulations, frauds and obstacles, as well as having three turns to the election, Žernovski is declared the winner of the election. A feat considered to be the greatest victory of the election by the opposition and media given the overall bad results for The Alliance for the Future coalition.

Žernovski started working as a mayor after his credentials were attributed to him by the previous mayor Todorovik. The process took a couple of weeks and the opposition blamed the party at power for the lengthy process. His leadership of the municipality being a controversial topic for some, Žernovski is often the target of criticisms by the pro-government media. This partly due to his insistence on freezing the project Skopje 2014, which he considers being the source of money laundering by the government, and an attack on the free will of the citizens of the Centar Municipality.

After the end of his term in 2017 he switched to SDSM party and from May 2018 until October 2023 was deputy foreign minister of North Macedonia. In early 2024 he was sent as ambassador to Bucharest, but after the 2024 North Macedonian presidential and parliamentary elections he was recalled in August 2024 by the new VMRO-DPMNE government.
