= 2013 Macedonian local elections =

The fifth local elections since the independence of the country for the election of local mayors of the municipalities of the Republic of Macedonia and members of municipality councils were held in 2013. There were two large coalitions on the elections: the Coalition for a Better Macedonia led by VMRO-DPMNE and the Union for the Future led by SDSM. Also present on the elections was the Democratic Union for Integration (DUI), Democratic Party of Albanians (DPA) and the Union of Roma Forces. There were two rounds in the elections on March 24, 2013, and April 7, 2013.

== Background ==
On December 24, 2012 (known as "Black Monday"), there was a session in the Assembly over the 2013 state budget. The opposition condemned the government's proposed budget as profligate during an economic crisis and demanded a reduce, but the government refused. The ruling coalition was accused by the opposition of abusing parliamentary process by pushing for a vote on the budget before the consideration of amendments. Opposition party Social Democratic Union of Macedonia (SDSM) deputies used intensive filibuster tactics to delay the adoption of the budget, by proposing endless amendments and delaying sessions. SDSM deputies surrounded the Assembly's speaker seat and did not allow him to lead the session. Security forces intervened, expelling opposition deputies and journalists from the Assembly. The violent intervention resulted in SDSM boycotting the work of the Assembly and threatening the resignation of its deputies, as well as boycotting the local elections. SDSM also organized short daily protests across the country. The local elections were announced on January 11, 2013. On March 1, 2013, the boycott ended with the intervention of the European Commission and the European Parliament. SDSM agreed to return to the Assembly and to participate in the local elections.

The election campaign for the first round lasted from March 4 to March 22, while the campaign for the second round was from March 24 to April 5. Parties, coalitions and independent candidates focused mostly on promises to improve local infrastructure during the campaign. During the campaign, private and public broadcasters displayed significant bias in favor of the ruling parties. In the ethnic Albanian political bloc, the main participants were the Democratic Union for Integration (DUI) and the Democratic Party of Albanians (DPA).

== Results ==
Out of 80 municipalities and the City of Skopje, VMRO-DPMNE gained 56 seats, DUI - 14, SDSM - 4, DPA - 2, independent candidates - 2, while the Democratic Party of Turks of Macedonia gained one. Out of 27 mayoral candidates, only 2 independent candidates were elected, but even those candidates were supported by the major political parties. The first round was held on March 24 and the second round on April 7. A total of 1,743,403 voters were registered, while there were 8,878 mayoral and councilor candidates. It was the seventh election in a row won by VMRO-DPMNE since 2006. In the first round, the turnout was 66.81%, while the second round had a turnout of 64.90%. In the first round of the elections, mayors of 49 municipalities were elected. In the second round, the mayor of the city of Skopje and 29 other municipalities were elected.

4 female mayors were elected, in Bogdanci, Gradsko, Kisela Voda and Tetovo. SDSM filed objections and lawsuits about the elections. 36 lawsuits about the second round were accepted, resulting in a re-vote on April 21 in the municipalities of Centar, Struga and Gjorče Petrov, and a second round was held in the municipality of Dolneni. The administrative had controversially decided to annull Andrej Žernovski's initial victory in Centar, which resulted in the resignation of the president of the court, who accused his colleagues of succumbing to political pressure.

The re-run in Centar had the same irregularities that were in the two rounds, including group voting, voters escorted by unidentified people and pressure on non-governmental observers, including pressure by police officers. Observers from the NGO Civil, the NGO MOST and the Macedonian Helsinki Committee for Human Rights reported that voters from other parts of the country were brought in and ethnic Macedonians from Albania allegedly had fake residency permits in Centar. Observers also reported other irregularities, including an outbreak of elevator breakdowns in tall apartment buildings in Centar, which they suspected was to discourage elderly people and disadvantaged people from going to vote. The coalition led by SDSM won in Centar.

Party	Votes	%	Mayors
Coalition For a Better Macedonia: Internal Macedonian Revolutionary Organization - Democratic Party for Macedonian National Unity; Socialist Party of Macedonia; Democratic Party of Serbs in Macedonia; Union of Roma; Democratic Party of Turks, etc.	?	?	56
Union For The Future: Social Democratic Union of Macedonia; New Social Democratic Party; Liberal Democratic Party; Internal Macedonian Revolutionary Organization – People's Party; United for Macedonia, etc.	?	?	4
Democratic Union for Integration	?	?	14
Democratic Party of Albanians	?	?	2
Democratic Party of Turks	?	?	1
Union of Roma	?	?	1
Liberal Democratic Party	?	?	1
Democratic Party of Serbs in Macedonia	?	?	1
Independents	?	?	2
Source: State Election Committee of Macedonia

== Aftermath ==
Per OSCE/ODIHR Election Observation Mission:

The 2013 municipal elections were efficiently administered and highly competitive. However, partisan media coverage and a blurring of state and party activities did not provide a level playing field for candidates to contest the elections. Further efforts are required to address gaps and ambiguities in the Electoral Code and improve confidence in the voter lists. Overall, both election days were calm and orderly, although some procedural irregularities were observed.

Observers from the NGOs MOST and MCMS reported irregularities, such as group voting, broken electoral stamps, a lack of voting slips and voters' names being read out publicly. The two main airports in Skopje and Ohrid had reported bomb scares, although no explosives were found. The incidents were related with the announced arrival of ethnic Albanian voters from Switzerland who were to vote in the western part of the country. A bomb scare also led to the evacuation of the pro-governmental Sitel TV station. Police reported that a group of youths demolished cars and stores in the Skopje suburb of Nerezi.

The campaign was assessed as "generally peaceful" in both rounds by the OSCE/ODIHR's mission, although cases of destruction of campaign material, vandalism of election headquarters, and physical attacks on the campaign's participants were observed. OSCE/ODIHR and MOST observers also reported abuse of state and public resources during the campaign, as well as significant support for mayoral candidates of the ruling parties by government officials. OSCE/ODIHR's mission reported that campaign material was placed on public property. OSCE/ODIHR's general assessment of the State Electoral Commission (SEC) was that its work was transparent and efficient, but in considering complaints from political parties, SEC's decisions were based on partisan bias. OSCE/ODIHR criticized irregularities such as family voting, the government's use of state resources in the election campaign, employment, subsidies for farmers, and pension increases. The Citizens' Association MOST reported that the first round occurred peacefully, reporting irregularities, such as group and family voting, non-use of the UV lamp, photographing of ballots and registration of voters by authorized party observers at the polling station, cases where voters were not on the voter list despite possessing biometric personal documents. MOST had a similar assessment of the second round, but reported that there were less irregularities than the first round. The ruling parties regarded the elections as fair and democratic, while the opposition parties considered the elections as illegitimate.

According to the non-governmental organization CIVIL, the elections had the following problems:

- "The politicization of institutions is far-reaching and omnipresent and undermines the overall level of democracy and rule of law";
- The Macedonian judiciary was "increasingly politicized and subordinated to the will of party leaders in power";
- The elections saw "the serious further erosion of democratic principles and procedures in Macedonia";
- Most journalists and media being under political control and well-founded allegations that police and the security services were "turned into servants of holders of political power";
- Public administration was under direct governmental control and required conduct propaganda, to reflect the picture of a highly controlled society, from which CIVIL assessed the elections as being far from free and democratic;
- Widespread violations of the campaign's rules, such as misuse of public administration and funds, threats of dismissals, visits from the financial police, terminating social and health assistance, vote buying and misuse of children (use of minors during the campaign through their distribution of propaganda leaflets, as well as attendance and assistance at party rallies);
- Public administration personnel were obliged to attend VMRO-DPMNE rallies during working time or give replacements, claiming that "otherwise they would face dismissal";
- Increased level of proxy voting, family voting, intimidation of electoral personnel and the unauthorized presence of political party staffers in and around polling stations;
- Manipulation of the voting process, with CIVIL saying that ethnic Macedonian "inhabitants of villages in the municipality of Pustec, in Albania, were hired en masse to vote in the Skopje municipality of Centre."
