= 2013 Liberian by-election =

The 2013 Liberian by-election was held on May 7 in Grand Bassa County. The election was boycotted by the Congress for Democratic Change. It was won by Nyonblee Karnga-Lawrence of the Liberty Party. She was the first female senator elected to represent Grand Bassa County.

== Background ==
Grand Bassa County Senator John Francis Whitfield of the National Patriotic Party (NPP) died on January 17, 2013. The National Elections Commission (NEC) was notified of the resultant Senate vacancy by February 19. The by-election to fill the vacancy was later scheduled for May 7.

By late March, President Ellen Johnson Sirleaf had nominated Jerome Korkoya as chairman of the NEC. The Congress for Democratic Change (CDC), a major opposition party, opposed Korkoya's nomination on the grounds of Korkoya's membership in the ruling Unity Party (UP). Korkoya explained that while he previous contested a legislative seat with the UP, that he had resigned from the party following the 2011 general election. The CDC declared that they would boycott the Grand Bassa senatorial by-election if Korkoya's nomination was not withdrawn. Despite the CDC's opposition, Korkoya's appointment was confirmed by the Senate on March 26.

In late March, Nyonblee Karnga-Lawrence was made the nominee for the Liberty Party (LP). Karnga-Lawrence's candidacy was backed by a coalition of at least 14 other political parties, including the Liberia Transformation Party, the Alliance for Peace and Democracy, and the Freedom Alliance Party. The coalition was intended to contest the 2014 Senate election as well as the 2017 general election. Initially, the National Union for Democratic Progress (NUDP) was involved in the coalition, though days later, the NUDP pulled out, with the party claiming their representatives at the LP event did not act in accordance with the NUDP executive committee. While the ruling UP had their own candidate, Jonathan Kaipay, many notable UP members supported Karnga-Lawrence.

Candidate nomination took place between March 11 and March 26. The four candidates were Karnga-Lawrence of the LP, Kaipay of the ruling UP, T. Wah Bedell of the NPP, and independent candidate Daniel Chea. Chea served as defense minister under President Charles Taylor. Chea and Karnga-Lawrence were the forerunners in the election. As reported by Heritage in late May, opinion polls in the election were very close between the two candidates, with Chea slightly in the lead.

The campaign took place between April 12 to May 5. In May, there was a debate held between the four candidates in front of a live audience as well as broadcast over radio. The following organizations were accredited as observers: the United States embassy, the International Foundation for Electoral Systems, the Open Society Initiative for West Africa, the Liberian Council of Churches, and the Press Union of Liberia.

== Aftermath ==
The election was held on May 7. It was peaceful but with a poor voter turnout of only 22.4%. According to the United States Department of State's 2013 country report on human rights practices in Liberia, "International observers deemed the election free and fair." Provisional results were released by the NEC on May 8. With 183 of 336 polling places counted, Chea was ahead of Karnga-Lawrence. The final results were announced on May 9 in Buchanan. Karnga-Lawrence was declared the winner and certificated as senator. She was the first female senator elected to represent Grand Bassa County.

== Results ==
The following are the results for the 2013 Liberian by-election from the NEC as reported by The Analyst.

2013 Grand Bassa County Senatorial By-election
Candidate	Party	Votes	%
Nyonblee Karnga-Lawrence	Liberty Party	11,000	41.04
Daniel L. Chea	Independent	9,102	33.96
Jonathan L. Kaipay	Unity Party	5,899	22.01
T. Wah Bedell	National Patriotic Party	801	2.99
Total		26,802	100.00
Valid votes		26,802	96.17
Invalid/blank votes		1,067	3.83
Total votes		27,869	100.00
LP gain from NPP			
