= 2013 Saint Helena general election =

General elections were held in Saint Helena on 17 July 2013.

== Electoral system ==
The 12 elected members of the Legislative Council were elected in a single constituency, with voters having 12 votes to cast. This marked a change from the 2009 elections, which saw Council members elected in two six-seat constituencies. A further three ex officio members were appointed to the Council.

A total of 20 candidates registered for the elections.

== Results ==
Candidate	Votes	%	Notes
Ian Sebastian Rummery	894	70.73	Elected
Lawson Arthur Henry	857	67.80	Elected
Nigel Dollery	845	66.85	Elected
Christine Scipio-O'Dean	771	61.00	Elected
Cyril Robert George	711	56.25	Elected
Leslie Paul Baldwin	680	53.80	Elected
Brian William Isaac	678	53.64	Elected
Derek Franklin Thomas	594	46.99	Elected
Anthony Arthur Green	570	45.09	Elected
Wilson Charles Duncan	536	42.41	Elected
Gavin George Ellick	511	40.43	Elected
Bernice Alicia Olsson	502	39.72	Elected
Audrey Mavis Constantine	419	33.15	
Brenda Elaine Moors	405	32.04	
Stedson Robert George	355	28.09	
Earl Hilton Henry	338	26.74	
Cyril Keith Gunnell	230	18.20	
Mervyn Robert Yon	202	15.98	
Lionel George Williams	188	14.87	
Raymond Kenneth Williams	153	12.10	
Total	10,439	100.00	
Valid votes	1,264	99.45	
Invalid/blank votes	7	0.55	
Total votes	1,271	100.00	
Registered voters/turnout	2,309	55.05	
Source: Government of St Helena, St Helena Online
