= Elections in the Gambia =

The Gambia elects on national level a head of state – the president – and a legislature. The president is elected for a five-year term by the people. The National Assembly has 53 members, 48 members elected for a five-year term and 5 members appointed (the fifth nominated member is the Speaker).

The Gambia was a one party dominant state with the Alliance for Patriotic Reorientation and Construction formerly in power until their defeat in 2017.

Opposition parties are allowed as part of a multi-party political system

Following the December 1, 2016 elections, the elections committee declared Adama Barrow winner of the elections. Incumbent president Yahya Jammeh accepted defeat on December 2.

== Implementation ==
For presidential elections, electors drop marbles in drums. There is one drum for each candidate. The drums are identified with the picture of the candidates and the colors of their parties. After identifying themselves, the electors' left forefinger is dipped in indelible ink to avoid repeated voting. Then they receive one marble and, in the secrecy of the polling booth, drop their marble in the chosen drum. A bell confirms the voting. After the voting, the marbles are quickly counted. The marble system dates to 1966.

== See also ==
- Electoral calendar
- Electoral system
