= 2013 Estonian municipal elections =

Municipal elections

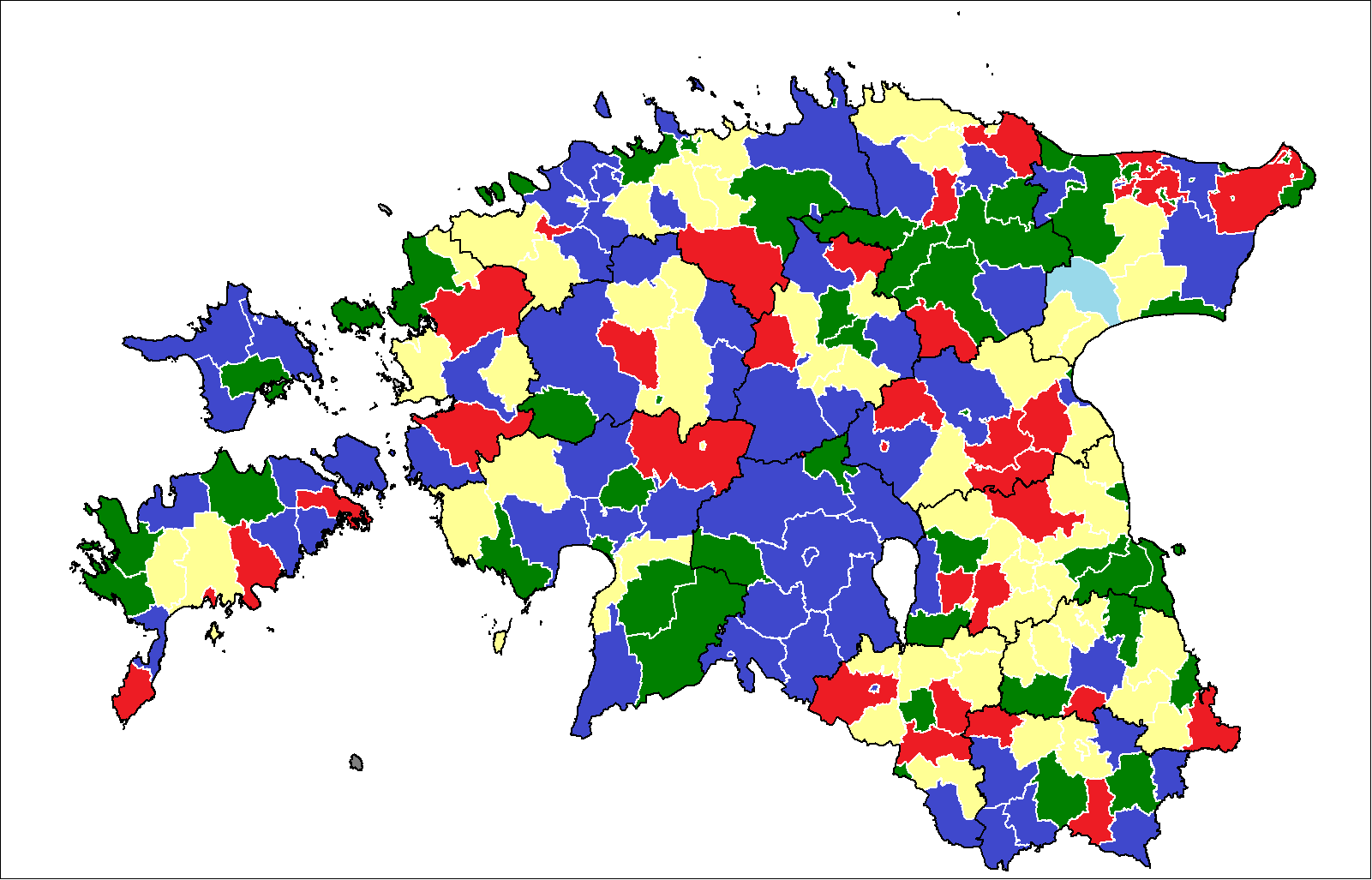
Leading party by municipality.

Municipal elections were held in Estonia on 20 October 2013, with advance voting between 10 and 16 October 2013. A total of 2,951 municipal council seats were up for election in 215 municipalities. The number of councillors had decreased by over 125 compared to the previous elections due to the merging of some municipalities.

The result was a victory for the Estonian Centre Party, which retained its majority in Tallinn by taking 46 of the 79 seats.

== Campaign ==
Alongside the six major parties, 102 independent candidates and 292 citizens' elections coalitions participated in the elections.

== Results ==
Party	Votes	%
Estonian Centre Party	199,876	31.96
Pro Patria and Res Publica Union	107,780	17.24
Estonian Reform Party	85,850	13.73
Social Democratic Party	79,493	12.71
Conservative People's Party of Estonia	8,337	1.33
Estonian United Left Party	36	0.01
Citizens' elections coalitions and independents	143,964	23.02
Total	625,336	100.00
Valid votes	625,336	99.25
Invalid/blank votes	4,714	0.75
Total votes	630,050	100.00
Registered voters/turnout	1,086,935	57.97
Source: VVK
