= Independent Election Commission (Jordan) =

National electoral commission of Jordan

- الهيئة المستقلة للانتخاب
- Honesty Integrity Neutrality

Agency overview
- Formed: 1 September 2011
- Jurisdiction: Jordan
- Headquarters: Amman
- Agency executive: Khaled Kalaldeh, President
- Website: www.iec.jo/en

The Independent Election Commission is the national electoral commission of Jordan, which is responsible for administering and supervising elections under the Constitution of Jordan.

An amendment to the constitution in 2011 enabled the establishment of the Commission, which was a demand from the Arab Spring protests. The commission is responsible for all elections in Jordan, including the general and local elections.
