= Local council (Jordan) =

Elected assembly of a locality in Jordan

Local council (Arabic: المجلس المحلي Al-Majlis Al-Mahali) is the elected assembly of a locality in Jordan. The first local councils were established in Jordan in 1925, and were elected consistently till today.

The latest amendment to the Municipalities law divided the Kingdom into 100 municipalities; 82 municipalities with 355 local councils, and 18 municipalities with none (due to their small size). Each local council consists of 5 members, including at least one woman. The highest voted for members of the local council is assigned a seat in the municipal council, whose number depends on what is assigned to each local council.

== See also ==
- Municipal council (Jordan)
- Governorate council (Jordan)
