= 2013 United States elections =

- ← 2011 2012 2013 2014 2015 → Off-year elections
- Election day: November 5

Senate elections
- Seats contested: 2 mid-term vacancies
- Net seat change: Democratic +1
- Map of the 2013 Senate special elections Democratic gain (1); Democratic hold (1)

House elections
- Seats contested: 6 mid-term vacancies
- Net seat change: 0
- Map of the 2013 House special elections Democratic hold (2); Republican hold (4)

Gubernatorial elections
- Seats contested: 2
- Net seat change: Democratic +1
- Map of the 2013 gubernatorial elections Democratic gain (1); Republican hold (1)

Elections were held in the United States on November 5, 2013. This off-year election cycle featured several special elections to the United States Congress; two gubernatorial races; state legislative elections in a few states; and numerous citizen initiatives, mayoral races, and a variety of other local offices on the ballot.

The Democratic Party picked up the governorship in Virginia as Terry McAuliffe was elected to replace term-limited Republican Bob McDonnell. Meanwhile, Republican New Jersey Governor Chris Christie was re-elected to a second term. Congressional special elections were held throughout the year. In total, two Senate seats and six House seats were contested. None of the House seats changed party hands, as well as the Massachusetts Senate seat. Democrats, however, regained the Senate seat in New Jersey, which was held by a Republican appointee.

The election results were seen as a slight success for President Barack Obama and the Democrats. It is rare for the President's party to win a Virginia gubernatorial election since 1973, and Democrats lost no ground in state legislatures and Congress.

== Federal elections ==
=== Senate ===
==== Massachusetts ====
On December 21, 2012, President Barack Obama nominated Massachusetts U.S. Senator John Kerry as Secretary of State. Kerry was confirmed by the United States Senate on January 29, 2013, by a vote of 94–3. Following the vote, Kerry resigned his Senate seat effective at February 1, 2013, at 4 p.m. Massachusetts law required a special election within 145 to 160 days after the vacancy occurred and allowed Governor Deval Patrick to appoint an interim senator until the winner of the special election can be sworn in. Patrick announced on January 30, 2013, that he would appoint his former Chief of Staff Mo Cowan to serve as the interim senator. Cowan was sworn in by Vice President of the United States Joe Biden on February 7, 2013. Cowan did not run in the special election. Massachusetts Secretary of the Commonwealth William F. Galvin set the dates for the election with the primaries on April 30, 2013, and the general election on June 25, 2013.

Democratic Congressman Ed Markey declared his candidacy on December 27, 2012, and was the favorite of the Democratic establishment, receiving endorsements from Kerry, Victoria Kennedy (the widow of former senator Ted Kennedy) and the Democratic Senatorial Campaign Committee. U.S. Representative Stephen Lynch also sought the Democratic nomination. Former U.S. Senator Scott Brown was considered the overwhelming Republican favorite, but announced on February 1, 2013, that he would not run in the special election. Kerry was re-elected in 2008 with 66 percent of the vote.

On April 30, 2013, Markey easily defeated Lynch to secure the Democratic nomination taking over 57 percent of the over 550,000 cast. Gabriel Gomez, a former Navy SEAL won the Republican nomination taking 51 percent of about 190,000 votes cast; defeating former United States Attorney for the District of Massachusetts and former Acting Director Bureau of Alcohol, Tobacco, Firearms and Explosives Michael Sullivan who had 36 percent and state Rep. Daniel Winslow, who had 13 percent.

Markey easily defeated Gomez on June 25, 2013, capturing over 625,000 votes of approximately 1.2 million cast, garnering approximately 55 percent to Gomez's 45 percent and less than 1 percent for Richard Heos, nominee of the Twelve Vision's Party.

==== New Jersey ====
89-year-old senator Frank Lautenberg, who had already announced retirement plans died on June 3, 2013. On June 4, 2013, New Jersey Governor Chris Christie set the dates for the special election with the primaries being held on August 13, 2013, and the general election being held on October 16, 2013. On June 6, 2013, Christie announced the appointment of New Jersey Attorney General Jeffrey Chiesa, a Republican, to serve as the interim senator until the winner of the special could be sworn in. Chiesa announced he would not run in the special election and was sworn in by Vice President Joe Biden on June 10, 2013.

Newark Mayor Cory Booker, won the Democratic nomination over Congressmen Rush D. Holt, Jr. and Frank Pallone, and New Jersey General Assembly Speaker Sheila Oliver. Steve Lonegan, a former mayor of Bogota backed by the Tea Party and a two-time GOP primary candidate for Governor of New Jersey, won the Republican nomination over health care reform advocate Alieta Eck.

The election on October 16, 2013, was won by Cory Booker with 54.6% of the vote, against 44.3% for Steve Lonegan. This senate election was a technical net gain for Democrats since Booker was replacing an appointed Republican. However, the gain was not enough to hold back the Republican wave which swept control of the senate just one year later.

=== United States House of Representatives ===
This off-year election cycle featured special elections to the 113th United States Congress to fill vacancies due to resignations. Six special elections have taken place to fill seats in the United States House of Representatives. Two were due to Congressmen taking seats in the United States Senate (Tim Scott of South Carolina and Ed Markey of Massachusetts), one resigned to take jobs in the private sector (Jo Ann Emerson of Missouri), one resigned to take a job in the public sector (Jo Bonner of Alabama), and Jesse Jackson Jr. resigned due to an impending federal indictment of misuse of campaign funds.

==== Illinois's 2nd congressional district ====
Jesse Jackson Jr. resigned on November 21, 2012, following a months-long battle with bipolar disorder and due to being subject to a federal investigation over the possible misuse of campaign funds. Democratic nominee Robin Kelly defeated Republican nominee Paul McKinley on April 9, 2013, taking 71 percent of about 82,000 votes cast.

==== South Carolina's 1st congressional district ====
Incumbent Tim Scott resigned when appointed U.S. senator. The Republican candidate, former governor Mark Sanford, who held the seat from 1995 to 2001, defeated Democratic nominee Elizabeth Colbert Busch, sister of comedian Stephen Colbert taking 54 percent.

==== Missouri's 8th congressional district ====
Incumbent Jo Ann Emerson resigned January 22, 2013, to become the CEO of the National Rural Electric Cooperative Association in March 2013. Republican Missouri state representative Jason Smith beat Democratic state representative John Hodges on June 4, 2013.

==== Massachusetts's 5th congressional district ====
Incumbent Democrat Ed Markey resigned on July 15, 2013 when elected U.S. senator. Democratic state senator Katherine Clark beat Republican lawyer Frank Addivinola on December 10, 2013.

==== Alabama's 1st congressional district ====
On May 23, 2013, Republican Incumbent Jo Bonner resigned August 15, 2013 to become the vice chancellor of government relations and economic development with the University of Alabama System, Republican former state senator Bradley Byrne beat Democratic real estate agent Burton LeFlore on December 17 by a wide margin.

==== Louisiana's 5th congressional district ====
On August 6, 2013, incumbent Rodney Alexander resigned September 26, 2013, citing the partisan gridlock in Congress, and became the Secretary of the Louisiana Department of Veterans Affairs under Governor Bobby Jindal.

On November 16, 2013, businessman Vance McAllister defeated fellow Republican state senator Neil Riser defeated Republican Riser in the November 16 run-off with 60 percent of the vote. and was sworn in by Boehner on November 21, 2013.

== State elections ==
=== Gubernatorial ===
Two states held gubernatorial elections in 2013:

- New Jersey: Republican Chris Christie ran for a second term and was challenged for the GOP nomination by Seth Grossman, a Republican lawyer and former Atlantic City Councilman. The declared Democratic candidates were State Senator Barbara Buono and Troy Webster. On June 4, 2013, Christie defeated Grossman to secure the GOP nomination with 92 percent of the vote and Buono defeated Webster for the Democratic nomination with 88 percent of the vote. Christie then won re-election on November 5
- Virginia: Republican Bob McDonnell was term-limited out of office. The Republican candidate was Virginia Attorney General Ken Cuccinelli. The Democratic candidate was former Democratic National Committee Chairman Terry McAuliffe. The Libertarian Party candidate was entrepreneur and lawyer Robert Sarvis. McAuliffe ended up winning the governorship in the general election

=== State legislatures ===
Legislative elections were held for the New Jersey Senate, New Jersey General Assembly, and the Virginia House of Delegates. In New Jersey, Democrats retained control of their majorities in the Senate and General Assembly. Republicans held a majority in the Virginia House of Delegates.

=== State courts ===
Judicial elections were held for New York State Supreme Court in most of its 13 Judicial Districts.

=== Ballot measures ===
31 ballot measures were voted on across 6 states. Such measures included a non-binding vote to create a new state in Northern Colorado, tax and marijuana issues in Colorado, an initiative to require labeling of genetically modified food in the state of Washington, and an amendment to raise the minimum wage in New Jersey. New Yorkers similarly voted to amend its constitution in several minor ways, but voted against raising the retirement age for judges.

== Municipal elections ==
Various elections were held for officeholders in numerous cities, counties, school boards, special districts and others around the country.

=== Mayoral elections ===
Some of the large cities holding mayoral elections included:

- Albany, NY: Incumbent Democratic mayor Gerald Jennings declined to run for a sixth term. City Treasurer Kathy Sheehan easily won both the Democratic primary and the general election
- Albuquerque, NM: Mayor Richard J. Berry won a second term on Oct. 8
- Allentown, PA: Incumbent Democratic mayor Ed Pawlowski was re-elected to a third term
- Arlington, TX: Mayor Robert Cluck won a sixth two-year term on May 11, 2013
- Atlanta, GA: Mayor Kasim Reed ran for re-election and won a second term
- Atlantic City, NJ: Incumbent Democratic mayor Lorenzo Langford was narrowly defeated for re-election to a third term in a huge upset by Republican Don Guardian
- Boston, MA: Thomas Menino chose not to run for another term. Marty Walsh was elected on Nov. 5, 2013
- Buffalo, NY: Incumbent Democratic mayor Byron Brown was re-elected to a third term in a landslide against Republican Sergio Rodriguez
- Detroit, MI: Incumbent Dave Bing did not seek re-election. Former Wayne County Prosecutor Mike Duggan defeated Wayne County Sheriff Benny Napoleon
- El Paso, TX: John Cook was term-limited out of office. Oscar Leeser was elected mayor in a runoff
- Greensboro, NC: Incumbent Robbie Perkins was unseated by Nancy Vaughan
- Henderson, NV: Incumbent Andy Hafen was re-elected to a second term
- Houston, TX: Incumbent Annise Parker was re-elected to a third term
- Lancaster, PA: Incumbent Rick Gray was re-elected to a third term
- Los Angeles, CA: Antonio Villaraigosa was term-limited out of office and was succeeded by Eric Garcetti
- Miami, FL: Mayor Tomas Regalado ran for another term
- Minneapolis, MN: Incumbent R. T. Rybak declined to run for another term. Betsy Hodges was elected to replace him
- New York City, NY: Incumbent mayor Michael Bloomberg was term-limited out of office. Democrat Bill de Blasio defeated Republican Joe Lhota to succeed him
- North Las Vegas, NV: Incumbent Republican Shari Buck was defeated by Democrat John Jay Lee
- Omaha, NE: Jean Stothert was elected as Omaha's first female mayor, defeating incumbent Jim Suttle
- Pittsburgh, PA: Luke Ravenstahl did not run for another term. Bill Peduto was elected as his replacement
- Raleigh, NC: Nancy McFarlane was re-elected to another term
- Rochester, NY: Incumbent mayor Thomas Richards was defeated in the Democratic primary in his bid for a full term by Lovely A. Warren. Richards was on the ballot on the Independence Party and Working Families Party lines, but endorsed Warren, who defeated him in the general election, becoming the city's first female mayor
- St. Paul, MN: Chris Coleman (politician) was re-elected
- San Antonio, TX: Julian Castro was re-elected on May 11, 2013
- San Bernardino, CA
- San Diego, California: A special election was held on November 19 following the resignation of Bob Filner on August 30, 2013. Kevin Faulconer and David Alvarez received the first and second most votes respectively. Because neither candidate received a majority of the vote, a runoff election was scheduled for February 2014
- Seattle, WA: Ed Murray defeated incumbent Michael McGinn
- St. Petersburg, FL: Incumbent Republican Bill Foster was defeated by Democrat Rick Kriseman
- Syracuse, NY: Incumbent Democratic mayor Stephanie Miner was re-elected to a second term in a landslide

=== Other local elections ===
Some of the major local elections included:

- New York:
  - New York City Public Advocate
  - New York City City Comptroller
  - New York City Borough presidents
  - Sheriff, county clerk, and coroner of Albany County, New York
  - County clerk and district attorney for Genesee County, New York
  - Sheriff and district attorney for Saratoga County, New York
- Seattle:
  - City Council Kshama Sawant is the first Socialist elected to Seattle city council in 97 years, defeating the 16-year incumbent.

== Tables of partisan control results ==
These tables show the partisan results of the Congressional special elections and gubernatorial races in 2013. Bold indicates a change in control.

Senate seats
Seat	Before 2013 elections	After 2013 elections
Massachusetts Class 2	Democratic	Democratic
New Jersey Class 2	Republican (Note: The vacancy resulted from the death of Democratic Senator Frank Lautenberg on June 3, 2013. Republican Jeffrey Chiesa was appointed on June 4 to serve as interim senator until the winner of the October 16 special election was sworn in.)	**Democratic**

House Congressional seats
Seat	Before 2013 elections	After 2013 elections
Alabama 1st	Republican	Republican
Illinois 2nd	Democratic	Democratic
Louisiana 5th	Republican	Republican
Massachusetts 5th	Democratic	Democratic
Missouri 8th	Republican	Republican
South Carolina 1st	Republican	Republican

Governorships
State	Before 2013 elections	After 2013 elections
New Jersey	Republican	Republican
Virginia	Republican	**Democratic**
