= 2013 United States ballot measures =

- November 5, 2013

Part of the 2013 United States elections

The following is a list of ballot measures, whether initiated by legislators or citizens, which were certified to appear on various states' ballots during the 2013 United States elections.

== By state ==
=== Colorado ===
Origin	Status	Measure	Description (Result of a "yes" vote)	Date	Yes	No
Legislature	Approved	Colorado Proposition AA, Taxes on the Sale of Marijuana	Impose a 15% excise tax on all recreational marijuana sales in the state earmarked to fund the construction of schools, and implement a 10% sales tax in addition to Colorado's standard 2.9% state sales tax and any local sales taxes that may apply, with revenue from the sales tax part of Proposition AA earmarked for the regulation and monitoring of marijuana retail businesses.	Nov 5	902,181; 65.27%	479,992; 34.73%
Legislature	Failed	Colorado Tax Increase for Education, Amendment 66	Allow for the implementation of the new Public School Finance Act Senate Bill 213 and increase the state's income tax to raise the amount of state tax revenue spent on public school districts by about 16.6%, from $5.5 billion under the current law, to a little over $6.4 billion.	Nov 5	496,151; 35.54%	899,927; 64.46%

=== Maine ===
Origin	Status	Measure	Description (Result of a "yes" vote)	Date	Yes	No
Bond Issue	Approved	Maine Army National Guard Readiness Center Bond, Question 1	Authorize the issuance of a $14,000,000 bond for the stated purposes of maintaining, repairing, improving and modernizing energy efficiency for Maine Army National Guard readiness centers and support facilities and for purchasing land for military training.	Nov 5	126,393; 58.37%	90,130; 41.63%
Bond Issue	Approved	Maine University System Bond, Question 2	Authorize the issuance of a $15,500,000 bond for the stated purposes of updating existing laboratory and classroom facilities of the University of Maine System in order to enhance educational and employment opportunities for state citizens and students.	Nov 5	132,759; 61.07%	84,647; 38.93%
Bond Issue	Approved	Maine Transportation Reconstruction and Rehabilitation Bond, Question 3	Authorize the issuance of a $100,000,000 bond for the stated purposes of reconstructing and rehabilitating highways, bridges and facilities related to ports, harbors, marine transportation, freight and passenger railroads, aviation and transit and would match an estimated $154,000,000 in federal and other funds.	Nov 5	157,190; 72.74%	59,895; 27.26%
Bond Issue	Approved	Maine Maritime Academy Science Center Bond, Question 4	Authorize the issuance of a $4,500,000 bond for the stated purposes of providing for a public-private partnership building project for a new science facility at the Maine Maritime Academy.	Nov 5	114,348; 52.80%	102,233; 47.20%
Bond Issue	Approved	Maine Community College System Building Upgrade Bond, Question 5	Authorize the issuance of a $15,500,000 bond for the stated purposes of upgrading buildings, classrooms and laboratories on the 7 campuses of the Maine Community College System in order to increase capacity to serve more students through expanded academic programs in health care, precision machining, information technology, criminal justice and others.	Nov 5	143,026; 65.58%	75,073; 34.42%

=== New Jersey ===
Origin	Status	Measure	Description (Result of a "yes" vote)	Date	Yes	No
Legislature	Approved	New Jersey Support for Veterans' Organizations from Gambling Proceeds Amendment, Public Question 1	Allow veterans’ organizations to use money collected from existing games of chance, such as bingo, raffles and lotteries, to support their organizations.	Nov 5	1,372,178; 81.29%	315,867; 18.71%
Legislature	Approved	New Jersey Minimum Wage Increase Amendment, Public Question 2	Set the minimum wage at $8.25 per hour with annual adjustments for inflation beginning January 1, 2014.	Nov 5	1,052,287; 61.26%	665,380; 38.74%

=== New York ===
Origin	Status	Measure	Description (Result of a "yes" vote)	Date	Yes	No
Legislature	Approved	New York Casino Gambling Amendment, Proposal 1	Allow the legislature to authorize up to seven casinos in the state, specifically for stated purposes of promoting job growth, increasing funding to schools and permitting local governments to lower property taxes.	Nov 5	1,579,755; 57.11%	1,186,275; 42.89%
Legislature	Approved	New York Civil Service Credits for Disabled Veterans Amendment, Proposal 2	Entitle veterans with certified combat-related disabilities extra credits towards eligibility when competing for civil service appointments or promotions.	Nov 5	2,173,484; 83.65%	424,858; 16.35%
Legislature	Approved	New York Municipal Debt Limit Exemption for Sewage Improvements Amendment, Proposal 3	Allow municipalities to exclude from their constitutional debt limits the debt resulting from the construction or maintenance of sewer facilities, for an additional ten years.	Nov 5	1,497,865; 62.27%	907,731; 37.73%
Legislature	Approved	New York Township 40 Land Dispute Settlement Amendment, Proposal 4	Authorize the state legislature to settle longstanding disputes between the state and private landowners over ownership of parcels of land in the town of Long Lake, Hamilton County, located in the Adirondack Forest Preserve. In exchange for giving up claims to the disputed parcels, the state shall acquire land for the forest preserve from landowner payments over time.	Nov 5	1,744,371; 72.66%	656,371; 27.34%
Legislature	Approved	New York Land Swap With NYCO Minerals Amendment, Proposal 5	Authorize the state legislature to conduct a land exchange with NYCO Minerals Inc. in the Adirondack Forest Preserve. The firm shall give the forest preserve the equivalent value amount of land as the two hundred acres acquired in the exchange, with the land estimated to be worth, at minimum, $1 million, thereby mandating an exchange of 1,500 acres for the 200 acres received. Furthermore, require NYCO to reclaim and return the 200 acres to the state after mining production ceases.	Nov 5	1,276,595; 53.22%	1,122,055; 46.78%
Legislature	Failed	New York Mandatory Judicial Retirement Age Amendment, Proposal 6	Increase the maximum age of judicial service to 80 for Justices of the Supreme Court and Judges of the Court of Appeals.	Nov 5	1,061,662; 41.83%	1,476,646; 58.17%

=== Texas ===
Origin	Status	Measure	Description (Result of a "yes" vote)	Date	Yes	No
Legislature	Approved	Texas Tax Exemption on Residences of Service Members Killed in Action Amendment, Proposition 1	Grant the legislature authorization to provide property tax exemptions on all or part of the market value of the home of a member of the armed services who was killed in action to the surviving spouse, provided that the surviving spouse has not since remarried. Additionally, entitle the surviving spouse to a property tax exemption on the new home equal to the amount of the original exemption for the first home if the surviving spouse qualifies for and receives such an exemption and later qualifies a different property as his or her residence.	Nov 5	999,724; 86.98%	149,613; 13.01%
Legislature	Approved	Texas State Medical Education Board and State Medical Education Fund Elimination Amendment, Proposition 2	Implement a constitutional amendment eliminating an obsolete requirement for a State Medical Education Board and a State Medical Education Fund.	Nov 5	950,046; 84.69%	171,666; 15.30%
Legislature	Approved	Texas Political Subdivision for Aircraft Tax Exemption Amendment, Proposition 3	Grant authority to politically subdivide the state to increase the number of days that property tax-exempt aircraft parts may be located in the state for the purpose of qualifying these parts for the exemption.	Nov 5	626,602; 57.73%	458,767; 42.26%
Legislature	Approved	Texas Disabled Veteran Residence Tax Exemption Amendment, Proposition 4	Grant the legislature authorization to provide property tax exemptions to partially disabled veterans or their surviving spouses on part of the market value of their residence homesteads if the homesteads were donated to the veteran by a charity.	Nov 5	965,377; 85.14%	168,435; 14.85%
Legislature	Approved	Texas Reverse Mortgage Loan Amendment, Proposition 5	Authorize the making of a reverse mortgage loan for the purchase of a home and amended certain requirements regarding a reverse mortgage loan.	Nov 5	683,402; 62.61%	408,197; 37.39%
Legislature	Approved	Texas State Water Fund Amendment, Proposition 6	Withdraw approximately $2 billion will be withdrawn from the Texas Economic Stabilization Fund (ESF) to finance two new funds: the State Water Implementation Fund for Texas (SWIFT) and the State Water Implementation Revenue Fund for Texas (SWIRFT) to assist in the financing of priority projects in the state water plan.	Nov 5	839,369; 73.35%	304,981; 26.65%
Legislature	Approved	Texas Home Rule Charter Provision Amendment, Proposition 7	Authorize a home-rule municipality to provide in its charter the procedure to fill a vacancy on its governing body for which the unexpired term is 12 months or less.	Nov 5	809,844; 74.38%	278,878; 25.62%
Legislature	Approved	Texas Repeal of Hidalgo County Hospital District Amendment, Proposition 8	Repeal the constitutional provision that authorized the creation of a hospital district in Hidalgo County.	Nov 5	743,510; 72.37%	283,933; 27.63%
Legislature	Approved	Texas Expanded Judicial Sanctions Amendment, Proposition 9	Expand the types of sanctions that could be assessed against a judge or justice following a formal proceeding instituted by the State Commission on Judicial Conduct.	Nov 5	925,509; 84.65%	167,825; 15.34%

=== Washington ===
Origin	Status	Measure	Description (Result of a "yes" vote)	Date	Yes	No
Citizens	Failed	Washington "Protect the Initiative Act", Initiative 517	Implement penalties for intimidating, harassing, interfering with or retaliating against petition drive efforts for a ballot initiative.	Nov 5	629,584; 37.29%	1,058,572; 62.71%
Citizens	Failed	Washington Mandatory Labeling of Genetically Engineered Food Measure, Initiative 522	Require certain foods and seeds for sale to consumers that come from plants or animals which contain genetically modified organisms to be labeled as such., with incorrectly labeled foods facing a penalty of up to $1,000 per day per mislabeled item able to be assessed onto the violator.	Nov 5	857,511; 48.91%	895,557; 51.09%
Advisory Question	Approved	Washington Leasehold Excise Tax Credit Elimination Question, Advisory Vote 3	Advise the legislature to maintain the elimination of a leasehold excise tax credit for taxpayers who lease publicly-owned property by Senate Bill 5444 to generate an estimated $2,000,000 in government revenue.	Nov 5	813,990; 52.47%	737,365; 47.53%
Advisory Question	Approved	Washington Aircraft Excise Tax Question, Advisory Vote 4	Advise the legislature to maintain the imposition of an aircraft excise tax on commuter air carriers by Senate Bill 5627, to generate an estimated $500,000 in revenue for the state.	Nov 5	835,415; 53.54%	724,935; 46.46%
Advisory Question	Failed	Washington Insurance Premium Tax Question, Advisory Vote 5	Advise the legislature to maintain the extension of the insurance premium tax to some insurance for pediatric oral services.	Nov 5	612,611; 39.52%	937,473; 60.48%
Advisory Question	Failed	Washington Retail Sales Tax Exemption Elimination Question, Advisory Vote 6	Advise the legislature to maintain the elimination of a retail sales tax exemption for certain telephone and telecommunications services.	Nov 5	744,392; 47.74%	814,968; 52.26%
Advisory Question	Approved	Washington Estate Tax Extension Question, Advisory Vote 7	Advise the legislature to maintain the extension of an estate tax on certain property transfers and increased rates for estates over $4,000,000.	Nov 5	803,695; 51.23%	765,187; 48.77%
