= 2013 New Jersey elections =

New Jersey election

- November 5, 2013

A general election was held in the U.S. state of New Jersey on November 5, 2013. Primary elections were held on June 4. Every state position was up in this election cycle, which includes all 80 seats in the New Jersey General Assembly and all 40 seats in the Senate, as well as Governor and Lieutenant Governor. In addition to the State Legislative elections, numerous county offices and freeholders in addition to municipal offices were up for election. There were two statewide ballot questions. Some counties and municipalities may have had local ballot questions as well. Non-partisan local elections, some school board elections, and some fire district elections also happened throughout the year.

Additionally, the 2013 United States Senate special election in New Jersey in October was held to fill the seat of Democrat Frank Lautenberg following his death in June 2013.

== Gubernatorial election ==
2013 New Jersey gubernatorial election
- November 5, 2013
- Turnout: 39.6% (▼7.3%)
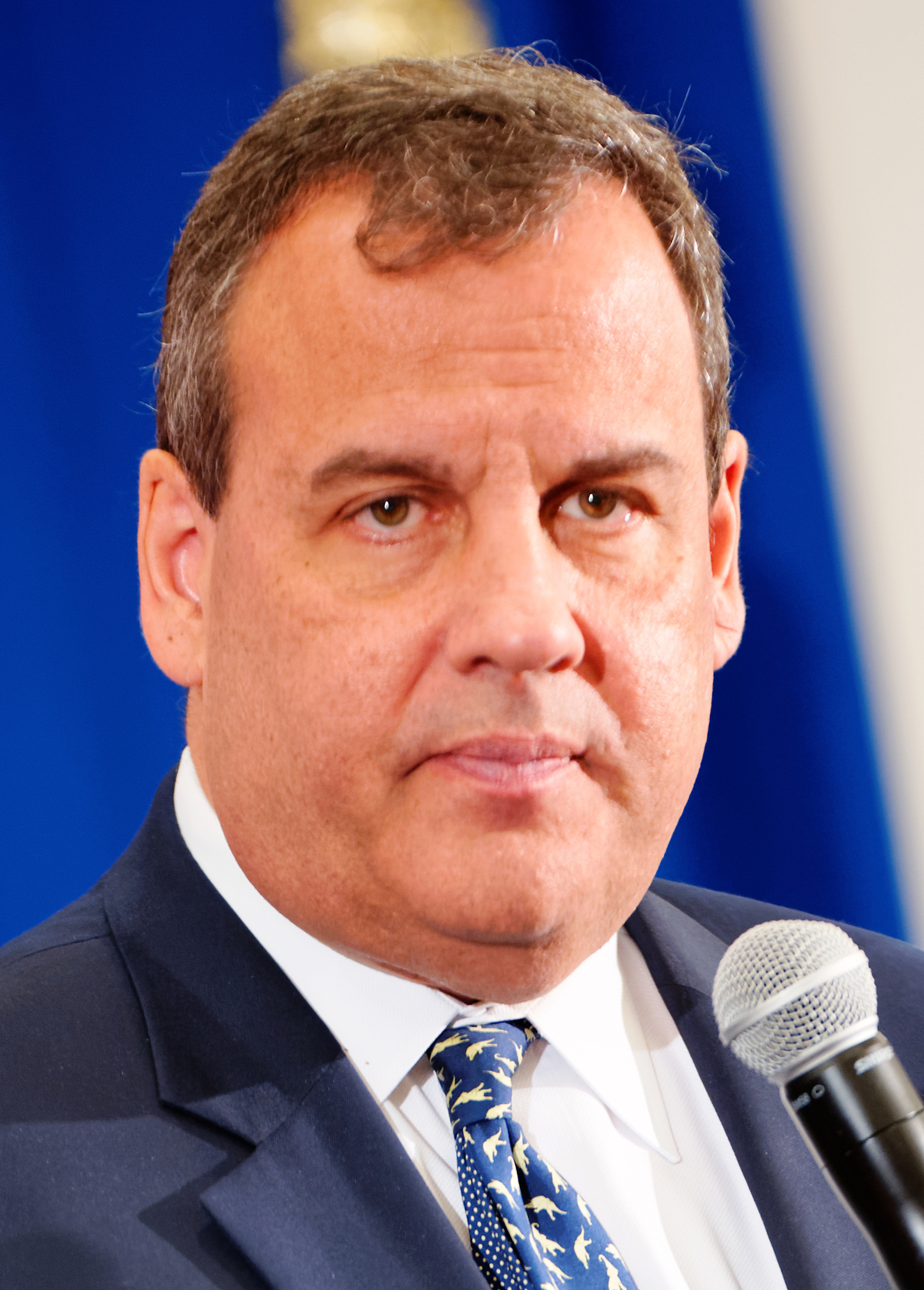

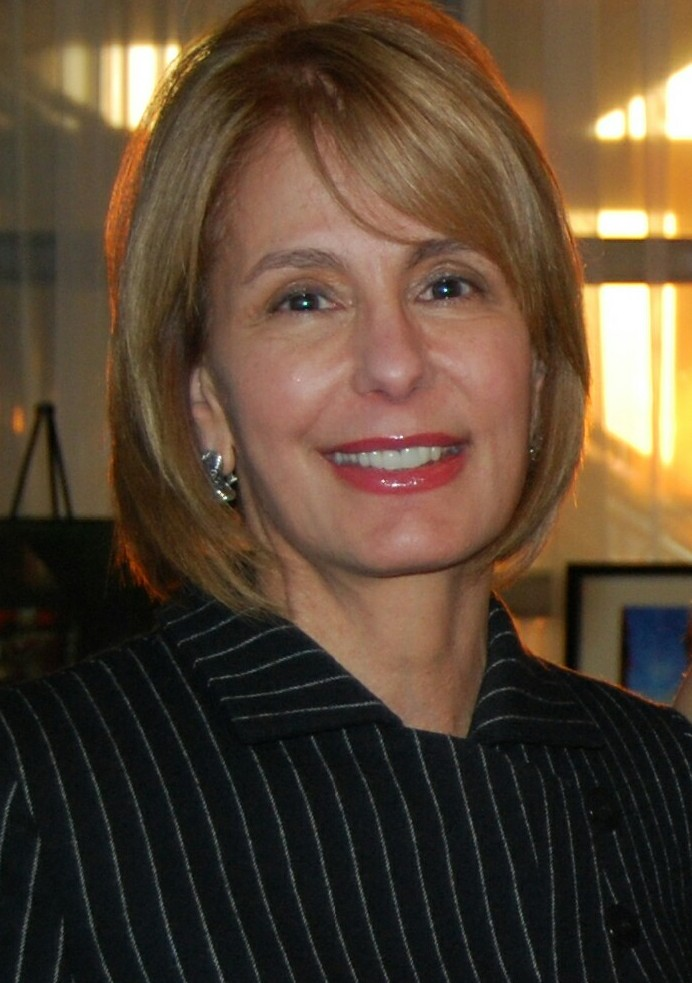
Nominee	Chris Christie	Barbara Buono
Party	Republican	Democratic
Running mate	Kim Guadagno	Milly Silva
Popular vote	1,278,932	809,978
Percentage	60.3%	38.2%
- Christie: 40–50% 50–60% 60–70% 70–80% 80–90% >90% Buono: 40–50% 50–60% 60–70% 70–80% 80–90%
Governor before election
Chris Christie
Republican
Elected Governor
Chris Christie
Republican

Incumbent Republican Governor Chris Christie and Lieutenant Governor Kim Guadagno won re-election against Democrats Barbara Buono and Milly Silva by a margin of 60.3%–38.2%.

== Legislature ==
=== Senate ===
2013 New Jersey State Senate election
- November 5, 2013

All 40 seats in the New Jersey Senate 21 seats needed for a majority
- Turnout: 34.4%
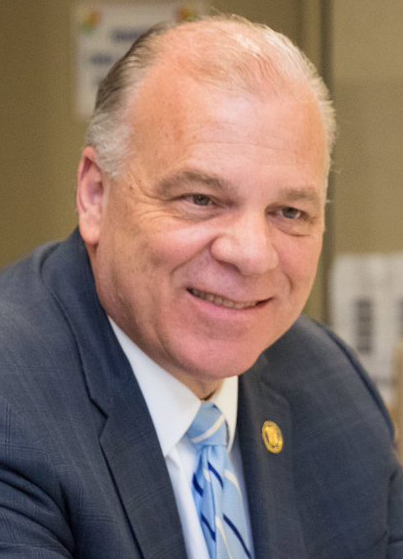

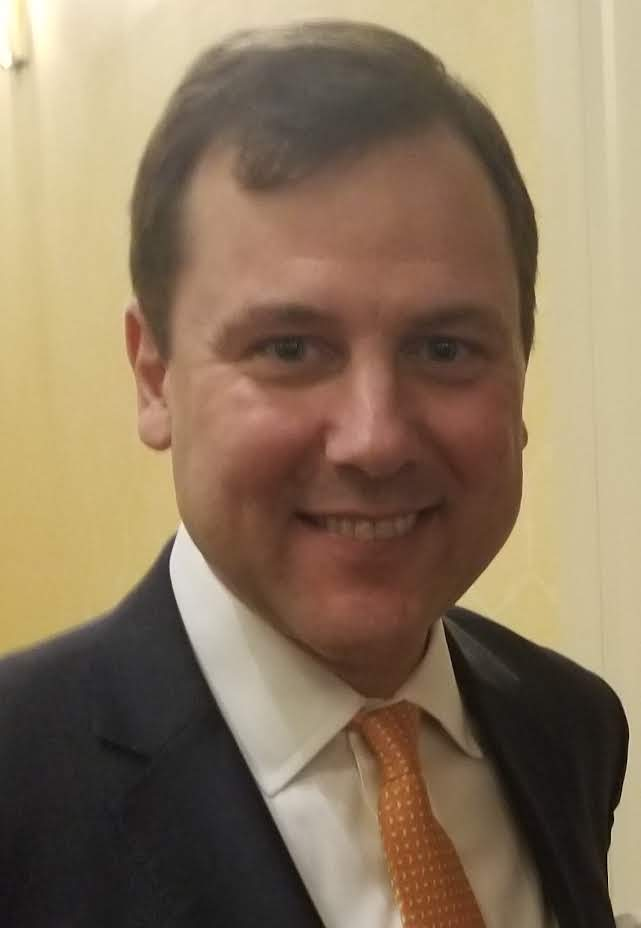
	Majority party	Minority party
Leader	Steve Sweeney	Thomas Kean Jr.
Party	Democratic	Republican
Leader's seat	District 3 (West Deptford)	District 21 (Westfield)
Last election	24	16
Seats won	24	16
Seat change	Steady	Steady
Popular vote	899,672	988,214
Percentage	47.4%	52.1%
Swing	▼3.7%	▲3.4%
- Results by district Democratic hold Republican hold
Senate President before election
Stephen M. Sweeney
Democratic
Elected Senate President
Stephen M. Sweeney
Democratic

Democrats held their majority in the State Senate, winning 24 seats while Republicans won 16.

=== General Assembly ===
2013 New Jersey General Assembly election
- November 5, 2013

All 80 seats in the New Jersey General Assembly 41 seats needed for a majority
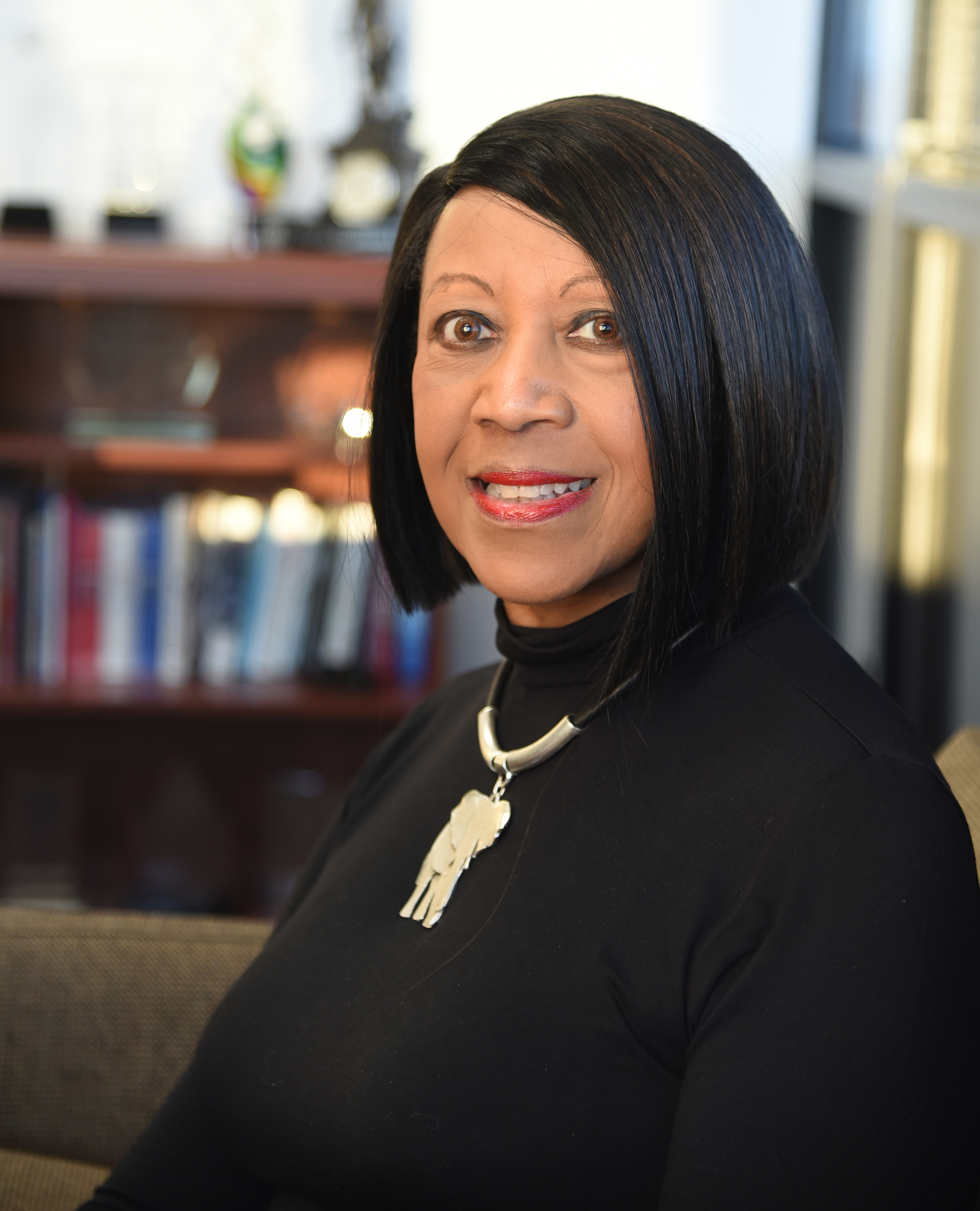
	Majority party	Minority party
Leader	Sheila Oliver (stepped down)	Jon Bramnick
Party	Democratic	Republican
Leader since	January 12, 2010	January 17, 2012
Leader's seat	34th (East Orange)	21st (Westfield)
Last election	48	32
Seats won	48	32
Seat change	Steady	Steady
Popular vote	1,828,078	1,907,361
Percentage	48.7%	50.7%
Swing	▼2.5%	▲2.7%
- Results: Democratic hold Democratic gain Republican hold Republican gain
Speaker before election
Sheila Oliver
Democratic
Elected Speaker
Vincent Prieto
Democratic

All 80 seats in the General Assembly were up for election this year. In each Legislative district, there are two people elected; the top two winners in the general election are the ones sent to the Assembly. Typically, the two members of each party run as a team in each election. After the previous election, Democrats captured 48 seats while the Republicans won 32 seats.

Democrats flipped one seat in the 2nd district and Republicans flipped one in the 1st district, leaving the balance of power unchanged at 48–32, despite Democrats losing the popular vote. This remains the last election in which the party that won control of the General Assembly did not win a majority of votes.

== Ballot measures ==
Two statewide questions were on the ballot, which were approved by voters:

- Public Question Number 1: Allows veterans' organizations to use money collected from existing games of chance to support their organizations.
- Public Question Number 2: Increases the state minimum wage.

== Local offices ==
Various county and municipal elections were held simultaneously, including elections for mayor in Atlantic City, Hoboken, and Jersey City.

== Senate special election ==
2013 United States Senate special election in New Jersey
- October 16, 2013
- Turnout: 24.5%
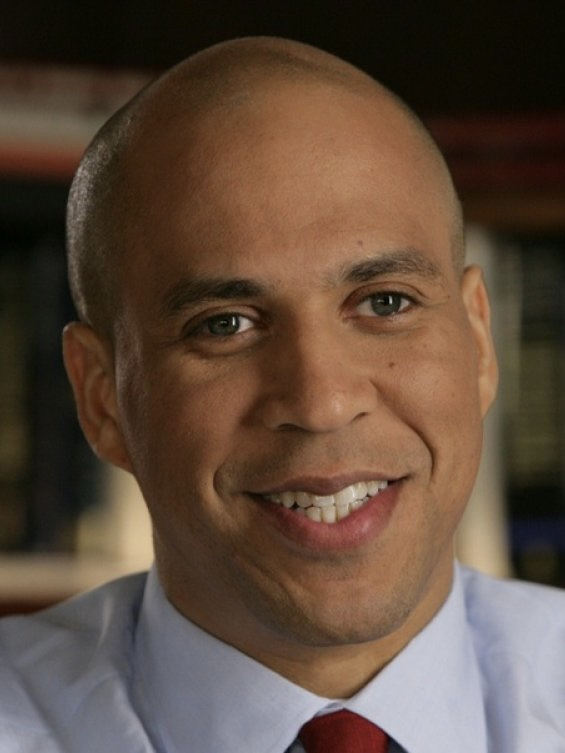

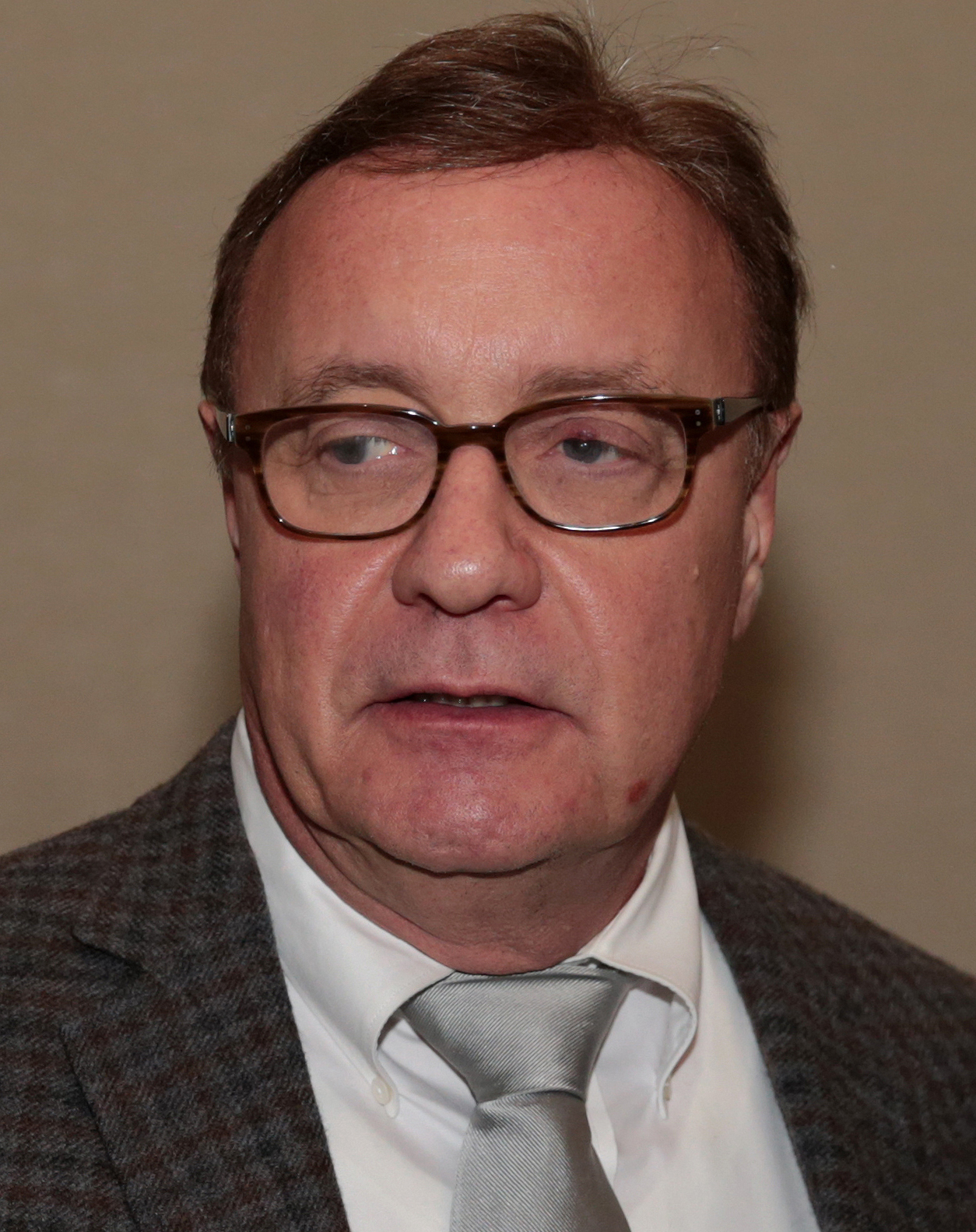
Nominee	Cory Booker	Steve Lonegan
Party	Democratic	Republican
Popular vote	740,742	593,684
Percentage	54.9%	44.0%
- Booker: 40–50% 50–60% 60–70% 70–80% 80–90% >90% Lonegan: 40–50% 50–60% 60–70% 70–80% 80–90%
U.S. senator before election
Jeffrey Chiesa
Republican
Elected U.S. Senator
Cory Booker
Democratic

The 2013 United States Senate special election in New Jersey was held on October 16, 2013, to fill the New Jersey United States Senate Class 2 seat for the remainder of the term ending January 3, 2015. The vacancy resulted from the death of five-term Democratic senator Frank Lautenberg on June 3, 2013. On June 4, 2013, New Jersey Governor Chris Christie announced that a primary election to fill the vacancy would take place on August 13, 2013 and that a special election would follow on October 16, 2013. Christie appointed Republican New Jersey Attorney General Jeffrey Chiesa to the seat as a placeholder; Chiesa announced at the time of his appointment that he would not be a candidate in the special election.

The primary elections were won by Republican former Bogota Mayor Steve Lonegan and Democratic Newark Mayor Cory Booker. Booker defeated Lonegan on October 16, 2013, and became the first African-American elected to statewide office in New Jersey. 24.5% of registered voters cast ballots, making this the lowest voter turnout of any statewide election.
