= 2013 Buffalo mayoral election =

- November 5, 2013
- Turnout: 14%
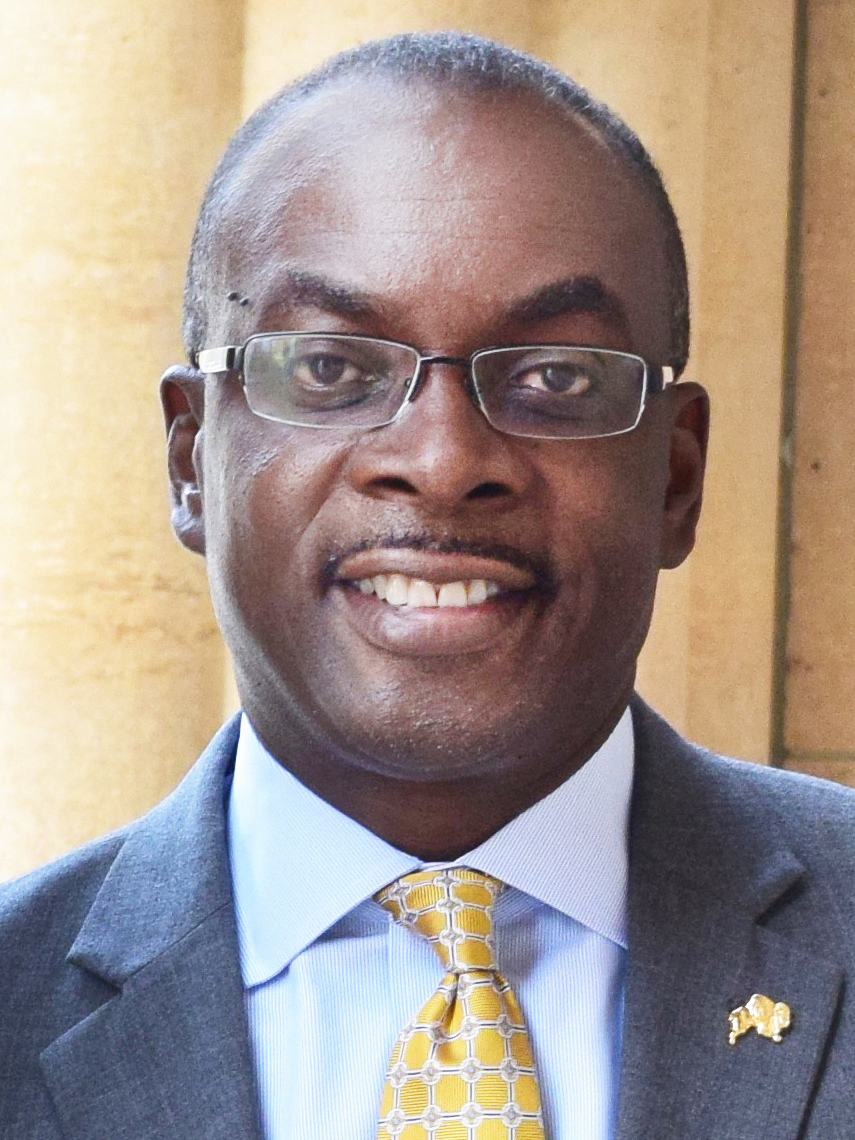

Nominee	Byron Brown	Sergio Rodriguez
Party	Democratic	Republican
Alliance	Working Families; Conservative; Independence	Progressive
Popular vote	26,120	10,733
Percentage	70.88%	29.12%
- Results by city council district Brown: 50–60% 60–70% 70–80% 80–90% >90%
Mayor before election
Byron Brown
Elected mayor
Byron Brown

The 2013 election for Mayor of Buffalo, New York took place on November 5, 2013. Two-term incumbent Democrat Byron Brown won reelection, defeating Republican Sergio Rodriguez.

== Background ==
The 2013 Buffalo mayoral race is notable as the first mayoral election in Buffalo's history to not feature any white, non-Hispanic candidates in either the primary or the general elections. A Buffalo News editorial noted that despite the historic racial aspect of the election, Buffalo voters that year tended to be more concerned with traditional issues such as crime and education, in sharp contrast to the deep ethnic divisions that have normally characterized city politics.

=== Candidates ===
==== Democratic Party ====
Brown was challenged in the Democratic primary by Bernard Tolbert, the former Special Agent-in-Charge of Buffalo's FBI field office, the former vice-president of Security for the National Basketball Association, and a former executive with the Coca-Cola Company.

==== Republican Party ====
Rodriguez, a 32-year-old, Dominican-born Marine Corps veteran, small business owner, and Medaille College administrator, ran unopposed as Buffalo's first Republican mayoral candidate since 2005.

==== Other potential candidates ====
Early in 2013, City Comptroller Mark Schroeder was rumored to be considering a campaign for mayor. However, he declined to run and later endorsed Brown.

Local businessman Matthew Ricchiazzi was reported in June 2013 to be circulating petitions for a possible mayoral campaign. If a Ricchiazzi campaign had actually materialized, it would have touched off a rare Republican primary between him and Rodriguez.

== Debates ==
Leading up to the primary elections on September 10, Brown, Tolbert and Rodriguez participated in three televised debates.

The first mayoral debate took place on August 14, 2013, at the Buffalo News auditorium, sponsored by the Buffalo Association of Black Journalists and moderated by Al Vaughters of WIVB-TV. The dominant issue at the first debate was crime, with Rodriguez disputing Brown's assertion that crime had decreased in the city since the previous election; Brown rebutted by calling Rodriguez's statistics "absolutely false" and "nonsense". In addition, both Tolbert and Rodriguez claimed that Buffalo's police department was understaffed and inefficient, with Brown disputing Tolbert's specific claims that there had been a net loss in officers employed by the Buffalo Police since Brown's mayoral tenure began. Other issues that were debated included unemployment, with Brown forced to defend his administration in the face of statistics cited by Rodriguez showing that the unemployment rate in Buffalo had risen from 6.3% to 10% during Brown's two terms as mayor, and low graduation rates in the Buffalo Public Schools, with Tolbert calling for more involvement by the mayor's office in the school system and Rodriguez going even further, favoring complete mayoral control of the school board as in New York City and Yonkers, while Brown reaffirmed his commitment to cooperation with the Board of Education but denied he had the authority to directly participate in school-district policymaking.

The second debate was held on August 22, 2013, at St. Mary's School for the Deaf, sponsored by the Parkside Community Association and moderated by Buffalo News reporter Brian Meyer, with questions fielded directly from the audience. The beleaguered state of the Buffalo Public Schools was the dominant topic in the second debate, with Tolbert elaborating on his earlier position regarding mayoral involvement in the school board by proposing that three of the nine school board members, as well as the school superintendent, be appointed directly by the mayor, while Rodriguez repeated his earlier call for direct mayoral control of the schools. Brown, for his part, touted his success in restoring music programs to Buffalo city schools as well as the hiring of more school security officers. In addition, the Brown administration's record on economic development was attacked by both challengers, with Brown's boasts of $1.7 billion in development projects currently underway in the city countered by Tolbert's criticism that Brown allowed the Buffalo Economic Renaissance Corporation to fold under his watch, as well as his characterization of economic development in Buffalo as concentrated in downtown at the expense of the neighborhoods. As well, Rodriguez cited statistics showing that Buffalo's employment base had been reduced by 10,000 people since Brown took office in 2006.

The third and final mayoral debate was held on August 27, 2013, at WNED-TV studios. The candidates reiterated the points covered in the first two debates on police department staffing issues, unemployment, economic development, and problems in the Buffalo Public Schools. On the subject of crime, both Rodriguez and Tolbert derided Brown's use of gun buyback programs as a remedy for crime, with Tolbert characterizing the buybacks as "stunts". Also in the third debate, Tolbert was put on the defensive when he was asked about a sexual harassment lawsuit that had been filed against him while he was an executive at the National Basketball Association, while Brown was compelled to deny reports that his administration was rewarding campaign donors with patronage jobs as a quid pro quo and described a lawsuit filed against the city by a housing development company alleging a pay-to-play policy for awarding contracts as "baseless" and "absolute nonsense".

== Democratic primary ==
=== Campaigning ===
Though praised for his experience in crimefighting and community service and his "straight-shooting vibe", Tolbert was criticized for waiting until relatively late in the election to announce his candidacy, spending many months courting potential backers and conspicuously attending community events as speculation grew, but not establishing a campaign finance committee until April 2 nor officially entering the race until May 11.

In the run-up to the primary, a Siena College poll commissioned by the Buffalo News and WGRZ-TV and conducted between August 11 and 13, 2013 favored Brown to win the Democratic primary election against Tolbert by a margin of 61–32. According to a Buffalo News editorial published on August 17, though his fundraising prowess, his name recognition and the other benefits of incumbency, and the great progress in waterfront development that took place during his administration would have made any primary challenge difficult, Brown's especially formidable lead was described as first and foremost a product of the shortcomings of his opponent's campaign, an anemic one by a political novice whose muddled message failed to resonate with voters, and particularly with the African-American community whose loyalty to Brown Tolbert had hoped to challenge. For his part, Tolbert accused Brown of pressuring city workers to donate to his campaign as a condition of continued employment as well as engaging in intimidation tactics against volunteers on opposing campaigns, the latter of which was echoed by Rodriguez.

Despite an impressive performance by Tolbert in the three mayoral debates that frequently put Brown on the defensive, a subsequent Siena College poll taken three weeks after the aforementioned one showed that Brown had widened his lead over Tolbert by four points.

=== Election returns ===
The Democratic primary election was held on September 10, 2013. Brown won the election, earning 14,022 votes (68.1%) to Tolbert's 6,577 (31.9%).

Commenting on Brown's official nomination the day after the election, a Buffalo News editorial reiterated the points made in the August 17 editorial regarding Brown's name recognition and the capital investments on the waterfront, also opining that the incumbent benefited from an electorate that largely believed Buffalo is heading in the right direction despite the problems facing the city school system, on which Tolbert tried and failed to capitalize. The editorial also mentioned the ample airtime on local television the Brown campaign purchased with its massive "fundraising war chest" for its commercial, which prominently featured President Barack Obama's praise of the sitting mayor during a visit to the University at Buffalo on August 22, 2013.

Contrary to predictions, turnout in the primary was historically low, with roughly 20% of registered Democrats voting. This apathy was attributed variously to Brown's perceived invincibility given his overwhelming lead in the polls, or to a failure by both Brown and Tolbert to inspire enthusiasm among city voters.

Democratic primary results
Party	Candidate	Votes	%
Democratic	Byron W. Brown (incumbent)	15,487	68.54%
Democratic	Bernard Tolbert	7,110	31.46%
Total votes		22,597	100%

== Conservative primary ==
=== Campaigning ===
In July 2013, under the terms of New York State's electoral fusion law, Rodriguez announced plans to mount a write-in candidacy as a Conservative to challenge that party's official endorsement of Brown, much as 2005 Republican candidate Kevin Helfer did, and also to circulate petitions for a possible independent run. Rodriguez was indeed able to collect the required number of valid signatures to run as a Conservative, but the Erie County Conservative Party, who had earlier endorsed Brown, vigorously sought to fend off Rodriguez's challenge by distributing a mailer to Conservative-registered city voters assailing Rodriguez for his support of the NY SAFE Act and his past unpaid student loans, a move Rodriguez described as "ugly, dirty, slanderous and baseless politics that people have grown to detest" employed in order "to deny voters a choice". The party also legally challenged all of the petitions collected by Rodriguez based on a little-known stipulation that the notaries public who distribute Opportunity To Ballot petitions must swear in the signers; this effort was dismissed by Erie County Supreme Court Justice John Michalek, setting the stage for a Conservative primary.

=== Election returns ===
The Conservative primary was held on September 10, 2013. Brown captured 70 of the votes cast, while Rodriguez captured 44 and Tolbert 11.

Conservative primary results
Party	Candidate	Votes	%
Conservative	Byron W. Brown (incumbent)	70	56.00%
Conservative	Sergio Rodriguez (write-in)	44	35.20%
Conservative	Bernard Tolbert (write-in)	11	8.80%
Total votes		125	100%

== Republican campaign ==
Rodriguez officially announced his candidacy on February 6, 2013. His robust campaign featured an active social media presence and an emphasis on grassroots campaigning as exemplified by his "30 Day Every Neighborhood Tour" in September and October, which saw the candidate go door-to-door interacting with and fielding questions from residents of all parts of the city. Nonetheless, it was remarked in the Buffalo News that although Rodriguez had generated some buzz among Buffalo Hispanics, he had as yet failed to unite the city's Latino community in support of his long-shot candidacy.

In addition to his pursuit of the Conservative line, Rodriguez's petitions for an independent run also bore fruit with his announcement on September 25 that he would be running on a new ballot line, dubbed the Progressive Party. The party's name and platform make direct reference to the Progressive or "Bull Moose" Party founded by Theodore Roosevelt in 1912, with a stated goal of reforming city government by transcending partisan divisions and "making governmental changes parallel with the changing needs of its people... with a dignity defined by moral strength and urgency".

== Endorsements ==
Brown received the endorsement of the Erie County Democratic Committee, and also of the Erie County Conservative, Working Families, and Independence parties. He was also endorsed by, among others, New York Governor Andrew Cuomo, U.S. Senator Charles Schumer, U.S. Congressman Brian Higgins, New York State Senator Tim Kennedy, Erie County Executive Mark Poloncarz, New York State Comptroller Thomas DiNapoli, New York State Assemblypeople Crystal Peoples-Stokes, Sean Ryan, and Michael Kearns (the latter of whom had been his primary challenger in the previous election), the Buffalo Niagara Partnership, and the Buffalo Niagara Association of Realtors.

Tolbert, whose criticism of Brown in the months leading up to the Democratic primary largely centered on the incumbent mayor's crime-fighting efforts, received the endorsement of the Buffalo Police Benevolent Association in July 2013. Tolbert also received the endorsement of Challenger Community News, one of Buffalo's two African-American community newspapers.

Rodriguez received the endorsement of the City of Buffalo Republican Committee. However, the Erie County Republican Party declined to endorse Rodriguez, amid accusations from Rodriguez's camp that county Republican officials pressured him to drop out of the race for fear that increased voter turnout in heavily Democratic Buffalo could be a detriment to Republican candidates for countywide office. Rodriguez also received the endorsement of "The Griffin", the Canisius College student paper.

== General Election Results ==
General election results
Party	Candidate	Votes	%
Democratic	Byron W. Brown (incumbent)	23,881	64.80%
Working Families	Byron W. Brown (incumbent)	978	2.65%
Conservative	Byron W. Brown (incumbent)	665	1.80%
Independence	Byron W. Brown (incumbent)	596	1.62%
Total	Byron W. Brown (incumbent)	26,120	70.88%
Republican	Sergio Rodriguez	9,390	25.48%
Progressive	Sergio Rodriguez	1,343	3.64%
Total	Sergio Rodriguez	10,733	29.12%
Total votes		36,853	100%
