= 2013 San Antonio mayoral election =

- May 11, 2013
- Turnout: 6.94% ▼
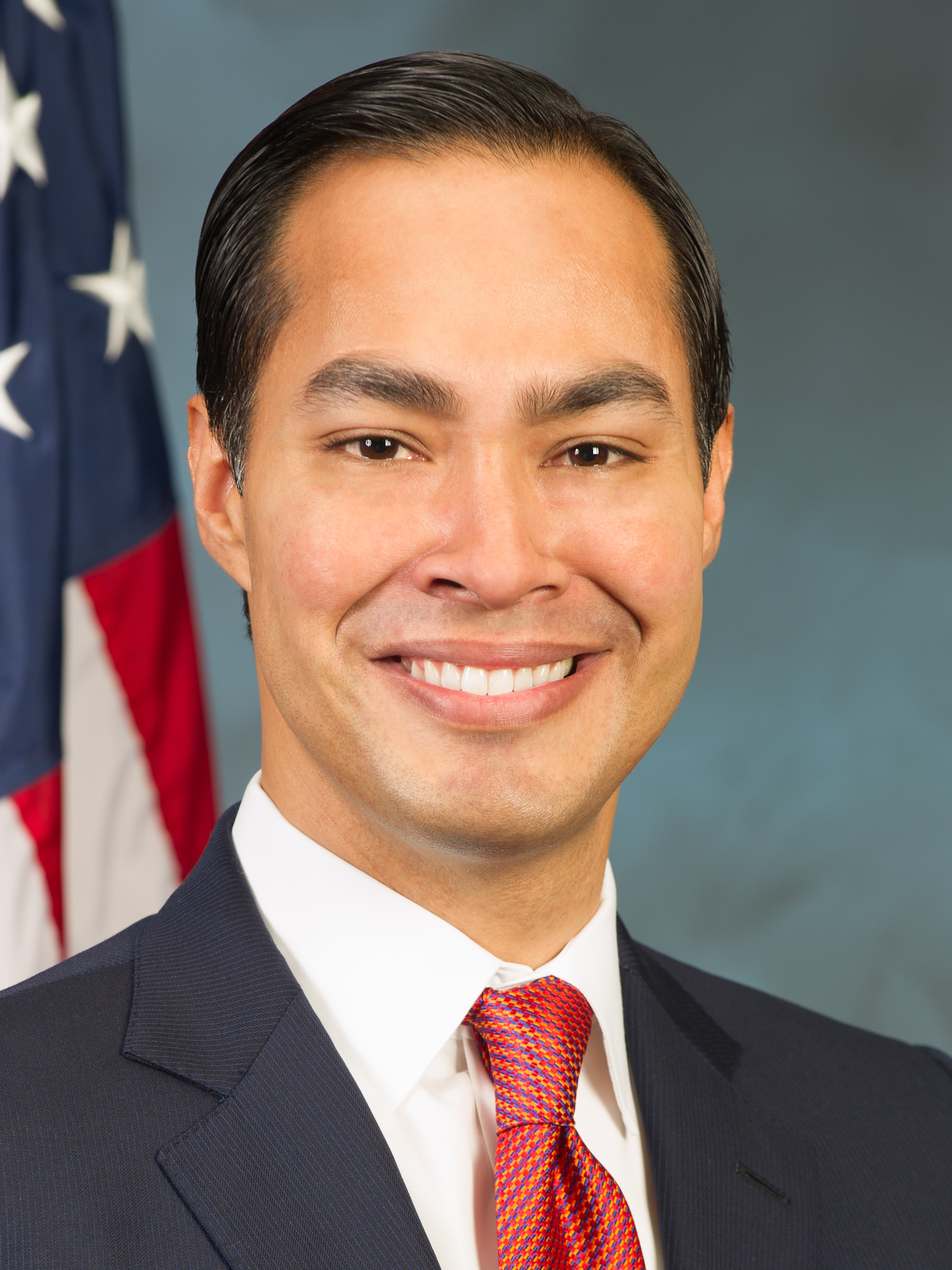

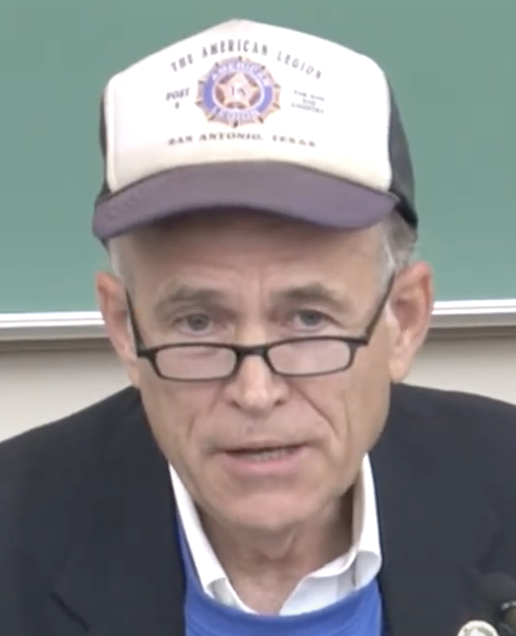

Candidate	Julian Castro	Rhett R. Smith	Jesus G. Reyes
Popular vote	29,454	5,807	2,934
Percentage	66.51%	13.11%	6.63%
Candidate	Michael Idrogo
Popular vote	2,298
Percentage	5.19%
Mayor before election
Julian Castro
Elected mayor
Julian Castro

On May 11, 2013, the city of San Antonio, Texas, held a mayoral election for the role of Mayor of San Antonio to serve a two-year term to expire in 2015. Julian Castro, the incumbent Mayor, was re-elected as mayor of San Antonio with a substantial majority, avoiding a runoff and earning a third term. Under Texas law, all municipal elections are officially nonpartisan.

== Background ==
Julian Castro, who was first elected mayor in the 2009 mayoral election, was re-elected in 2011 with an overwhelming majority, facing limited opposition and chose to seek re-election to a third term in this election.

== Candidates ==
After the deadline to file passed, pundits noted that Julian Castro would likely secure re-election as no major challengers had opted to run for the second consecutive time, and the six challengers that did file did not make significant efforts to campaign.

=== Declared ===
- Julian Castro, then-incumbent Mayor of San Antonio.
- Sergio Falcon
- Michael "Commander" Idrogo
- Jesus G. Reyes
- Irma Rosas
- Rhett R. Smith
- Raymond Zavala

== Results ==
On May 11, 2013, the election for Mayor was held. Julian Castro secured re-election with over 66% of the vote, thus negating the need of a runoff election.

San Antonio Mayor, 2013 Regular election, May 11, 2013
Candidate		Votes	%	±
✓	Julian Castro	29,454	66.51%	-14.93%
	Rhett R. Smith	5,807	13.11%	+8.00%
	Jesus G. Reyes	2,934	6.63%	
	Michael "Commander" Idrogo	2,298	5.19%	+2.47%
	Raymond Zavala	1,472	3.32%	
	Irma Rosas	1,461	3.30%	
	Sergio Falcon	857	1.94%	
Turnout		44.823	5.79%*	

* Vote percentage include all of Bexar County with a total of 8,764 either voting in another municipal election, casting a spoiled vote or casting no ballot for San Antonio mayor.

== Later Events ==
Despite being elected to a third term as Mayor, Julian Castro would ultimately not serve the full term, as he was nominated and confirmed by the United States Senate to become the United States Secretary of Housing and Urban Development, a role he would serve until the end of the Obama administration on January 20, 2017. The vacancy in the mayoralty was filled by an internal election of the City Council, leading to Ivy Taylor being selected to serve the balance of the term until the 2015 mayoral election.
