= 2013 United States Senate elections =

← 2012	June 25, 2013 – October 16, 2013	2014 →

2 of the 100 seats in the United States Senate 51 seats needed for a majority
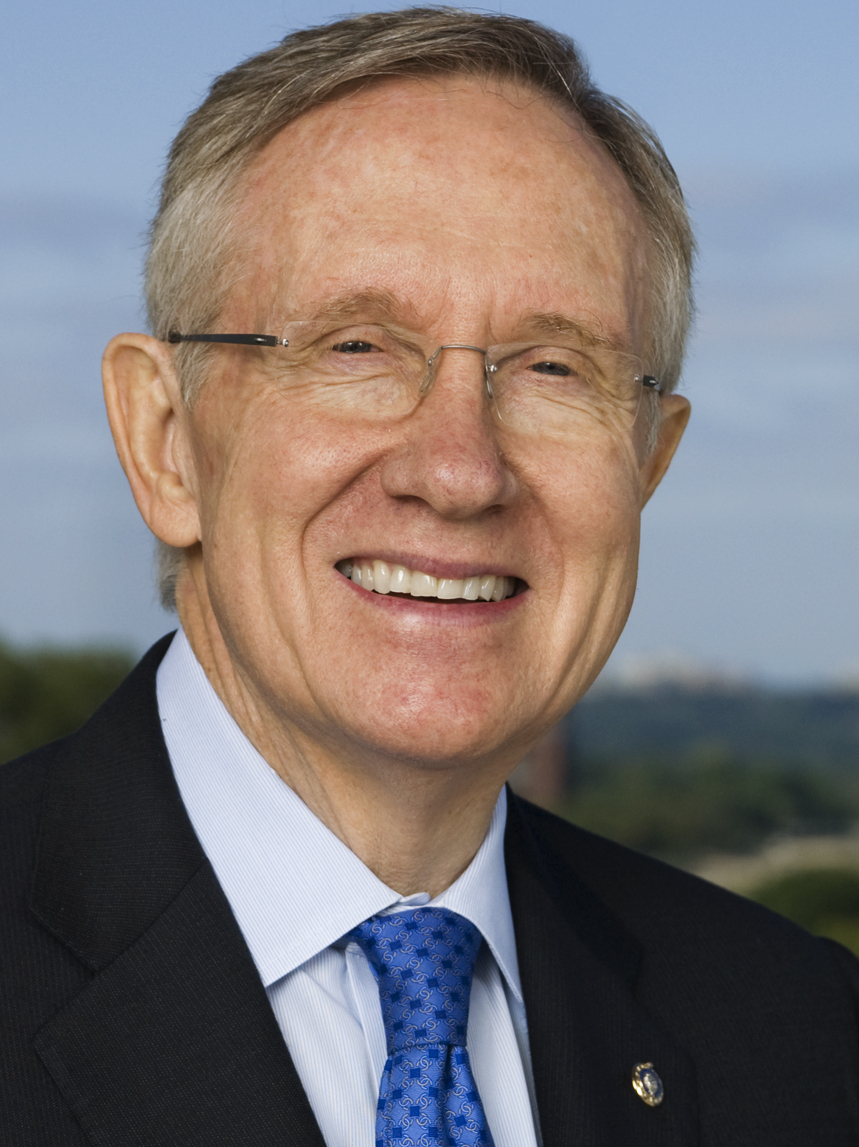

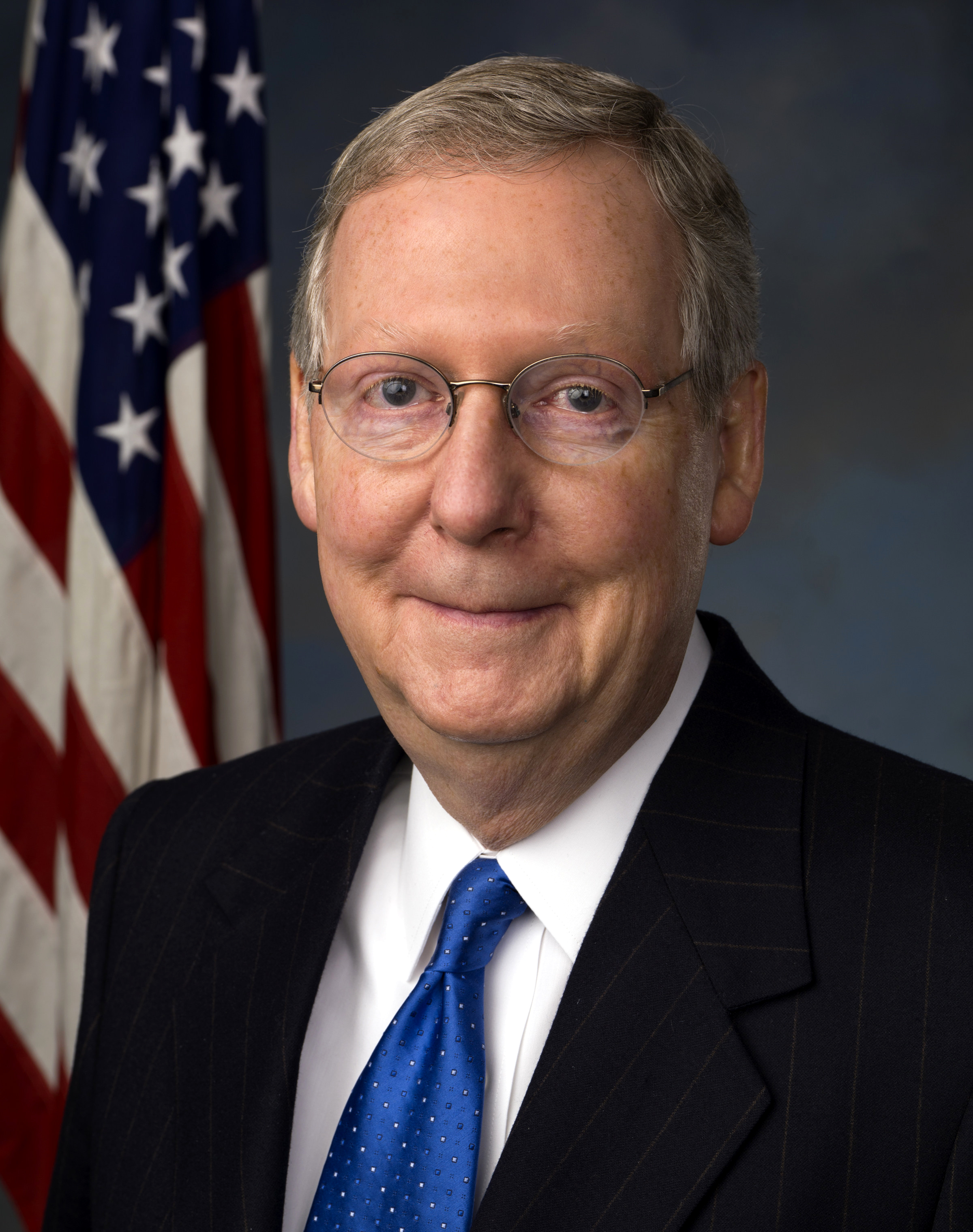
	Majority party	Minority party
Leader	Harry Reid	Mitch McConnell
Party	Democratic	Republican
Leader's seat	Nevada	Kentucky
Seats before	52	46
Seats after	53	45
Seat change	▲1	▼1
Popular vote	1,383,730	1,118,764
Percentage	54.7%	44.2%
Seats up	1	1
Races won	2	0
	Third party
Party	Independent
Seats before	2
Seats after	2
Seat change	Steady
Popular vote	14,233
Percentage	0.5%
Seats up	0
Races won	0
- Results of the elections: Democratic gain Democratic hold No election
Majority Leader before election
Harry Reid
Democratic
Majority Leader after election
Harry Reid
Democratic

There were two special elections to the United States Senate in 2013; ordered by election date:

== Race summary ==
State (linked to summaries below)	Incumbent			Results	Candidates
State (linked to summaries below)	Senator	Party	Electoral history	Results	Candidates
Massachusetts (Class 2)	Mo Cowan	Democratic	2013 (Appointed)	Interim appointee retired. New senator elected June 25, 2013. Democratic hold.	▌ ✓ Ed Markey (Democratic) 54.8%; ▌Gabriel E. Gomez (Republican) 44.8%
New Jersey (Class 2)	Jeffrey Chiesa	Republican	2013 (Appointed)	Interim appointee retired. New senator elected October 16, 2013. Democratic gain.	▌ ✓ Cory Booker (Democratic) 54.9%; ▌Steve Lonegan (Republican) 44.0%

== Massachusetts (special) ==
2013 United States Senate special election in Massachusetts
← 2008	June 25, 2013	2014 →
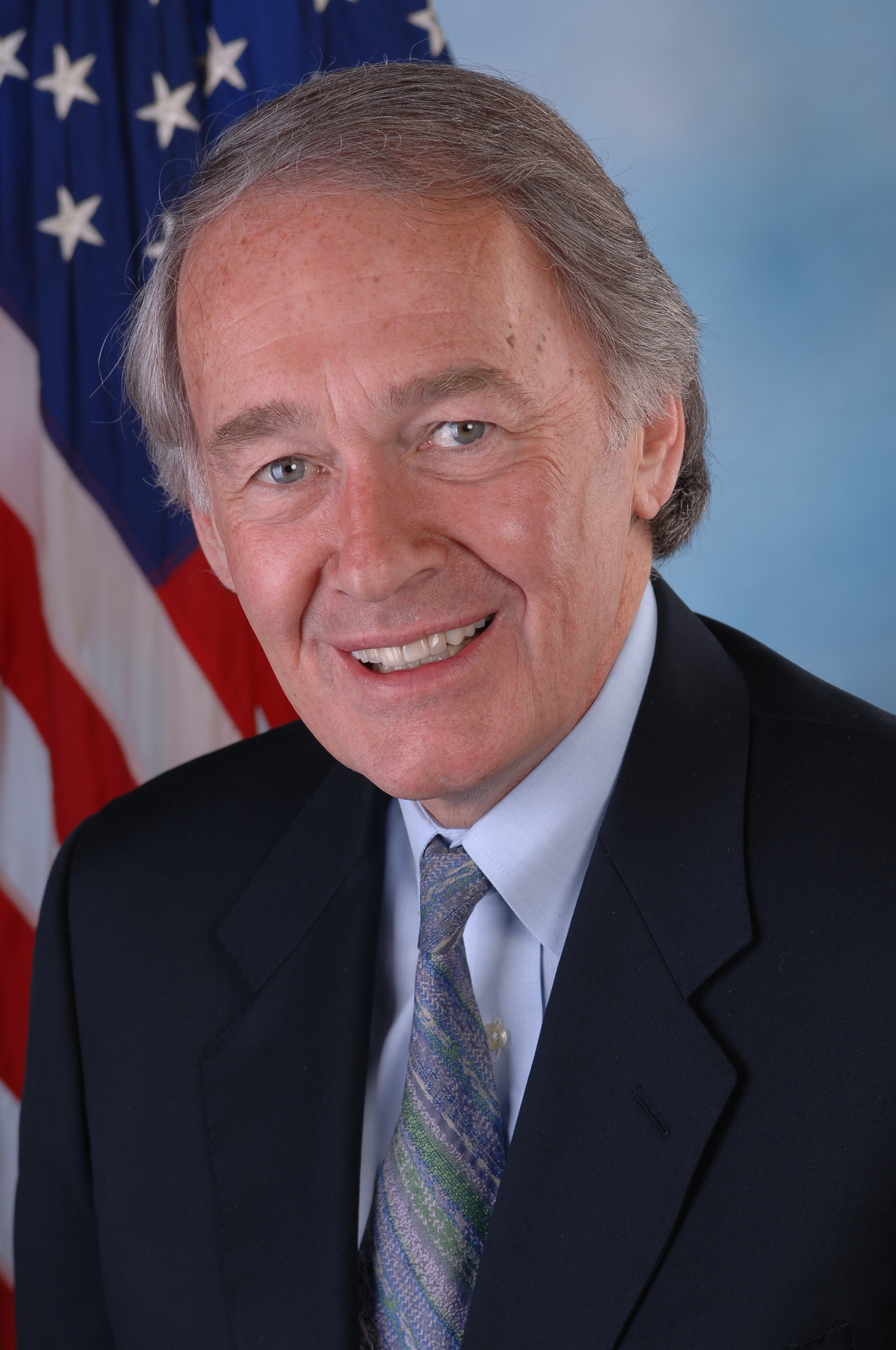

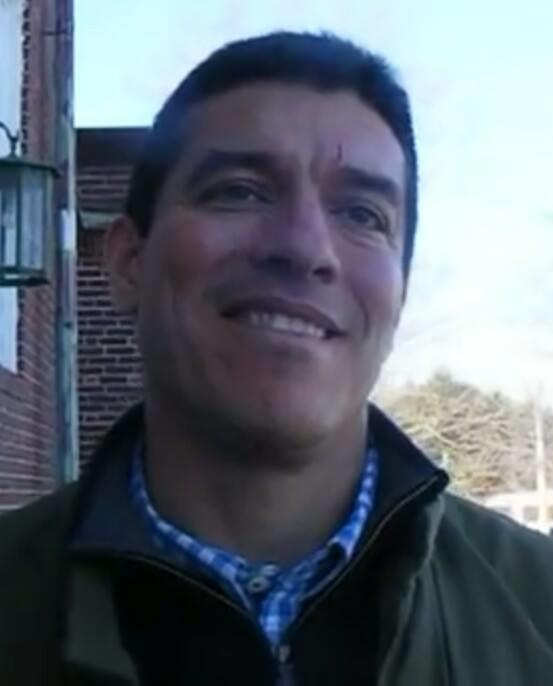
Nominee	Ed Markey	Gabriel E. Gomez
Party	Democratic	Republican
Popular vote	645,429	525,307
Percentage	54.7%	44.5%
- Markey: 40–50% 50–60% 60–70% 70–80% 80–90% Gomez: 40–50% 50–60% 60–70% 70–80%
U.S. senator before election
Mo Cowan
Democratic
Elected U.S. Senator
Ed Markey
Democratic

A special election was held June 25, 2013 to fill the Class 2 seat for the remainder of the term ending January 3, 2015.

The vacancy that prompted the special election was created by the resignation of Senator John Kerry, in order to become U.S. Secretary of State. On January 30, 2013, Governor Deval Patrick chose his former Chief of Staff Mo Cowan to serve as interim U.S. Senator. Cowan declined to participate in the election. A party primary election was held April 30 to determinate the nominees of each party for the general election. The Massachusetts Democrats nominated congressman Ed Markey, while the Massachusetts Republicans nominated Gabriel E. Gomez, a businessman and former Navy SEAL.

The special primary elections took place on April 30. Democratic Congressman Ed Markey and Republican businessman Gabriel E. Gomez won their respective primaries.

Massachusetts Democratic special primary
Party	Candidate	Votes	%
Democratic	Ed Markey	311,219	57.0
Democratic	Stephen Lynch	230,335	43.0

Massachusetts Republican special primary
Party	Candidate	Votes	%
Republican	Gabriel Gomez	96,276	51.0
Republican	Michael J. Sullivan	67,918	36.0
Republican	Daniel Winslow	24,630	13.0

Massachusetts special election
Party	Candidate	Votes	%	±%
Democratic	Edward Markey	642,988	54.71%	▼11.11
Republican	Gabriel Gomez	525,080	44.53%	▲13.54
Twelve Visions Party	Richard Heos	4,518	0.39%	n/a
	Write-ins and Blank	4,495	0.38%	n/a
Majority		120,122	10.18%	
Turnout		1,179,781		
Democratic hold		Swing	▼11.1	

== New Jersey (special) ==
2013 United States Senate special election in New Jersey
← 2008	October 16, 2013	2014 →
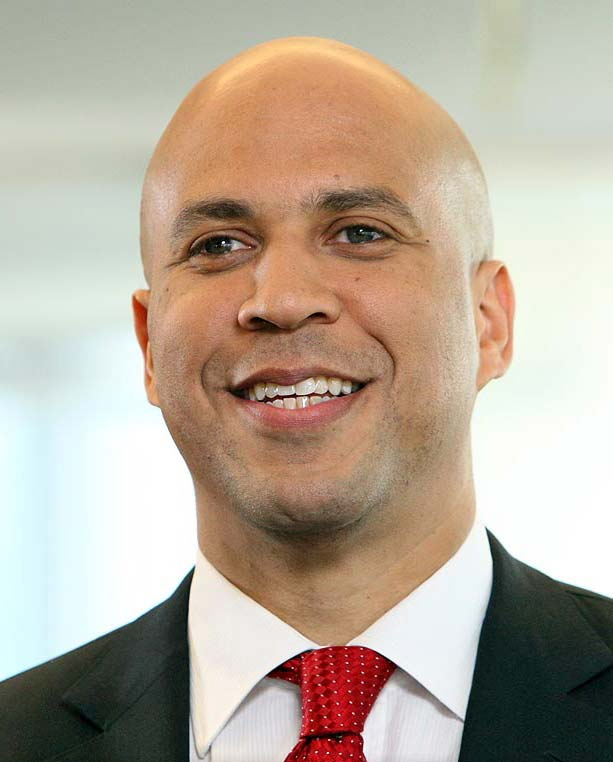

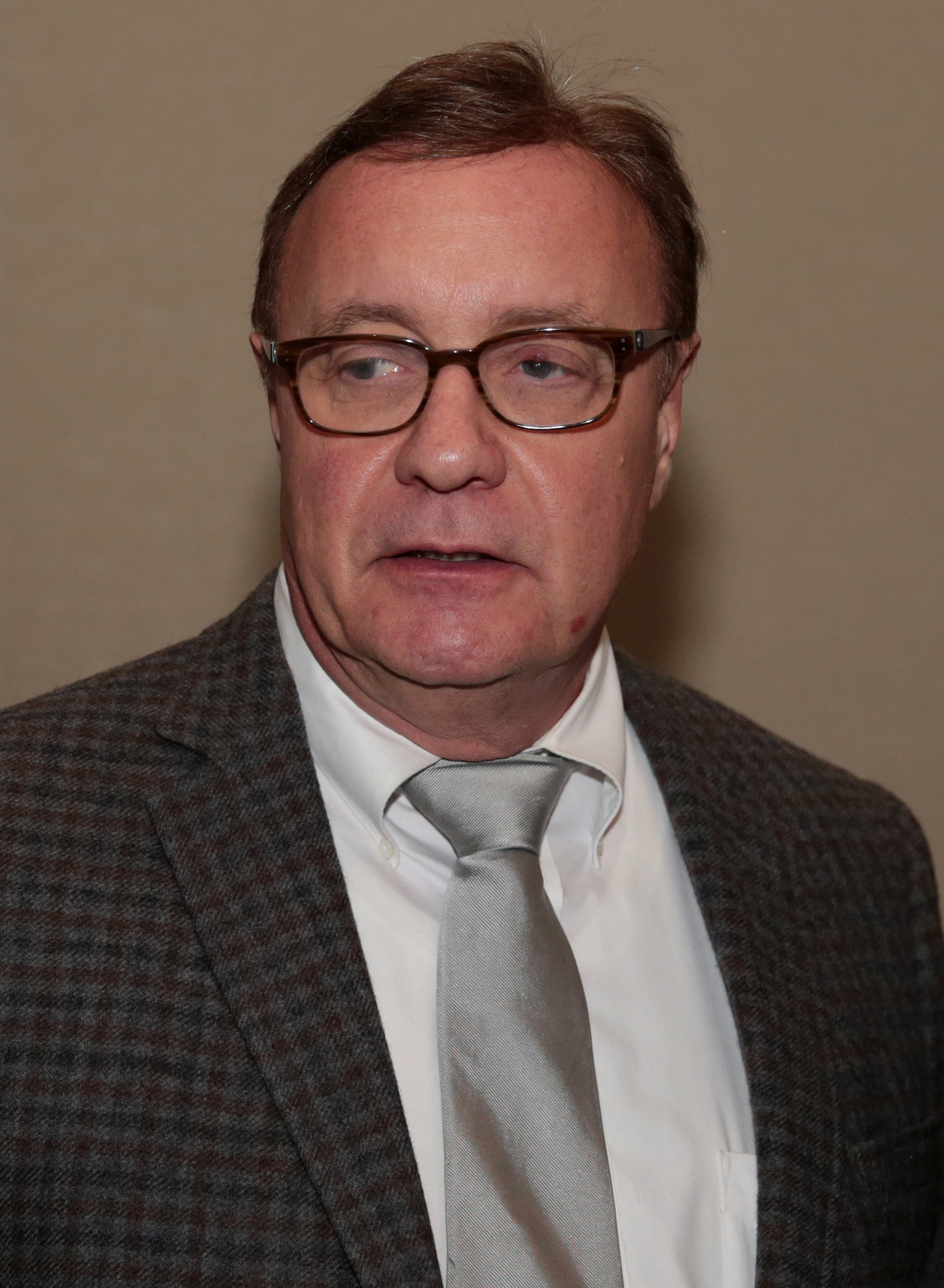
Nominee	Cory Booker	Steve Lonegan
Party	Democratic	Republican
Popular vote	740,742	593,684
Percentage	54.9%	44.0%
- Booker: 40–50% 50–60% 60–70% 70–80% 80–90% 90–100% Lonegan: 40–50% 50–60% 60–70% 70–80% 80–90% Tie: 40–50%
U.S. senator before election
Jeffrey Chiesa
Republican
Elected U.S. Senator
Cory Booker
Democratic

A special election was held October 16, 2013 to fill the Class 2 seat for the remainder of the term ending January 3, 2015. The vacancy resulted from the death of five-term Democrat Frank Lautenberg on June 3, 2013. In the interim, the seat was held by Republican Senator Jeffrey Chiesa, who was appointed on June 6, 2013 by New Jersey Governor Chris Christie to serve until the elected winner was sworn in. At the time of his appointment, Chiesa, then New Jersey's Attorney General, announced that he would not be a candidate in the special election.

Following Lautenberg's death, there was a great deal of speculation and controversy over when a special election would or could be scheduled, but the following day, June 4, 2013, Christie announced that the primary would take place on August 13, 2013, and the special election on October 16, 2013. Christie was criticized for scheduling a separate election for Senate when a gubernatorial election was already taking place in November. In the primary elections, the Republicans nominated former Bogota Mayor Steve Lonegan and the Democrats nominated Newark Mayor Cory Booker. Booker led in every opinion poll and the race was called for him at approximately 9:45 pm EDT on October 16, 2013. Booker resigned as Mayor of Newark and was sworn in on October 31, 2013 to become the junior U.S. senator from New Jersey.

The special primary elections took place on August 13. Former Republican Mayor of Bogota Steve Lonegan and Democratic Mayor of Newark Cory Booker won their respective primaries. They faced off against six Independent/Third Party candidates in the October 16, 2013 general election.

New Jersey special Republican primary election
Party	Candidate	Votes	%
Republican	Steve Lonegan	103,280	80.09%
Republican	Alieta Eck	25,669	19.91%
Total votes		128,958	100.00%

New Jersey special Democratic primary election
Party	Candidate	Votes	%
Democratic	Cory Booker	216,936	59.17%
Democratic	Frank Pallone	72,584	19.80%
Democratic	Rush D. Holt Jr.	61,463	16.76%
Democratic	Sheila Oliver	15,656	4.27%
Total votes		366,639	100.00%

New Jersey special election
Party	Candidate	Votes	%	±%
Democratic	Cory Booker	740,742	54.92%	−1.11%
Republican	Steve Lonegan	593,684	44.02%	+2.07%
Independent	Edward C. Stackhouse, Jr.	5,138	0.38%	N/A
Independent	Robert Depasquale	3,137	0.23%	N/A
Independent	Stuart David Meissner	2,051	0.15%	N/A
Independent	Pablo Olivera	1,530	0.11%	N/A
Independent	Antonio Nico Sabas	1,336	0.10%	N/A
Independent	Eugene M. LaVergne	1,041	0.08%	N/A
Total votes		'1,348,659'	'100.0%'	N/A
Democratic gain from Republican				
