= 2013 Miami mayoral election =

- November 5, 2013

Candidate	Tomás Regalado	Jeff Benjamin	Williams Armbrister
Popular vote	20,414	2,543	2,096
Percentage	78.01%	9.72%	8.01%
Mayor before election
Tomás Regalado
Republican
Elected Mayor
Tomás Regalado
Republican

The 2013 Miami mayoral election took place on November 5, 2013. Incumbent Mayor Tomás Regalado ran for re-election to a second term. Though he was originally challenged by City Commissioner Francis Suarez, the son of former Mayor Xavier Suarez, Suarez dropped out of the race on August 26, 2013, blaming staffers for "mistakes we made" during the campaign.

With Suarez out of the race, Regalado did not face a well-known opponent, and diverted most of his campaign funds toward supporting ballot measures that he supported. Regalado ultimately won re-election in a landslide, receiving 78 percent of the vote.

== General election ==
=== Candidates ===
- Tomás Regalado, incumbent Mayor
- Jeff Benjamin, hospital consultant
- Williams Armbrister, activist
- Tom Baumann, Socialist Workers Part activist

==== Withdrew ====
- Francis Suarez, City Commissioner

=== Results ===
2013 Miami mayoral election results
Party	Candidate	Votes	%
Nonpartisan	Tomás Regalado (incumbent)	20,414	78.01
Nonpartisan	Jeff Benjamin	2,543	9.72
Nonpartisan	Williams Armbrister	2,096	8.01
Nonpartisan	Tom Baumann	1,116	4.26
Total votes		26,169	100
