= 2013 Atlantic City mayoral election =

Mayoral election in the United States

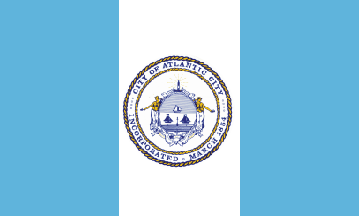
- November 5, 2013
Nominee	Don Guardian	Lorenzo Langford
Party	Republican	Democratic
Popular vote	3,932	3,568
Percentage	50.86%	46.15%

The 2013 Atlantic City mayoral election was held in Atlantic City, New Jersey on November 5, 2013, to elect a mayor for the city of Atlantic City. Incumbent mayor Lorenzo Langford was seeking reelection to a second term. Langford was defeated by Republican Don Guardian, the resort town's first openly gay mayor.

== Background ==
Lorenzo Langford had been the mayor of Atlantic City in two different time periods, from January 1, 2002, to January 1, 2006, and again from January 1, 2008, to the time of the election. He was running for a fourth term which was marred by controversy regarding the 2009 election and a subsequent investigation into the city Democratic Party leaders, and Langford's mismanagement following Superstorm Sandy.
